= 2006 Mississauga municipal election =

2006 Mississauga mayoral election
← 2003	November 13, 2006	2010 →
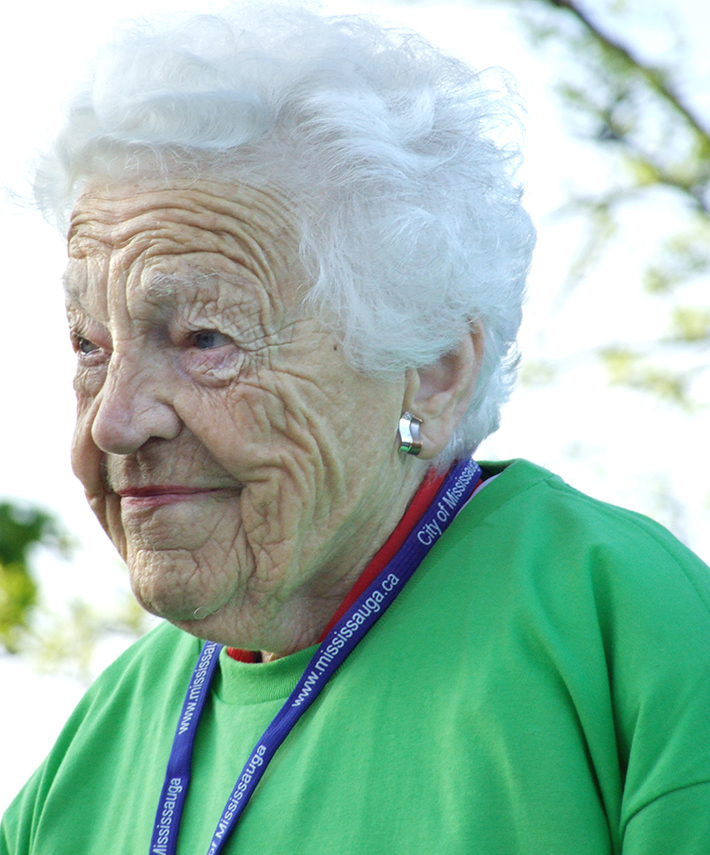
		DB
Candidate	Hazel McCallion	Donald Barber
Popular vote	98,293	5,571
Percentage	91.41%	5.18%
Mayor before election
Hazel McCallion
Elected mayor
Hazel McCallion

The 2006 Mississauga municipal elections took place on November 13, 2006, to elect a mayor and 11 city councillors in Mississauga, Ontario, Canada. The 2006 election was noteworthy for its record number of candidates, in part due to two new wards being added to Council. Details about the candidates in the 2006 election and past elections in Mississauga are listed as an external link below. In addition, school trustees were elected to the Peel District School Board, Dufferin-Peel Catholic District School Board, Conseil scolaire de district du Centre-Sud-Ouest and Conseil scolaire de district catholique Centre-Sud. These elections were held in conjunction with those held in all other municipalities across the province of Ontario (see 2006 Ontario municipal elections).

== Mayoral race ==
Candidate	Vote	%
Hazel McCallion (X)	98,293	91.41%
Donald Barber	5,571	5.18%
Roy N. Willis	3,667	3.41%

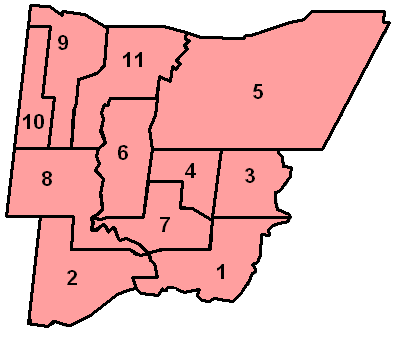
Map of Mississauga's Wards

== City council ==
Candidate	Vote	%
Ward 1
Carmen Corbasson (X)	6179	79.24%
Gordon Clarkson	514	6.59%
Bill Lediard	408	5.23%
Susan Ranchod	359	4.60%
Michael Daroczi	170	2.18%
Scott Kletke	113	1.45%
Erik Sonstenes	55	0.71%
Ward 2
Patricia Mullin (X)	6401	78.22%
Brian J. Hurley	1515	18.51%
Grant Ouellette	267	3.26%
Ward 3
Maja Prentice (X)	5848	58.08%
Peter Ferreira	3538	35.14%
John Busic	265	2.63%
Sarfraz Mahmood	224	2.22%
Jason Roti	194	1.93%
Ward 4
Frank Dale (X)	8396	80.94%
Jerry Mitrut	917	8.84%
Khalid Mehmood	367	3.54%
Sathish Balasunderam	349	3.36%
Marina Khan Ghazvani	344	3.32%
Ward 5
Eve Adams (X)	5704	45.77%
Karman Singh Punian	2352	18.87%
Sydney Weir	1369	10.99%
Ricardo C. Francis	861	6.91%
Frank Perrotta	528	4.24%
Rana Ahmad	490	3.93%
Sam Hanna	442	3.55%
Brad MacDonald	441	3.54%
Stephen Largy	203	1.63%
Said M. Aldajani	71	0.57%
Ward 6
Carolyn Parrish	6339	48.54%
Ron Starr	4852	37.15%
Olive Rose Steele	672	5.15%
Matanat Khan	525	4.02%
Gilbert Vesleno	375	2.87%
Terry Pierce, Jr.	198	1.52%
Sean Semper-Whyte	98	0.75%
Ward 7
Nando Iannicca (X)	5815	65.64%
Shane McNeil	1396	15.76%
Beju Lakhani	1054	11.90%
Sam Arora	594	6.71%
Ward 8
Katie Mahoney (X)	9157	79.43%
Anthony Fernando	1316	11.41%
Thomas Holowczak	713	6.18%
Malih Siddiqi	343	2.98%
Ward 9
Pat Saito (X)	6128	70.74%
Bill McBain	1829	21.11%
Michael Johnson	351	4.05%
Fernando Rodrigues	159	1.84%
Joe Baptista	103	1.19%
Antonio Ferreira Baptista	93	1.07%
Ward 10
Sue McFadden	3086	32.44%
Craig Lawrence	1072	11.27%
Elias Hazineh	786	8.26%
John Briers	606	6.37%
Tony Ciufo	558	5.87%
Barbara Polis	520	5.47%
Patrick Mendes	512	5.38%
Dale D'Souza	465	4.89%
Jack Janiak	448	4.71%
Adnan Hashmi	309	3.25%
Ishrat Nasim	239	2.51%
Fasal Javaid	149	1.57%
Ali Tahmourpour	145	1.52%
Jamie Dookie	142	1.49%
Richard Pereira	97	1.02%
Gwen Llewellyn	87	0.91%
Scott Wilson	83	0.87%
Shah Rukh Alam	73	0.77%
Brodrick Eldon Thorpe	52	0.55%
Mike Sesek	31	0.33%
Peter Dallas	24	0.25%
Euclid Prag	16	0.17%
Graziano Roti	13	0.14%
Ward 11
George Carlson (X)	4789	66.86%
Peter Judd	2094	29.23%
Xavier G. Pasicolan	280	3.91%
