= 2014 Peel Region municipal elections =

Municipal elections in Ontario, Canada

Elections were held in the Regional Municipality of Peel of Ontario on October 27, 2014, in conjunction with municipal elections across the province.

Mayoral campaigns were won by Allan Thompson in Caledon, Linda Jeffrey in Brampton, and Bonnie Crombie in Mississauga. Newly re-elected Mississauga councillor Frank Dale was voted by 14 of 24 Regional councillors as the new Chair of the Region of Peel.

== Peel Regional Council ==
Position	Elected
Chair	Frank Dale
Brampton Mayor	Linda Jeffrey
Brampton Wards 1 & 5	Elaine Moore
Brampton Wards 2 & 6	Michael P. Palleschi
Brampton Wards 3 & 4	Martin Medeiros
Brampton Wards 7 & 8	Gael Miles
Brampton Wards 9 & 10	John Sprovieri
Caledon Mayor	Allan Thompson
Caledon Ward 1	Barb Shaughnessy
Caledon Ward 2	Johanna Downey
Caledon Ward 3 & 4	Jennifer Innis
Caledon Ward 5	Annette Groves
Mississauga Mayor	Bonnie Crombie
Mississauga Ward 1	Jim Tovey
Mississauga Ward 2	Karen Ras
Mississauga Ward 3	Chris Fonseca
Mississauga Ward 4	Frank Dale
Mississauga Ward 5	Carolyn Parrish
Mississauga Ward 6	Ron Starr
Mississauga Ward 7	Nando Iannicca
Mississauga Ward 8	Matt Mahoney
Mississauga Ward 9	Pat Saito
Mississauga Ward 10	Sue McFadden
Mississauga Ward 11	George Carlson

=== Regional chair ===
The list of individuals interested in candidacy include:

- Steve Mahoney, former MP, MPP, Mississauga Regional councillor
- Pat Mullin, former Mississauga Regional councillor
- Richard Paterak, former Caledon Regional councillor
- John Sanderson, former Brampton Regional councillor
- Shelley White, CEO, United Way of Peel
- Frank Dale, Mississauga City Councillor Ward 4

Hazel McCallion has cautioned current Mississauga councillors from seeking the seat, or voting for a current Regional councillor, as this would trigger a $500,000 by-election or an appointment. Frank Dale won the appointment by a single vote over John Sanderson which he cast for himself.

== Brampton ==
2014 Brampton mayoral election
- October 27, 2014
- Turnout: 36.20%
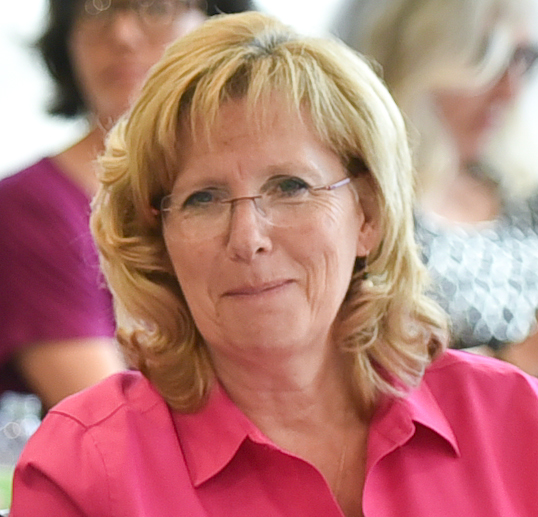

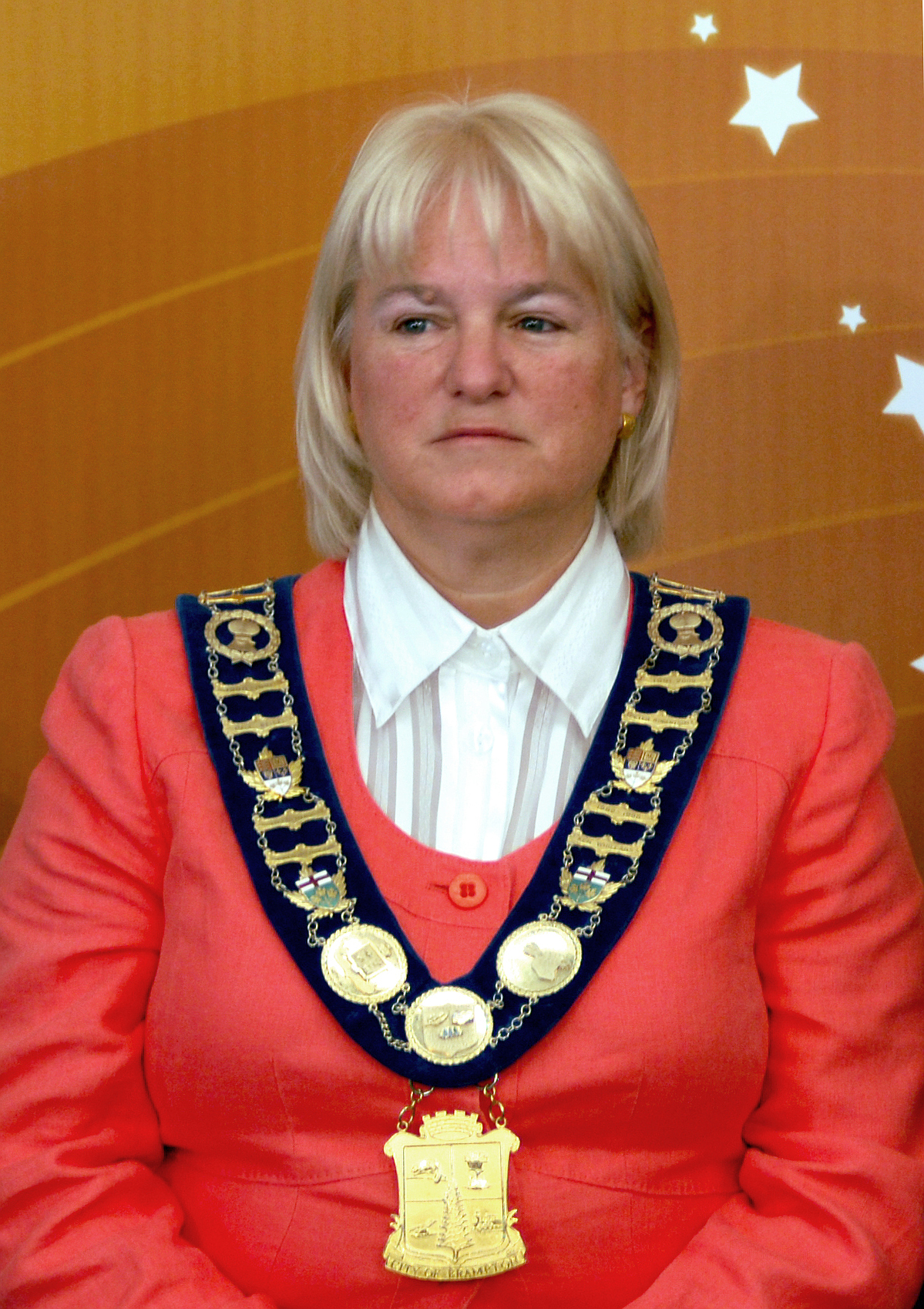
Candidate	Linda Jeffrey	John Sanderson	Susan Fennell
Popular vote	51,061	22,337	12,975
Percentage	49.33%	21.58%	12.54%
Mayor before election
Susan Fennell
Elected mayor
Linda Jeffrey

The 2014 Brampton municipal election was held on October 27, 2014, in Brampton, Ontario, Canada, to elect the Mayor of Brampton, Brampton City Council and the Brampton members of the Peel District School Board (Public) and Dufferin-Peel Catholic District School Board. The election is being held in conjunction with the province wide 2014 municipal elections.

=== Mayor of Brampton ===
There were eleven Mayoral candidates in Brampton.

Candidate	Vote	%	Notes
Linda Jeffrey	51,061	49.33	Former Brampton City Councillor (1991–2003), MPP for Brampton Centre and Brampton—Springdale (2003–2014), Minister of Natural Resources, Labour, Seniors and Municipal Affairs and Housing, and Chair of Cabinet
John Sanderson	22,336	21.58	Officially lending their support are City Councillors Bob Callahan, John Hutton, and Grant Gibson and Regional Councillors Elaine Moore and John Sprovieri.
Susan Fennell (X)	12,975	12.54	
Gurjit S. Grewal	3,464	3.35	
Donald McLeod	2,782	2.69	Scrap metal broker, owns company. In an interview with The Brampton Guardian, his focus was on accountability. Roads, urban sprawl, and quality of life were also mentioned.
Jacqueline Bell	2,187	2.11	
Ranjit Singh	2,085	2.01	
Muhammad Haque	1,848	1.79	
Baljit Bobby More	1,304	1.26	
Sukhjinder S. Gill	878	0.85	
Hargurnar Randhawa	749	0.72	Ran in the 2010 election for Mayor of Brampton, placing fourth of five.
Devinder Sangha	731	0.71	
Miriam Wylie	473	0.46	

==== Withdrawn ====
- John Ish Ishmael, withdrew in February
- Fazal Khan, now registered as a candidate for Wards 2 & 6 on city council.
- Sewak Singh Manak

==== Polling ====
Forum Research for The Toronto Star, January 18, 2014

31%	34%	19%	16%
Susan Fennell	John Sanderson	Navdeep Bains	Don't know

Forum Research for The Toronto Star, April 27, 2014

18%	26%	39%	17%
Susan Fennell	John Sanderson	Linda Jeffrey	Don't know

Forum Research for The Toronto Star, August 7 and 8, 2014 (1178 Brampton voters):

13%	24%	39%	24%
Susan Fennell	John Sanderson	Linda Jeffrey	Undecided

Forum Research for The Toronto Star, September 27, 2014 (928 Brampton voters):

17%	17%	42%	5%	3%	3%	13%
Susan Fennell	John Sanderson	Linda Jeffrey	R.	G.	S.	Undecided

Initials refer to candidates Hargy Randhawa, Gurjit Grewal, and Devinder Sangha.

Mainstreet Research, October 2, 2014:

13%	20%	36%	5%	27%
Susan Fennell	John Sanderson	Linda Jeffrey	Baljit More	Undecided

Mainstreet Research, October 2, 2014, of only those certain to vote:

12%	24%	38%	4%	22%
Susan Fennell	John Sanderson	Linda Jeffrey	Baljit More	Undecided

Forum Research for The Toronto Star, October 16, 2014 (1,020 Brampton voters):

14%	27%	42%	14%
Susan Fennell	John Sanderson	Linda Jeffrey	Other

Mainstreet Research, October 21, 2014 (1,602 Brampton voters):

11%	27%	34%	5%	5%	19%
Susan Fennell	John Sanderson	Linda Jeffrey	Baljit More	Someone Else	Undecided

=== Regional council ===
Candidate	Vote	%	Notes
Wards 1 & 5
Vidya Sagar Gautam	1158	6.87	
Elaine Moore	8784	52.07	Incumbent.
Krishawn Thompson	707	4.19	
Paul Vicente	6219	36.87	Promoted a livable city; supported transit initiatives; pledged to hold regular town hall meetings for improved resident engagement; maintain employment lands for jobs; pledged to advocate for completion of Peel Memorial Phase 2.
Wards 2 & 6
Victoria Colbourne			
John Hutton			Hutton was the incumbent for these wards as a City Councillor.
Mandeep Jassal			Brampton School Traffic Safety Council member.
Sean Kean			
Jai Naraine			
Michael Paul Palleschi			
Wards 3 & 4
Amir Ali			
Penelope Batey			
Divina De Buono			
Shan Gill			
John Raymond Grant			Aims to change the Region's waste to energy plan by building plasma gasification plants; by doing so, he expects the lower hydro rates will return manufacturing to Brampton. Other priorities are to develop new revenue streams for the City, improve the City's delivery of services.
Steve Kavanagh			Served five terms as a Peel District School Board trustee. On registration he noted that the municipal audit spurred him to run, saying he has built a reputation on following policy and being frugal.
Joseph Kus			Ran for Councillor, Ward 6 of Oakville, 2006. His only campaign priority provided to the Brampton Guardian is Parks and Recreation programs for people aged 35 to 55. He did not provide the Guardian with a photograph of himself, his occupation, or an explanation of why he was running for council. Parks and Recreation is run by the City of Brampton, not the Region.
Robert Lackey			
Sean Leiba			Management and e-commerce consultant; small business mentor, math tutor, and father. Platform includes accountability, gridlock, platform includes scrapping the LRT, businesses and jobs, education, community building.
Robert Mall			Finished four of five candidates in the 2010 election for City Councillor, Wards 3 & 4.
Garnett Manning			
Martin Mederios			Senior Policy Advisor, Province of Ontario; volunteering for Portuguese community organizations, health fundraising, his church. Platform includes transparency, accountability, job opportunities, transportation, education, training opportunities.
Kevin Montgomery			
Evie O'Malley			
Lynda Sacco			
Raguhbir Singh			
Wards 7 & 8
Mir Ali			
Christine Allen			
Logan Anderson			Previously registered for city council.
Gael Miles			Incumbent. Miles is the only incumbent endorsed by Mayor Fennell.
Blair Nicholson			
Cheryl Rodricks			
Manjit Bhondhi Saini			
Jotvinder Sodhi			
Wards 9 & 10
Paramjit Singh Birdi			
Jagdip Hayer			
Julie McPhee			
Michelle Shaw			
Gurratan Singh			
JD Singh			
John Sprovieri			Incumbent.
Harkanwal S. Thind			Thind was the runner up in the 2010 election with 7071 votes (31.7%). He is a local business owner and community activist involved with many local organizations including as a director of iRock Pink (a cancer awareness and fundraising group that donates annually to Wellspring Chiguacousy), a founder member of Indo-Canadian Friends of Osler (a group pledging to raise $1 Million for William Osler hospitals), and is a member of the Brampton Board of Trade and Indo-Canada Chamber of Commerce.

==== Withdrawn ====
- Wards 3 & 4: Janice Gordon, Ryan O'neil Knight
- Wards 7 & 8: Jacqueline Bell (became a candidate for Mayor), Clement Osei Tutu
- Wards 9 & 10: Gugni Gill Panaich (became the NDP candidate for Brampton West)

=== City council ===
Candidate	Vote	%
Brampton Wards 1 & 5
Grant Gibson	7378	44.2
Steve Kerr	3063	18.35
Maureen Harper	1553	9.3
David Lozowsky	1257	7.53
Inderjit Sidhu	943	5.65
Reg Ewles	906	5.43
Munir Amir	637	3.82
Mustafa Omarkhail	445	2.67
Prakash Harpal	376	2.25
Shiv Sibal	133	0.8

Incumbent Grant Gibson won with a healthy margin, as did his close ally, Regional Councillor Elaine Moore. Gibson endorsed the candidacy of John Sanderson for mayor. Gibson and Elaine Moore were the only councillors to post their expenses online before the public focus on accountability. Gibson's top challengers were Steve Kerr, a certified youth counselor/education liaison and entrepreneur, and Maureen Harper, a veterinarian, recently retired from the Canadian Food Inspection Agency.

Candidate	Vote	%	Notes
Brampton Wards 2 & 6
Ojie Eghobor			
Ros Feldman			
Ralph Irving Greene			Formerly a trustee, current campaign asks for voters to "re-elect" Greene.
Sukhminder Hansra			
Terrence Harrison			
Cassian Joseph			
Usman Khalid			
Fazal Khan			Previously registered as a candidate for mayor.
Lawrence Manickam			
Gurpreet Pabla			
Drew Riedstra			Ran for Halton Hills Town Council in 2006, placing third; he had run once prior.
Sushil Tailor			
Doug Whillans			Son of the late Mayor of Brampton Ken Whillans. One of eight candidates for this seat in 2010 coming in second after John Hutton; Hutton is no longer running for city council and is instead running for regional council.
Linda Zanella			Dufferin-Peel Catholic District School Board trustee for Brampton Wards 2, 5 and 6 for 16 years. Zanella has considered city politics for "some time", but wasn't comfortable running against incumbent Hutton. Hutton is now running for Regional council.
Brampton Wards 3 & 4
Jeff Bowman			
Nisar Butt			
Michael Freeman			
Parminder Singh Grewal			
Robert Donald Gallie Lee			
C. Jean Jamieson			
Andre Levy			Levy is an electro-mechanical engineer, automation & robotics tech. Five of his priorities are accountability, mayor/council salary, transparency, jobs, poverty.
Maria Peart			Finished 4th of 8 in the 2006 election for City Councillor, Wards 3 & 4.
Frank B. Raymond			
Shivani Shiromany			
Daniel Yeboah			
Brampton Wards 7 & 8
Ajay Malhotra			Volunteers call him the "Common-sense" Councillor. He talks about real common-sense solutions to City problems like "Facilities should be built at the rate and speed of housing development." and that Local taxes should remain local.
Khalid Alvi			
Karla Bailey			
Franca Blandino			
James Drozdiak			
Pat Fortini			
Damindar Singh Ghumman			
Amarjit Grewal			
Manan Gupta			
Subbiah Manickam			
Pam Marwaha			
Archibald Davie McLachlan			
Roland Parsons			
Cheryl Rodricks			
Veenay Sehdev			
Sohan Singh			
Joseph Tanti			
Brampton Wards 9 & 10
Allison Brown			
Vicky Dhillon			Incumbent.
Gurpreet Singh Dhillon			
Avtar Singh Gill			
Jarnail (Sunny) Singh			

==== Withdrawn ====
- Wards 1 & 5: Wesley Rampersad, a former Region of Peel case worker, terminated in August 2013. Peel Regional Police Fraud Bureau investigations found a total of $189,000 was paid to what police allege were fake client claims. Detectives arrested Rampersad on charges May 1, 2014, laying multiple charges.
- Wards 3 & 4: Adam Holly, Kevin Montgomery (re-registered as a Regional Council candidate)
- Wards 7 & 8: Logan Anderson (re-registered as a candidate for Regional Council), Joseph Tanti

=== Timeline ===
==== 2014 ====
- January 7: The Star also runs an editorial critical of Fennell, suggesting that it is "becoming near-impossible to ignore Fennell's spending scandals and her attempts to keep the information secret, which have tainted her reputation as mayor and dominated city council," expressing concern that she is a distraction to the City, during its continued growth.
- February 10: John Sanderson registers as a candidate for mayor. The Globe notes Sanderson as the first "experienced challenger", highlighting his "extensive six-part platform".
- March 23: Brampton-Springdale MPP Linda Jeffrey (Liberal) confirms that she will resign as both a Member of Provincial Parliament and Municipal Affairs Minister on the March 25. She did not confirm that she was running for Mayor of Brampton, stating to The Star that she was the nominated candidate for the riding. Jeffrey is a former Brampton councillor. Both Fennell and Sanderson were quick to issue statements connecting her with Liberal government issues like eHealth, Ornge, and gas plant cancellations.
- March 24 and 25: A leaked memo reveals that Mayor Fennell asked the city treasurer to initiate a "stop of salary", at the end of October, before a salary report release. The move effectively dropped her from the position as Canada's highest paid mayor, by refusing acceptance of her November and December pay. Council must approve changes to the mayor's salary, and many councillors suggested the move was illegal. Sanderson questioned the act of cutting salary in the lead up to an election. Group Citizens For a Better Brampton questioned whether she can reverse the decision after the election, and receive the back owed pay.
- March 26: Susan Fennell issues a statement that she will be stepping aside from duties as mayor for an undisclosed period, as her husband has been admitted for open heart surgery. Regional Councillor John Sprovieri serves as acting mayor in a session of council. He will hold the position for the remainder of March; Bob Callahan was to by acting mayor in April. Later in the day, Fennell's spokesperson announces she will return by the next meeting of council.
- April 2:
  - Former Councillor and MPP Linda Jeffrey enters the Mayoral race.
  - Toronto Star runs a front-page story on Fennell and her staff's charges to City credit cards. An editorial says either Jeffrey or Sanderson "would be a better mayor than the incumbent."
- May 1: Linda Jeffrey launches her campaign.
- May 21: Fennell's privately run Mayor's Gala has only dispersed $442,005 to community groups in 2012 and 2013 combined, from $1,710,106 raised, little over a quarter of funds raised, Toronto Star reports.
- May 27: Toronto Star reports that a company owned by a "close personal friend" of Fennell has received 453 City contracts since 2001, all under the competitive tendering process minimum, totalling $1.1 million. The company, MeriMac, has also been paid by Fennell's own organization to organize its charitable gala and golf tournaments since 2008. Ching lives in a house owned by Fennell. An editorial the same day suggests that the Mayor's "years of misrule warrant a crushing defeat".
- May 28: A result of the Star article, City Council votes to replace Integrity Commissioner Donald Cameron, who had cleared Fennell. Once a new Commissioner is hired, councillors intend to file an immediate complaint on the grounds that the previous investigation was misled.
- May 29: Fennell goes on CBC Metro Morning to defend her actions, saying the Star story is "filled with inaccuracies"; the Star reiterates that Fennell and Ching refused to reply to repeated questions before the story was published. She assured host Matt Galloway she does not mix personal life and business. Also on CBC, Fennell commented that various councillors have been displaying "outrageous, shameful conduct". She described the tactic as "silly season" to get in the way of Brampton receiving a university campus.
- September 5: Social Justice Collaborative holds Brampton's first debate of the campaign, at the Peel Art Gallery, Museum and Archives. Coverage of the debate focused largely around spending practices by Fennell and council.
- September 10
  - Before the final council meeting of the term, Fennell calls a press conference to announce she is pursuing legal action against critical councillors, the Toronto Star, and Deloitte Canada, which was hired by the City to do a forensic audit. "I've had it up to here with the lies the innuendo and the smears."
- September 12: Susan Fennell threatens to boycott the Brampton Board of Trade's debate, after several candidates suggested the event was anti-democratic and discriminatory. BBOT members were asked to vote on which candidates should attend. Jaipaul Massey-Singh, Board of Trade chair-elect, responded that the selection process was "in order to properly engage candidates in discussion of their platforms. The BBOT is concerned that if all candidates are invited to speak, individuals will then simply state their positions with little or no opportunity for them to challenge one another or for panelists to hold them accountable in their answers. Recent local debates that have invited all candidates to participate have shown this to be the case." If anyone does not participate, the BBOT will replace them with the candidate with the next highest number of votes.
- September 16: BBOT drops Susan Fennell from the BBOT debate. Self-employed farmer Jacqueline Bell will take the fourth spot, joining Jeffreys, Sanderson, and McLeod. Hargy Randhawa is also added. Devinder Sangha issues a press release calling their actions "knee jerk", suggesting Randhawa was "invited directly by the BBOT in spite of his entering the Mayoral race at the last minute and being the lowest voted candidate in the previous Mayoral election." Randhawa received over 13% of the vote in 2010, finishing fourth of five candidates.
- September 24: Brampton CAO John Corbett confirms that Deloitte has decided to "stop providing advice to the city." A new auditing firm must be hired to determine repayment amounts. Councillors talking to the media suggest that, due to legal action, the issue is impossible to revisit before the election.
- September 29: The BBOT debate at Sheridan College happens as scheduled. While Fennell remained uninvited, she talked to media outlets including CP24, and tweeted responses to the debate.
- October 2: Attention moved from Fennell to Jeffrey in the Brampton Young Professionals Forum debate, with the incumbent, Sanderson, and Sangha suggesting that the Province didn't help the City. Jeffrey suggested the City missed opportunities: "sat on the bench and did not chase the puck".
- October 5: A senior solicitor for Brampton, Colin Grant, is revealed to be no longer with the City.
- October 6:
  - Fennell, Sanderson, and Jeffrey appear on CP24 program LeDrew Live. Fennell dubs the controversy as "manufactured scandals". Sanderson suggests Jeffrey double crossed him, suggesting during the ice storm that she was not interested in running for Mayor of Brampton.
  - An anonymous attack ad, directed at Jeffrey, is released on YouTube. Citing its production values and professional narration, Jeffrey's campaign suggests that it is connected to a "well financed individual or group."
- October 16: A poll conducted by Forum finds 68% of voters want Fennell to resign, up from 63% in September.
- October 24:
  - Arbitrator Janet Leiper released a report, finding that the amount to be owed by Fennell as $3,522.97, less than the roughly $34,000 indicated in the audit.
  - After a press conference held by Fennell on the porch of her Terra Cotta Crescent house, supporters throw room-temperature coffee in the face of Toronto Star reporter San Grewal.
- November 26: United Way of Peel officials say they are looking into code of ethics complaints, related to CEO Shelley White's endorsement of Jeffreys.

=== Debates ===
List of Debates
Date	Hosted by	Participants	Location	Moderator	Ref
September 4	Social Justice Collaborative	Fennell, Jeffreys, Sanderson, Sangha, four others; the debate also included two Caledon Mayoral candidates	Peel Art Gallery, Museum and Archives		
September 29	Brampton Board of Trade	Bell, Jeffreys, McLeod, Randhawa, Sanderson	Sheridan College Davis Campus		
October 2	Brampton Young Professionals Forum	Fennell, Jeffreys, Sanderson, Sangha	Old Shoe Factory	Jahmeelah Gamble	
October 9	Brampton Board of Trade and Rogers TV	All candidates			
October 16	Central Peel Secondary School students	Bell, Haque, Jeffrey, McLeod, Randhawa, Sangha; Fennell was announced but did not attend	Central Peel Secondary School		

== Caledon ==
Registration for the 2014 election in Caledon had a slow start compared to other municipalities; the first Council registration was incumbent Gord McClure, on February 14.

=== Mayor of Caledon ===
There are currently two Mayoral candidates in Caledon.

Incumbent Marolyn Morrison is not seeking a fourth term in office; her husband intends to retire from teaching in 2015. Morrison experienced continued intimidation from developers throughout her term of office, including an attack on her husband that caused temporary vision damage.

Candidate	Vote	%	Notes
Allan Thompson	7,822	48.48	First elected as Regional Councillor for Ward 2 in 2003. Issues include managing sustainable growth.
Ian Sinclair	3,091	19.16	Served as area and regional councillor between 1994 and 2003 in Ward 1, director and president of former Caledon Ratepayers Association between 1979 and 1986. Issues include public consultation, tax rates, and urban design.
Gary Cascone	2,898	17.96	
Nancy Stewart	2,199	13.63	
George Niras	123	0.76	Niras has dropped out of the election, but will remain on the ballot. He has endorsed Gary Cascone.

Chris Harker, a former Ward 5 Regional Councillor, registered from August 13; he withdrew August 18, due to "a sudden and unforeseen personal matter".

=== Regional Councillor ===
Those elected as a Regional Councillor serve both on Town of Caledon council and Region of Peel council.

Candidate	Vote	%	Notes
Caledon Ward 1
Barb Shaughnessy	1442	49.50	
Richard Paterak (X)	1103	37.86	
Jim Pattison	368	12.63	
Caledon Ward 2
Johanna Downey	2465	80.69	
Mark Radford	590	19.31	
Caledon Ward 3 & 4
Jennifer Innis	2752	57.45	Former executive assistant to Mayor Morrison, previously worked with various Progressive Conservative politicians. Innis public addressed rumours of her candidacy in September 2013.
Richard Whitehead (X)	1309	27.33	In municipal office 21 of the last 25 years. Wants to work on ongoing development plans for Bolton and Caledon East, safety issues in Palgrave, and a watershed master plan.
Tony Viola	729	15.22	Previously ran in the 1988, 2007, and 2010 elections.
Caledon Ward 5
Annette Groves	2676	50.75	
Patti Foley (X)	2597	49.25	

=== Area Councillor ===
Those elected as an Area Councillor serve only on the Town of Caledon council, not the Region of Peel council.

Candidate	Vote	%	Notes
Caledon Ward 1
Doug Beffort (X)			
Paul Revell			
Caledon Ward 2
Yevgenia Casale			
Gord McClure (X)			
Caledon Ward 3 & 4
Pushpa Ashanagari			
Romeo Jack Barbosa			
Nick deBoer (X)			
Doug Maskell			
Caledon Ward 5
Andrei Belooussov			
Kevin Junor			
Adam Romasco			
Rob Mezzapelli (X)			
Trudy Valier			

=== Debates ===
List of Debates
Date	Hosted by	Participants	Location	Moderator	Ref
September 4	Social Justice Collaborative	Ian Sinclair, Allan Thompson	Peel Art Gallery, Museum and Archives		
September 23	Caledon Chamber of Commerce	all mayoral candidates, school board trustees and the candidates for Ward 5	Albion Bolton Community Centre		
September 25	Caledon Chamber of Commerce	all mayoral candidates, school board trustees and the candidates for Ward 1, Ward 2, and Ward 3 and 4	Caledon Community Complex		

== Mississauga ==
=== Mayor of Mississauga ===
2014 Mississauga mayoral election
- October 27, 2014
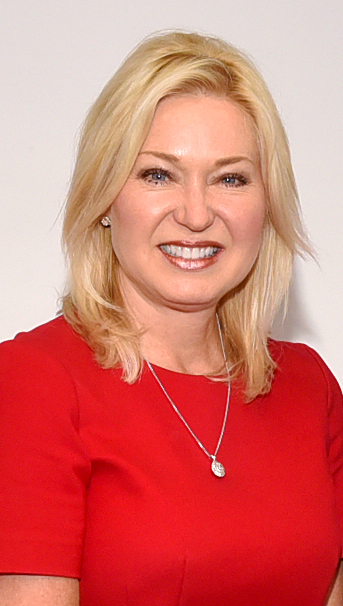
		SM
Candidate	Bonnie Crombie	Steve Mahoney
Popular vote	102,346	46,224
Percentage	63.49%	28.68%
Mayor before election
Hazel McCallion
Elected mayor
Bonnie Crombie

The mayoral race in Mississauga was noted for the retirement of Hazel McCallion, who had served as the city's mayor since 1978 and often faced only token opposition in past campaigns, thus giving rise to the city's first genuinely competitive mayoral race in many years. The leading candidates were Bonnie Crombie and Steve Mahoney, both former Members of Parliament. A third former MP, Carolyn Parrish, was widely believed to be a potential candidate as well, but instead confirmed her intention to run for a council seat rather than for mayor.

Through much of the year, Mahoney and Crombie were effectively tied in public opinion polling; although Mahoney led slightly in most polls, his lead rarely exceeded the poll's margin of error. Both candidates' platforms were nearly identical, with the only substantive point of distinction between them being Mahoney's proposal to implement high-occupancy vehicle lanes on some city streets as an interim measure, while working toward the longer-term implementation of rapid transit improvements that both candidates favoured. In early October, however, McCallion made a speech in which, while stopping short of calling it an official endorsement, she appeared to favour Crombie as her successor; the speech almost immediately vaulted Crombie into a 25-point lead over Mahoney.

There were a total of 10 registered candidates.

Candidate	Vote	%	Notes
Bonnie Crombie	102,346	63.49	55. Former Mississauga Ward 5 councillor (2011-2014), former Mississauga—Streetsville MP (2008-2011).
Steve Mahoney	46,224	28.68	66. Former Mississauga Ward 8 councillor (1978–1987), former Mississauga West MPP (1987–1995), former Mississauga West MP (1997–2004). Initial platform is entirely fiscally themed; linking tax increases to inflation, core services review, seek outside advice on City spending, adopt participatory budgeting using social media and crowd sourcing.
Dil Muhammad	2,429	1.51	75. Retired CEO of Pharm Canada and Vivo Canadian.
Stephen King	1,874	1.16	
Masood Khan	1,254	0.78	
Donald Barber	1,225	0.76	
Derek Ramkissoon	1,044	0.65	52. Resident of Orchard Heights. Owns "staffing, employment and investment companies." Founder of the non-profit In Christ Alone Ministry. Wants to bring skilled labour to Mississauga, For gridlock, wants to create peak period dedicated truck lanes.
Scott E. W. Chapman	868	0.54	24. born in Mississauga, resident of Meadowvale. Educated at Humber College (comedy writing and performance), Seneca College (television production). Quit his job at an alarm company to become a full-time candidate. Admires Hazel McCallion and her "fiscal responsibility". Issues include transit and emergency preparedness. On announcing his nomination, he stopped tweeting.
Riazuddin Choudhry	790	0.49	70. resident of Cooksville. Retired. As of April, Choudhry and his campaign team are going into the community to establish what the issues are, so that he can establish a platform.
Paul Fromm	775	0.48	65. White nationalist racialist and perennial candidate.
Kevin Jackal Johnston	741	0.46	42. Resident of Meadowvale. Platform centres around reducing the number of by-laws, eliminating red light cameras, revitalizing the waterfront.
Andrew Seitz	507	0.31	Finished second last of 16 challengers to McCallion in the 2010 election.
Joe Lomangino	415	0.26	
Grant Isaac	392	0.24	
Sheraz Siddiqui	315	0.20	

Mike Shoss withdrew his nomination for mayor.

==== Endorsements ====
- Bonnie Crombie
  - Mississauga: Stella Ambler, Hazel McCallion (implied only), Luz del Rosario, Paul Szabo
  - Other: Dr. Carolyn Bennett, Dr. Kirsty Duncan, Art Eggleton, Andrew Kania, Dominic LeBlanc, Rob Oliphant, Yasmin Ratansi
- Steve Mahoney
  - Mississauga: Brad Butt, Bob Dechert, Bob Delaney, Albina Guarnieri, Councillor Sue McFadden, Gurbax Singh Malhi, Harinder Takhar
  - Other: Colleen Beaumier, Sarmite Bulte, Aileen Carroll, George Dadamo, Buzz Hargrove, John Manley, John McKay, Karen Redman, Brian Tobin

==== Polling ====
Forum Research, March

22%	29%	49%
Bonnie Crombie	Steve Mahoney	Don't know

Forum Research, April

25%	27%	48%
Bonnie Crombie	Steve Mahoney	Don't know

Forum Research, July

29%	31%	40%
Bonnie Crombie	Steve Mahoney	Don't know

Forum Research, August

26%	27%	47%
Bonnie Crombie	Steve Mahoney	Undecided

24%	24%	9%	43%
Bonnie Crombie	Steve Mahoney	Eve Adams (unregistered)	Undecided

Forum Research, September 28 (557 respondents)

36%	40%	9%	15%
Bonnie Crombie	Steve Mahoney	Steven King	Undecided

Forum Research, October 16 (769 respondents)

56%	31%	4%	9%
Bonnie Crombie	Steve Mahoney	Steven King	Undecided

===== Awareness polls =====
In mid-September 2014, Mahoney commissioned a poll of 824 people using interactive voice response. Main Street Technologies added the names of the three Toronto mayoral front-runners to Mississauga front-runners' names, to demonstrate Mahoney's observation that many Mississauga residents were unaware of the municipal election or its candidates. Mahoney's internal polling found that 63 to 66% of Mississauga residents are undecided as to their choice for mayor.

30%	35%	23%	12%
Bonnie Crombie	Steve Mahoney	Doug Ford*	Other

41%	29%	14%	16%
Bonnie Crombie	Steve Mahoney	Olivia Chow*	Other

29%	33%	21%	17%
Bonnie Crombie	Steve Mahoney	John Tory*	Other

=== City and Regional Council ===
Candidate	Vote	%	Notes
Ward 1
John Burrows	1,939	17.44%	
Winston Harding	243	2.19%	
Khalid Mahmood	118	1.06%	
Shane McNeil	601	5.40%	
Harvey Mihalic	309	2.78%	
Jim Tovey (X)	7,911	71.14%	Jim Tovey died January 15, 2018; term was completed by appointee David Cooke
Ward 2
John Armstrong	1,121	8.87%	
Laurence Kuysten	887	7.01%	
Ram Mustafa	459	3.63%	
Karen Ras (X)	3,544	28.03%	
Sue Shanly	3,091	24.44%	
Alvin Tedjo	2,310	18.27%	
Ward 3
Roma Ahmed	366	2.62%	
Chris Fonseca (X)	10,923	78.13%	
Phil Poyton	993	7.10%	
Elena Stoykovich	1,698	12.15%	
Ward 4
Ahmad Abu-Qurah	562	3.85%	
Frank Dale (X)	10,353	70.88%	Elected as Peel Regional Chair after 2014 municipal elections triggering by-election April 27, 2015
Antoni Kantor	1,999	13.69%	
Michael Madej	267	1.83%	
Hardat Prasad Sookraj	330	2.26%	
Barbara Tabuno	1,096	7.50%	
Ward 5
Aayesha Arshad Aamir	128	0.83	
Waseem Ahmed	1,597	10.38	President of the Mississauga East–Cooksville NDP riding association.
Samantha Angel	1,938	12.60	
Dianne Douglas	2,762	17.96	
Herman Hacikyan	482	3.13	
Jas Mangat	199	1.29	Married to Amrit Mangat, Mississauga-Brampton South MPP. He withdrew from the race, but his name remained on the ballot, as the announcement came after the September 12 withdrawal deadline.
Crystal Mark	552	3.59	
Carolyn Parrish (X)	6,025	39.18	Former Liberal MP (1993-2006) and City Councillor for Ward 6 (2006-2010)
Harman Singh	1,310	8.52	
Jayesh Trivedi	385	2.50	
Ward 6
Rami Al Saedi	209	1.20%	
Osmand Banguri	223	1.23%	
Gary Dunlop	876	5.05%	
Peter Ferreira			(withdrew) Catholic School trustee for Ward 6 & 11.
Rabia Khedr	2,593	14.94%	
Ghada Melek	3,064	17.65%	
Medhat Oweida	71	0.41%	
Ron Starr (X)	10,322	59.47%	
Ward 7
Zafar Ansari	1,134	8.14%	
Bassam Esbeit	675	4.85%	
Nando Iannicca (X)	8,421	60.48%	
Louroz Mercader	3,693	26.52%	
Ward 8
Amadeus Blazys	1,471	8.58%	
Louis R. Girard	1,027	5.99%	
Abbas Hussaini	157	0.92%	
Gerald Jackson	379	2.21%	
Mohammad Latif	1,120	6.54%	
Matt Mahoney (X)	7,522	43.89%	Son of previous councillor Katie Mahoney
Michael Miller	2,262	13.20%	
Rose Streete	809	4.72%	
Gen Volnyansky	191	1.11%	
Saskia Wijngaard	1,257	7.33%	
Cecil Young	943	5.50%	Ran in Ward 5, Malton, in the September 2011 by-election.
Ward 9
Delvon Greene	397	2.86%	Ran in the 2011 municipal election.
Aman Khan	1,452	10.44%	
Len Little	2,485	17.87%	
Sidney Mondoux	244	1.75%	Registered to run for council in Ward 9 on April 9, withdrawing the nomination on April 30. Registered to run in Ward 5 April 30, cancelled nomination September 10. Registered to run in Ward 10 on September 10.
Pat Saito (X)	9,065	65.20%	
Angeline Lorna Sankar	261	1.88%	
Ward 10
Delvon Greene	397	2.86%	
Jamie Dookie	474	3.19%	Ran in the 2011 by-election for Ward 5, receiving less than 1% of the vote. Did not complete legal financial returns following race and was banned from running for one term.
Kiru Kulendiren	1,592	10.71%	
Sue McFadden (X)	11,477	77.24%	
Paul Michael Preikschas	486	3.27%	
Ward 11
George Carlson (X)	8,964	68.20%	
Harlon Davey	451	3.43%	
Peter Fay	629	4.79%	
Imran Hasan	2,261	17.20%	
Gurmail Singh Saggu	839	6.38%	

==== Withdrawn ====
- Ward 3: Audrey Polanco
- Ward 5: Loveen Kaur Gill, Cheryl Rodricks
- Ward 6: Peter Ferreira
- Ward 7: Amir Ali, Jozef Lech, Anwar Bilal Mughal
- Ward 8: David Sousa, Albert Tan

Note that Sidney Mondoux was registered for Ward 9, then to Ward 5, and will appear on the ballot for Ward 9.

=== Debates ===
List of Debates
Date	Hosted by	Participants	Location	Moderator	Ref
September 8	Mississauga Arts Council and six other arts organizations	Scott Chapman, Bonnie Crombie, Kevin Johnston, Stephen King, Steve Mahoney, Derek Ramkissoon, Sheraz Siddiqui	RBC Theatre at Living Arts Centre	Khaled Iwamura	
September 11	Social Justice Collaborative	All candidates have accepted, except for Mike Shoss	Rogers Theatre at Living Arts Centre		
September 23	Greater Toronto NAIOP and SIOR Canada Central	Bonnie Crombie and Steve Mahoney	RBC Theatre at Living Arts Centre	Ted Woloshyn	
October 1	UTM Debating Club and Mississauga City Youth Council	Bonnie Crombie and Steve Mahoney	CCIT Building, University of Toronto Mississauga		

== School trustees ==
=== Peel District School Board ===
Janet McDougald was acclaimed as the chair of the Peel District School Board in a 1 December 2014 inaugural meeting.

==== Brampton ====
Wards 1, 5

Candidate	Vote	%	Notes
Indre Daboo	107	0.90	
David Green (X)	6382	53.61	
Chris Piechocki	514	4.32	
Rajbir Kaur Sidhu	897	7.53	
Surinder Sandhu	9.43	7.92	

Wards 2, 6

- Janet Atherley
- Michael Benoit
- William Davies
- Hardeep Kalirah
- Suzanne Nurse, incumbent
- Brittany Savaille
- Avtaar Soor
- Ravichandran Subbaian

Wards 3, 4

- Gurdeep Kaur Bhachu
- Lloyd Fournier
- Daljit Gill
- Rekha Joshi
- Ryan-O'Neil Knight
- Kathy McDonald
- Jagmohan Singh
- Stan Taylor

Wards 7, 8

- Devinder Singh Anand
- Carrie Andrews
- Shaheen Arshed
- Handell Patrick Buchanan
- Dezso Farkas
- Virginia Finbow
- Michael J. Gyovai
- Satpaul Singh Johal
- Christina MacLean
- Sunny Punia
- Amardeep Singh
- Lynne Lazare

Wards 9, 10

Candidate	Vote	%	Notes
Gurpreet Chungh	906	4.59%	
Albert Evans	3247	16.45%	
Baljit Singh Ghuman	1593	8.07%	
Harinderpal Hundal	1498	7.59%	
Rose Mary Parfitt	1127	5.71%	
Balpreet TJ Sandhu	1580	8.00%	
Gitu Sandhu	504	2.55%	
Meera Sharma	3139	15.90%	
Harkirat Singh (X)	5548	28.10%	
R A Syed Mohammed	599	3.03%	

Withdrawn

- Wards 2, 6: Daniel Yeboah
- Wards 3, 4: Steve Kavanagh

==== Caledon ====
- Stan Cameron (X)

==== Mississauga ====
Wards 1 and 7

- Janet McDougald, incumbent
- Greg Vosper
- Stephen Warner

Wards 2 and 8

- Yve Bernard
- Sophia Brown Ramsay
- Andrew Hamilton-Smith
- Brad Hutchinson
- Brad MacDonald, incumbent
- Virinderpaul Singh
- Muhammad Waris

Wards 3 and 4

- Rita Bindra
- Evan Engering
- Sue Lawton, incumbent
- Goran Saveski

Ward 5

- Deepak Anand
- Jason Benoit
- Rita Bindra
- Yasmeen Khan
- Ranjit Kaur Khatkur
- Karen Lin
- Virinderpaul Singh
- Rick Williams

Ward 6

- Josephine Bau
- Bernadette Chatwin
- Robert Crocker
- Marina Pedrosa Hrenar
- Linden King
- David Li
- Sathyanithy Sadagopan
- Ravi Sahni
- Paramvir Singh Sekhon
- Keval Shaw
- Birinder Shergill
- Farina Siddiqui
- Pam Tomasevic
- George Winter

Ward 9 and 10

- Hussain A Asghar
- Cameron Bogren
- Sandra Clarke
- Nokha Dakroub
- Meredith Johnson
- Iftikhar Malik
- Shannon Pecore
- Dani Schulze
- Michael Sesek
- Malih Siddiqi
- Albert Tan
- Allison Van Wagner
- Kathy Vukobrat
- Kathy Zhao

=== Dufferin-Peel Catholic District School Board ===
Brampton wards 1, 3, 4

- Mike Campeau
- Anna Maria da Silva - Incumbent
- Jefferson Huang
- Devanand Ramsumair

Brampton wards 2, 5, 6

- Darryl Brian D'Souza
- Denaize Joseph
- Thomas Joseph
- Frank R. Turner
- Carmen Wilson-Durston

Joseph Tanti withdrew his nomination, to run for Brampton City Council in Wards 7 & 8.

Brampton wards 7, 8, 9, 10

- Sylvia Aiello
- Mark Hoffberg
- Abraham Joseph
- Janice Gordon
- Mark Hoffberg
- Tara Elizebeth Nugent
- Lesley-Anne Raymer
- Shawn Xaviour

Caledon

- Krystina De Rose
- Frank Di Cosola
- Tony Meglio

Mississauga ward 1, 3

- Mario Pascucci
- Antu-Maprani Chakkunny

Mississauga ward 2, 8

- Corey Henderson
- Sharon M. Hobin, incumbent
- Arnold Rego

Mississauga ward 4

- Anna M. Abbruscato, incumbent
- Miroslaw Ruta

Mississauga ward 5

- Helene Burrowes
- Joseph Joseph

Mississauga ward 6, 11

- Josephine Bau
- Natalia Kusendova
- Luz del Rosario

Mississauga ward 7

- Patti-Ann Finlay
- Bruno Iannicca, incumbent

Mississauga ward 9, 10

- Esther O'Toole, incumbent

=== Conseil scolaire Viamonde ===
The following candidates are running in all of Peel. Locally, the schools represented are École élémentaire Carrefour des jeunes, École élémentaire Horizon Jeunesse, and École secondaire Jeunes sans frontières.

- Malika Attou, St. Catharines
- Mark David de Pelham, Mississauga
- Kris Nair, Mississauga
- Yvon Rochefort, Brampton

Withdrawn: Ravi Sahni

=== Conseil scolaire de district catholique Centre-Sud ===
Brampton and Caledon

École élémentaire catholique Sainte-Jeanne-d'Arc.

- Geneviève Grenier
- Tammy Knibbs
- Blaise Liaki

Mississauga

Schools represented locally in École élémentaire catholique René-Lamoureux, École élémentaire catholique Saint-Jean-Baptiste, and École secondaire catholique Sainte-Famille.

- Estelle Ah-Kiow
- Innocent Legrand Watat

=== Additional debates ===
List of Debates
Date	Hosted by/topic	Participants	Location	Moderator	Ref
August 12	Transit	14 candidates for Mayor of Brampton or Mississauga, or Regional council within Brampton or Mississauga; Brampton: Michael Freeman, Donald McLeod, Kevin Montgomery; Mississauga: Kevin Johnston, Masood Khan, Stephen King			
