= 2010 Peel Region municipal elections =

Ontario elections

Elections were held in the Regional Municipality of Peel of Ontario on October 25, 2010, in conjunction with municipal elections across the province.

== Peel Regional Council ==
Position	Elected
Chair	(non elected)
Brampton Mayor	Susan Fennell
Brampton Wards 1 & 5	Elaine Moore
Brampton Wards 2 & 6	Paul Palleschi
Brampton Wards 3 & 4	John Sanderson
Brampton Wards 7 & 8	Gael Miles
Brampton Wards 9 & 10	John Sprovieri
Caledon Mayor	Marolyn Morrison
Caledon Ward 1	Richard Paterak
Caledon Ward 2	Allan Thompson
Caledon Ward 3 & 4	Richard Whitehead
Caledon Ward 5	Patti Foley
Mississauga Mayor	Hazel McCallion
Mississauga Ward 1	Jim Tovey
Mississauga Ward 2	Pat Mullin
Mississauga Ward 3	Chris Fonseca
Mississauga Ward 4	Frank Dale
Mississauga Ward 5	Eve Adams
Mississauga Ward 6	Ron Starr
Mississauga Ward 7	Nando Iannicca
Mississauga Ward 8	Katie Mahoney
Mississauga Ward 9	Pat Saito
Mississauga Ward 10	Sue McFadden
Mississauga Ward 11	George Carlson

== Brampton ==
2010 Brampton mayoral election
- October 25, 2010
- Turnout: 33.13%
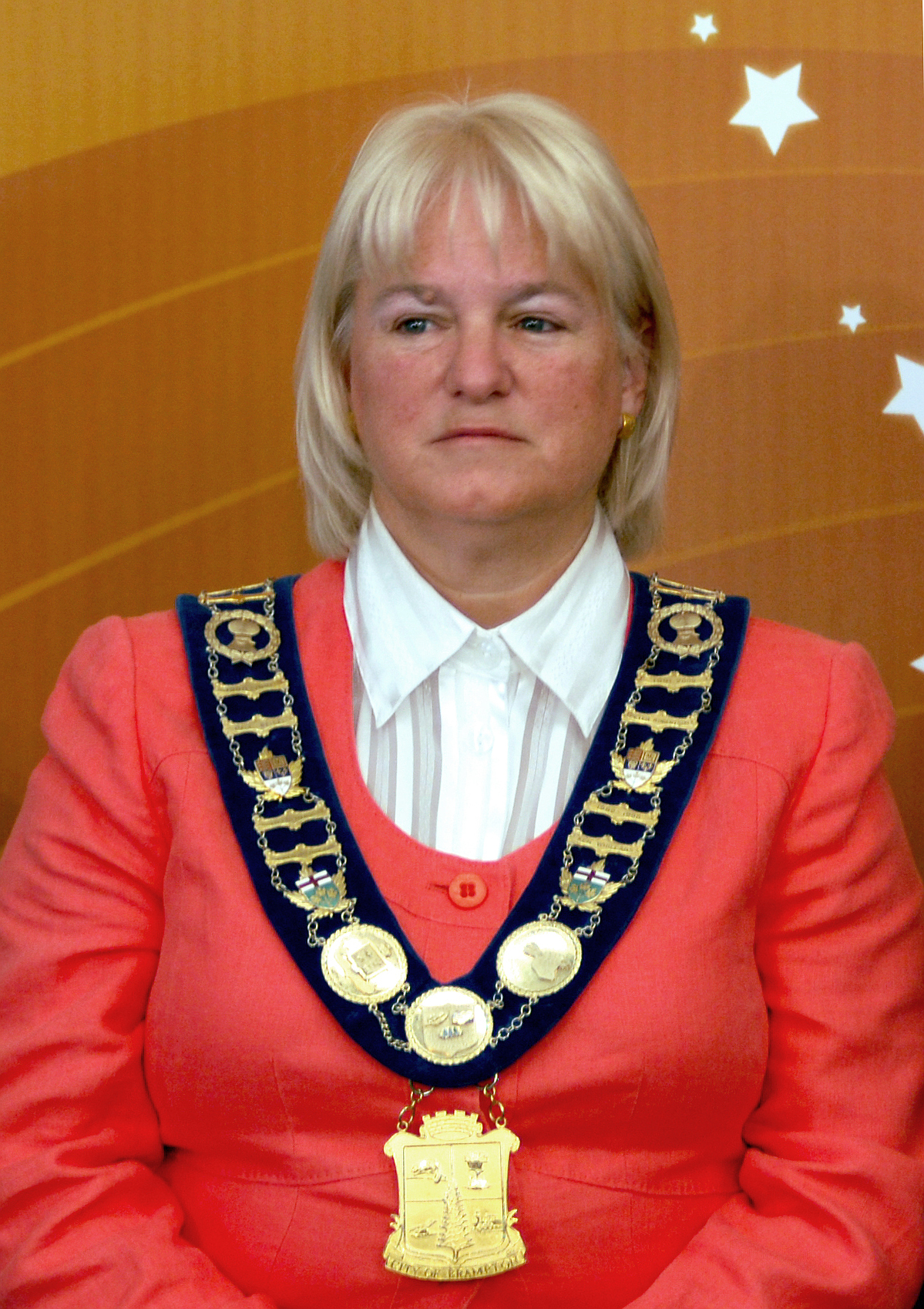
		BH
Candidate	Susan Fennell	Bruce Haines
Popular vote	42,991	15,299
Percentage	50.68%	18.03%
	GM	HR
Candidate	Garnett Manning	Hargy Randhawa
Popular vote	14,898	11,210
Percentage	17.56%	13.21%
Mayor before election
Susan Fennell
Elected mayor
Linda Jeffrey

=== Mayor ===
Candidate	Vote	%
Susan Fennell (X)	42,991	50.68
Bruce Haines	15,299	18.03
Garnett Manning	14,898	17.56
Hargy Randhawa	11,210	13.21
Hashi Ladak	436	0.51

=== City and Regional Council ===
Candidate	Vote	%
Brampton Wards 1 & 5
Elaine Moore (X)	8,964	77.20
Bob Hunter	2,647	22.80
Brampton Wards 2 & 6
Paul Palleschi (X)	8,033	44.26
Dal Singh Puar	4,124	22.72
Lenworth Carby	3,775	20.80
Larry Dupuis	1,460	8.04
Mandeep Singh Gill	566	3.12
Balwinder Singh	193	1.06
Brampton Wards 3 & 4
John Sanderson (X)	7,562	48.99
Susan DiMarco	4,462	28.91
Raguhbir Singh	3,161	20.48
Syed Taqvi	250	1.62
Brampton Wards 7 & 8
Gael Miles (X)	11,373	82.03
John Spry	2,492	17.97
Brampton Wards 9 & 10
John Sprovieri (X)	8,945	40.10
Harkanwal Thind	7,071	31.70
Frank Corvese	2,000	8.97
Vicky Colbourne	1,889	8.47
Kuldip Kandola	1,741	7.80
Neil Maharaj	662	2.97

=== City Council ===
Candidate	Vote	%
Wards 1 & 5
Grant Gibson (X)	9086	76.76%
Yaw Osei-Aning	884	7.47%
Bobby Sharma	1867	15.77%
Wards 2 & 6
John Hutton (X)	4880	26.84%
Princess Boucher	1085	5.97%
Inder Singh Chopra	1654	9.10%
Jassi Dhillon	1294	7.12%
Ralph Greene	2585	14.22%
Urz Heer	1646	9.05%
Steve Kerr	1625	8.94%
Doug Whillans	3412	18.77%
Wards 3 & 4
Bob Callahan (X)	8345	53.44%
Ana Dorkin	354	2.27%
Parminder Singh Grewal	3967	25.41%
Robert Mall	584	3.74%
Sheila Marie Moore	2365	15.15%
Wards 7 & 8
Sandra Hames (X)	8337	58.39%
James Drozdiak	703	4.92%
Pat Fortini	4822	33.77%
Ilyas Khokhar	417	2.92%
Ben Peterson	-	-
John Spry	-	-
Zafar Tariq	-	-
Wards 9 & 10
Vicky Dhillon (X)	12377	54.66%
Loreto Ceccarelli	1562	6.90%
Adriano Conti	735	3.33%
Frank Iorio	3327	14.69%
Dale Mundi	1767	7.80%
Harveen Sidhu	2857	12.62%

=== School Trustee ===
Candidate	Vote	%
Peel District School Board, Wards 1 & 3
David Green	6600	72.20%
Ian Irving	2541	27.80%
Peel District School Board, Wards 2 & 6
Mark Cashin	594	4.45%
Will Davies	1344	10.07%
Daljit Gill	2991	22.40%
Daniel Millard	524	3.92%
Suzanne Nurse	5086	38.09%
Carole Walker	2399	17.97%
Narendra Kumar Yadav	415	3.11%
Peel District School Board, Wards 4 & 5
Mandeep Dhugga	559	5.02%
Steve Kavanagh	4130	37.50%
Avi Rakhra	2364	21.21%
Anthony Sherwood	2767	24.83%
Ranjeet Singh	1326	11.90%
Peel District School Board, Wards 7 & 8
Mir Mushtaq Ali	524	5.20%
Roger Chadha	1358	13.47%
Beryl Ford	8197	81.33%
Peel District School Board, Wards 9 & 10
Jash Puniya	2453	12.73%
Harinder Malhi	9019	46.82%
Joy Adams	3242	16.83%
John Crowley	1633	8.48%
Fatima Devonish	439	2.28%
Mohan Singh Khangura	1838	9.54%
Yadwinder Sahota	191	0.99%
Devinder Jeet Singh	447	2.32%

Candidate	Vote	%
Dufferin-Peel Catholic District School Board, Wards 2, 5 & 6
Richard Patywich	1688	27.87%
Linda Zanella	4369	72.13%
Dufferin-Peel Catholic District School Board, Wards 7, 8, 9 & 10
Abraham Joseph	1827	26.58%
Scott McLaughlin	3450	50.20%
Scott Murdock	1074	15.63%
Indira Persaud	259	3.77%
Gertie Ugoh	263	3.83%

Candidate	Vote	%
French Separate - Conseiller scolaire, Conseil scolaire de district catholique Centre-Sud
Tamar Clutterbuck	113	28.46%
Tammy Knibs	284	71.54%

== Caledon ==
=== Mayor ===
Candidate	Vote	%
Marolyn Morrison (X)	11412	61.2
Annette Groves	7235	38.79

=== Regional and Town Council ===
Candidate	Vote	%
Caledon Ward 1
Richard Paterak (X)	1901	63.59
Tim Forster	1088	36.40
Caledon Ward 2
Allan Thompson (X)	1509	50.13
Tom Dolson	1017	33.78
Valerie Arnold-Judge	484	16.07
Caledon Wards 3 & 4
Richard Whitehead (X)	1929	34.12
Nancy Stewart	1663	29.42
Gary Caprara	1209	21.39
Tony Viola	851	15.05
Caledon Ward 5
Amanda Squire	1335	20.35
Mark Pavilons	1528	23.29
Patti Foley	2271	34.62
Gary Cascone	1425	21.72

=== Town Council ===
Candidate	Vote	%
Ward 1
Douglas Beffort (X)	2537	86.94
Gino Petricca	381	13.05
Ward 2
Gordon McClure (X)	1669	57.07
Jim Cassell	1255	42.92
Ward 3 & 4
Nick deBoer (X)	40.71	76.00
Dianne Henriques	1285	23.99
Ward 5
Kevin Junor		
Trudy Valier		
Rob Mezzapelli		
Luciano Di Palma		
Andrei Belooussov		

=== School Trustee, English Public ===
Candidate	Vote	%
Stan Cameron	8229	72.76
Fraser Williamson	3106	27.23

=== School Trustee, English Separate ===
Candidate	Vote	%
Frank Di Cosola	4459	84.67
Klaus Hertel	807	15.32

=== School Trustee, French Separate ===
Candidate	Vote	%
Tammy Knibbs	45	71.42
Tamar Cutterbuck	18	28.57

== Mississauga ==
=== Mayor ===
2010 Mississauga mayoral election
- October 25, 2010
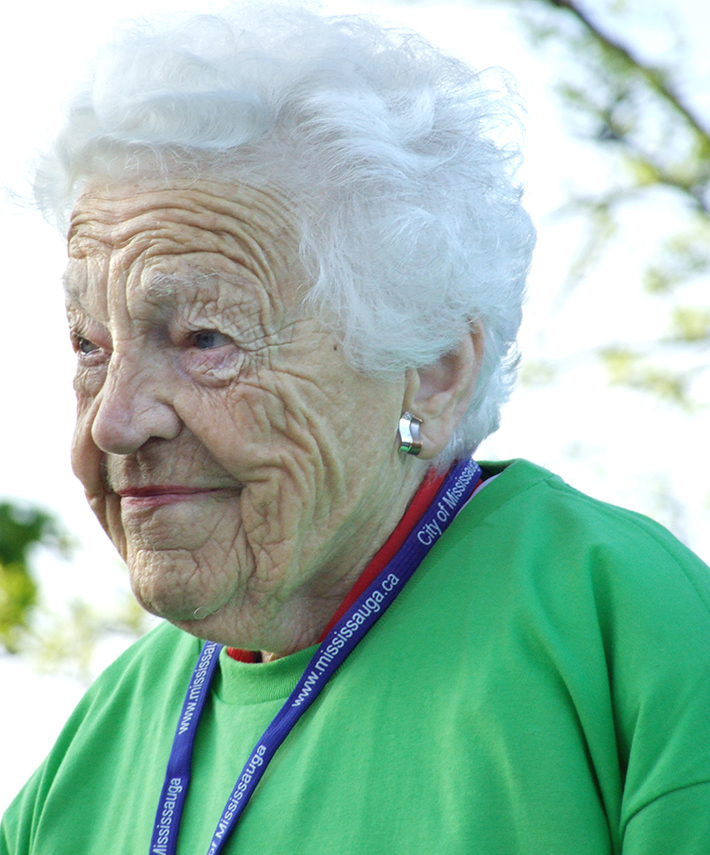
		DC
Candidate	Hazel McCallion	Dave Cook
Popular vote	107,643	10,744
Percentage	76.40%	7.63%
Mayor before election
Hazel McCallion
Elected mayor
Hazel McCallion

Candidate	Vote	%
Hazel McCallion (X)	107,643	76.40
Dave Cook	10,744	7.63
George Winter	4,783	3.39
Ranjit Chahal	4,199	2.98
Ghani Ahsan	3,744	2.66
Ram Selvarajah	2,241	1.59
Peter Orphanos	2,140	1.52
Donald Barber	1,513	1.07
Paul Fromm	917	0.65
Martin Marinka	644	0.46
Bryan Robert Hallett	575	0.41
Shirley Vanden Berg	516	0.37
Ursula Keuper-Bennett	329	0.23
Andy Valenton	293	0.21
Antu Maprani Chakkunny	249	0.18
Andrew Seitz	233	0.17
Innocent Watat	139	0.10

=== City and Regional Council ===
Candidate	Vote	%
Ward 1
Jim Tovey	5,246	49.71
Carmen Corbasson (X)	5,117	48.48
Kwaku Owusu	191	1.81
Ward 2
Pat Mullin (X)	8,957	85.97
Laura Manzer	1,179	11.32
Malih Siddiqi	283	2.72
Ward 3
Chris Fonseca	9,133	70.08
Elena Stoykovich	1,373	10.53
Joe Belcastro	790	6.06
Roger Devers	561	4.30
Frank Perrotta	539	4.14
Stephen Wahl	430	3.30
Winston Harding	207	1.59
Ward 4
Frank Dale (X)	7,596	59.15
Nance MacDonald	2,352	18.31
Mike Fisher	871	6.78
Goran Saveski	700	5.45
Bashir Khan	390	3.04
George Kairys	277	2.16
Nand Kumar Bhardwaj	257	2.00
Brian Chiasson	248	1.93
John Matthew	152	1.18
Ward 5
Eve Adams (X)	9,795	66.75
Simerjit Kaur	2,678	18.25
Ilyas Shaikh	849	5.79
Jagjit Grewal	514	3.50
David Brenn	453	3.09
Mahmood Malik	385	2.62
Ward 6
Ron Starr	8,361	51.78
Carolyn Parrish (X)	6,472	40.08
Fazli Manan	739	4.58
Ravi Sahni	576	3.57
Ward 7
Nando Iannicca (X)	6,721	60.04
Louroz Mercader	3,788	33.84
Zuhair Usmani	685	6.12
Ward 8
Katie Mahoney (X)	11,294	75.41
Joe Anzini	2,037	13.60
Amo Blazys	909	6.07
Peter Browne	737	4.92
Ward 9
Pat Saito (X)	7,654	67.22
Len Little	3,471	30.48
Adina Siemens Wace	262	2.30
Ward 10
Sue McFadden (X)	4,803	35.64
Patrick Mendes	2,816	20.90
Bill McBain	2,447	18.16
Mirza Baig	1,677	12.45
Danny Galang	709	5.26
Anannya Majumder	461	3.42
Jamie Dookie	324	2.40
Mary Nemeth	125	0.93
Shahrukh Alam	113	0.84
Ward 11
George Carlson (X)	5,234	47.65
Luz Del Rosario	4,165	37.92
Christine Simundson	800	7.28
Syed Saeed Sherazi	785	7.15

=== School Trustee, English Public ===
Candidate	Vote	%
Wards 1 & 7
Janet McDougald	10,508	82.88
Rosaria Nogueira	2,171	17.12
Wards 2 & 8
Brad MacDonald	7,792	50.55
Andrew Hamilton-Smith	3,683	23.89
Ben Robinson	2,574	16.70
Pappur Shankar	1,366	8.86
Wards 3 & 4
Sue Lawton	6,109	46.35
David Croome	3,578	27.15
John Tokarsky	1,871	14.20
Zahida Ida Ibrahim	1,622	12.31
Ward 5
Rick Williams	4,779	52.30
Prithpal Singh Chagger	2,963	32.43
Sue Tandon	1,395	15.27
Wards 6 & 11
Jeff White	6,182	39.95
Eddie Roberts	4,374	28.26
Rakesh Tandon	3,031	19.59
Aaron Sawatsky	1,888	12.20
Wards 9 & 10
Meredith Johnson	3,047	19.62
Allison Van Wagner	2,365	15.23
Usman Malik	2,256	14.52
Linden King	1,932	12.44
Kathy Zhao	1,848	11.90
Harvey Brant	1,514	9.75
David Raakman	1,242	8.00
Syed Saeed Ahmed	833	5.36
Varthan Arulsundaram	495	3.19

=== School Trustee, English Separate ===
Candidate	Vote	%
Wards 1 & 3
Mario Pascucci	6,278	78.10
Pat Bradbury	1,760	21.90
Wards 2 & 8
Sharon Hobin	Acclaimed	
Ward 4
Anna Abbruscato	Acclaimed	
Ward 5
Thomas Thomas	2,327	49.91
Mark Feres	1,490	31.96
Cheryl Rodricks	690	14.80
Romesh Hettiarachchi	155	3.32
Wards 6 & 11
Peter Ferreira	3,940	43.40
Dan Dukaczewski	2,028	22.34
Colette Munroe	1,277	14.07
Ward 7
Bruno Iannicca	Acclaimed	
Wards 9 & 10
Esther O'Toole	4,457	57.50
Ehretia O'Hearn	1,272	16.41
Michelle Bilek	1,123	14.49
Steve Bator	899	11.60

=== School Trustee, French Public ===
Candidate	Vote	%
Amit Tandon	Acclaimed	

=== School Trustee, French Separate ===
Candidate	Vote	%
Nicolas Ayuen	501	56.55
Jean Wong-Chong	385	43.45
