= Bonnie Crombie =

Canadian politician (born 1960)

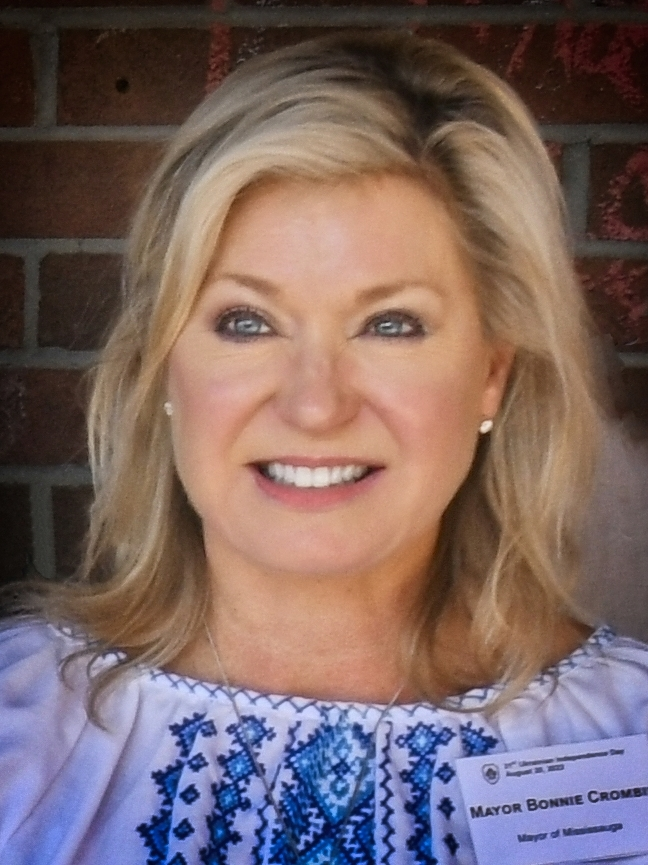
- Crombie in 2022

Leader of the Ontario Liberal Party
- In office December 2, 2023 – January 14, 2026
- Preceded by: John Fraser (interim)
- Succeeded by: John Fraser (interim)

6th Mayor of Mississauga
- In office December 1, 2014 – January 12, 2024
- Preceded by: Hazel McCallion
- Succeeded by: Carolyn Parrish

Mississauga City Councillor
- In office September 26, 2011 – December 1, 2014
- Preceded by: Eve Adams
- Succeeded by: Carolyn Parrish
- Constituency: Ward 5 (Britannia Woods-Malton)

Member of Parliament for Mississauga—Streetsville
- In office October 14, 2008 – May 2, 2011
- Preceded by: Wajid Khan
- Succeeded by: Brad Butt

Personal details
- Born: Bonnie-Michelle Teresa Bernadette Stack; February 5, 1960 (age 66) Toronto, Ontario, Canada
- Party: Ontario Liberal
- Other political affiliations: Independent (municipal); Liberal (federal)
- Spouse: Brian Crombie (m. 1984; div. 2020)
- Children: 3
- Education: University of Toronto (BA); Schulich School of Business, York University (MBA)
- Profession: Businesswoman; politician
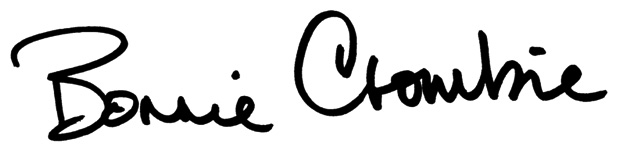
- Signature
- Website: www.bonniecrombie.ca

Bonnie-Michelle Teresa Bernadette Stack Sawarna Crombie (née Stack, formerly Sawarna; born February 5, 1960) is a Canadian politician and businesswoman who was the sixth mayor of Mississauga from 2014 to 2024 and the leader of the Ontario Liberal Party from 2023 to 2026.

Crombie was first elected as the member of Parliament (MP) for Mississauga—Streetsville from 2008 to 2011, sitting as a Liberal. From 2011 to 2014, she held the position of councillor for Ward 5 on Mississauga City Council and was a member of the Peel Regional Council. Crombie was elected as the mayor of Mississauga in the 2014 municipal election.

She ran in the 2023 leadership election of the Ontario Liberal Party as a fiscally conservative (also known as economically liberal) Blue Grit on the centre-right flank of the party, and won on the third ballot over her more left-leaning rivals. She resigned as mayor on January 12, 2024, in order to focus on her leadership of the Ontario Liberal Party, triggering the 2024 Mississauga mayoral by-election. Following a leadership review in September 2025 in which she received only 57% support, Crombie announced her resignation as leader and formally stepped down on January 14, 2026. Crombie again sought the Mississauga mayoralty in 2026, placing third behind Alvin Tedjo and incumbent mayor Carolyn Parrish.

== Background ==
Bonnie-Michelle Teresa Bernadette Stack was born on February 5, 1960, to Polish immigrants Veronica (née Sega) and Ed Stack in Toronto, Ontario. When Bonnie was three, her parents separated, and she and her mother relocated to her grandparents' large home in Toronto's High Park neighbourhood.

When Crombie was nine, her mother remarried to Michael Sawarna, who adopted Bonnie, and she took his surname, becoming Bonnie-Michelle Teresa Bernadette Stack Sawarna. The family settled in Etobicoke, where Crombie attended Michael Power/St. Joseph High School. Crombie describes her late stepfather as a “solid, hard-working, decent, honest man, and a churchgoer. We became very close. He was my father.”

In 1982, she graduated from St. Michael's College at the University of Toronto with a Bachelor of Arts in political science and international relations. Later, in 1992, she earned her Master of Business Administration from the Schulich School of Business.

Before venturing into politics, Crombie worked as a marketing manager for McDonald's Canada and the Walt Disney Company and later worked as manager of government relations for the Insurance Bureau of Canada.

She married Brian Crombie, former-CFO of Biovail Corp. and the Ottawa Senators, in 1984, with whom she has three children: Alex, Jonathan and Natasha. The couple divorced in 2020.

== Federal politics (2008–2011) ==
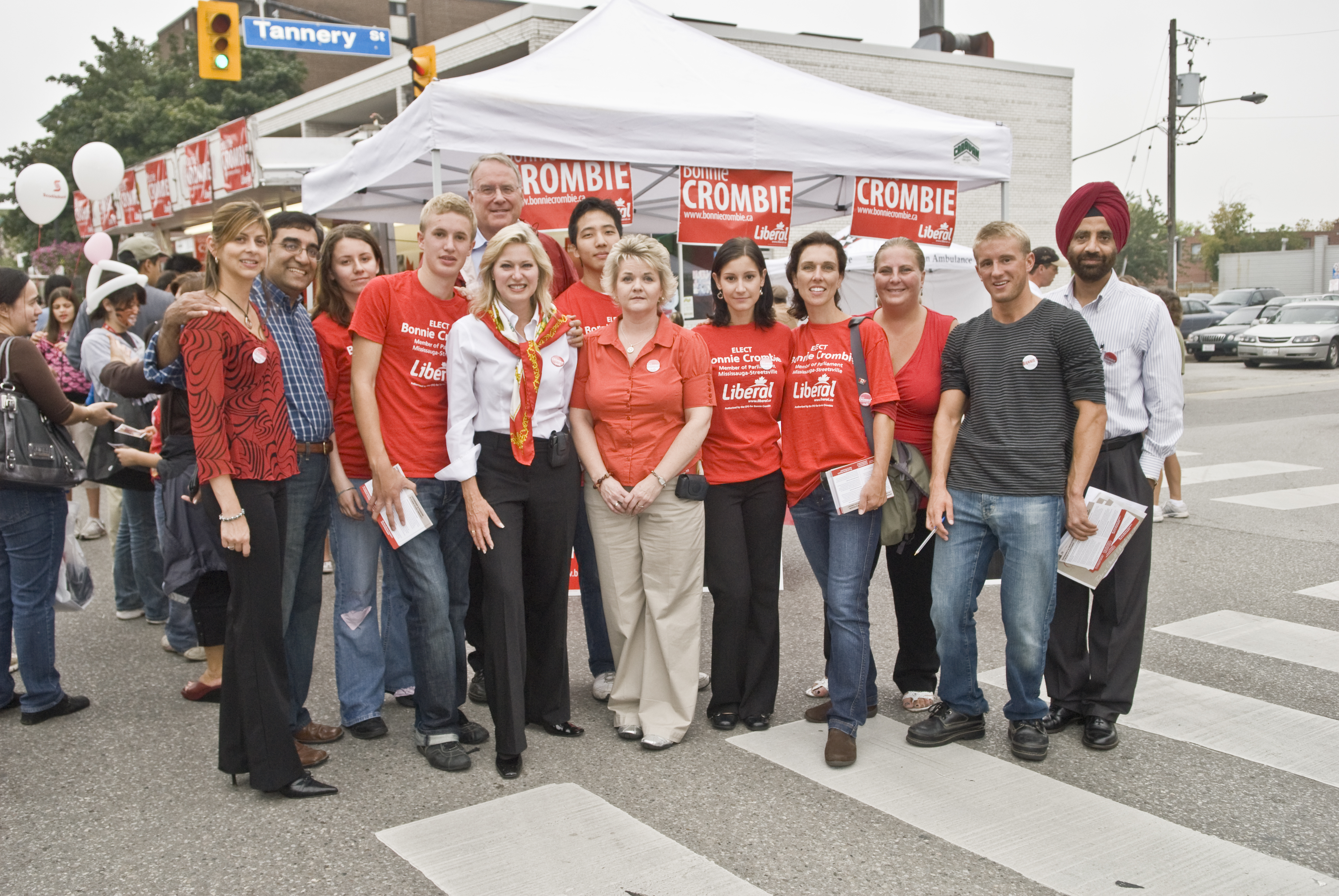
Crombie alongside members of her 2008 electoral team, September 2008

Crombie was elected as the MP for Mississauga—Streetsville in the 2008 Canadian federal election, defeating incumbent MP Wajid Khan, who had previously crossed the floor from the Liberal Party to join the Conservative Party.

Following her election, she served as co-chair of the Liberal Caucus Outreach Committee alongside Justin Trudeau and took on the role of the Liberal Party critic for Crown corporations under leader Michael Ignatieff.

In the 2011 federal election, Crombie was defeated by Conservative candidate Brad Butt; Butt received 43.8% of the vote to Crombie's 36.9%.

== Municipal politics (2011–2024, 2026) ==
On September 19, 2011, Crombie secured a seat on Mississauga City Council through a by-election, succeeding Eve Adams as councillor for Ward 5. She won by a margin of slightly over 200 votes, defeating Carolyn Parrish and Eve Adams's ex-husband, Peter. On December 12, 2012, Crombie faced charges related to alleged violations of election finance rules from her councillor run, but these charges were withdrawn in February 2013 after the Crown determined that financials needed formal auditing before any charges could be considered.

After Hazel McCallion, the long-serving mayor of Mississauga, retired, the 2014 mayoral election became the city's first genuinely competitive race in years. Crombie, along with former member of both provincial and federal parliaments Steve Mahoney and others, declared their candidacies. Despite Mahoney's narrow lead in polls for much of 2014, McCallion's endorsement of Crombie on October 12 shifted the dynamics, giving Crombie a 25-point lead over Mahoney. In the election, Crombie secured victory with 63.5 per cent of the vote.

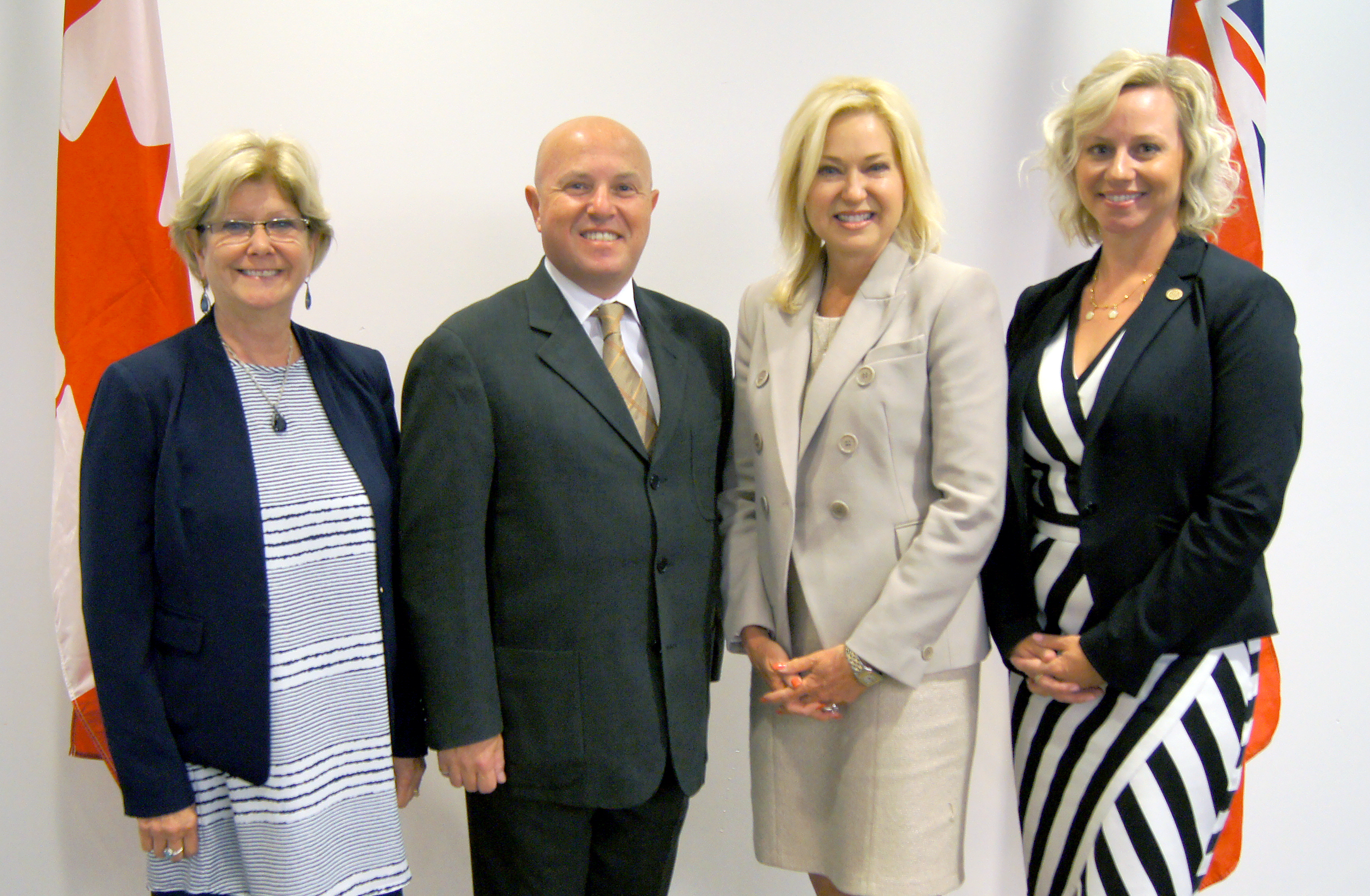
Crombie with other Mississauga representatives and Ontario MPP Peter Milczyn at the 2017 Association of Municipalities of Ontario Conference

Crombie announced her bid for re-election as mayor on October 27, 2017 and emerged victorious in the 2018 mayoral election with 77 per cent of the vote. She secured her third term in the 2022 mayoral election by another wide margin.

Throughout her mayoral tenure, Crombie advocated for the dissolution of the Region of Peel, the upper-tier municipality of which Mississauga is part. In 2023, the provincial government of Doug Ford supported the split.

During a Liberal leadership debate on The Agenda with Steve Paikin, hosted by TVO on November 15, 2023, Crombie declared that she would not seek re-election in 2026, concluding her tenure as the mayor of Mississauga after three terms. She later stated that she was likely to run for MPP in the 2025 provincial election.

After winning the 2023 leadership election of the Ontario Liberal Party, Crombie announced on December 13 that she would resign as Mississauga mayor, effective January 12, 2024, after completing the city's and Peel Region's budgets before stepping down. She was succeeded as mayor by Carolyn Parrish.

=== 2026 mayoral campaign ===
In June, Crombie announced her campaign for mayor of Mississauga in the 2026 municipal election. She placed third behind city councillor Alvin Tedjo and incumbent Carolyn Parrish.

== Provincial politics (2023–2026) ==
In early 2023, media reports, citing sources within the party, speculated that Crombie was contemplating a run in the 2023 Ontario Liberal Party leadership election scheduled for December. Her active participation was noted during the Ontario Liberal Party's annual general meeting in March 2023 and the Liberal Party of Canada's national convention in May 2023 in Ottawa.

On May 23, 2023, Crombie confirmed the speculation by announcing the formation of an exploratory committee. On June 14, she officially launched her campaign at an event in Mississauga. She took an unpaid leave of absence from her role as mayor of Mississauga starting October 7. However, she returned on November 27 to participate in the city's budget process.

Crombie was considered the front-runner in the Liberal leadership race. She ran on a pledge to make life more affordable, strengthen Ontario's healthcare system, build housing and infrastructure, improving the public education system, and fighting climate change. During the race she referred to herself a "a very centrist person", "very fiscally responsible", and "socially very progressive". She was elected party leader at the December 2, 2023, on the third ballot. She resigned as mayor on January 12, 2024. In August 2026, it was reported that the Progressive Conservative Party had sent a party official to follow Crombie while she vacationed in Jamaica shortly after her leadership victory.

Following the resignation of Parm Gill from the Ontario Legislature in January 2024, Crombie stated that she was considering running in the resulting Milton by-election, but later decided not to seek the seat.

Crombie announced on March 18, 2024, that if she became premier after the 2025 election, she would refrain from implementing a provincial carbon tax as part of her climate policy, diverging from the approach of Prime Minister Justin Trudeau and the federal Liberals. The next day, she declined to comment on a proposed federal carbon tax supported by the Liberal Party of Canada, saying "I'm not here to tell the federal government how to do their job."

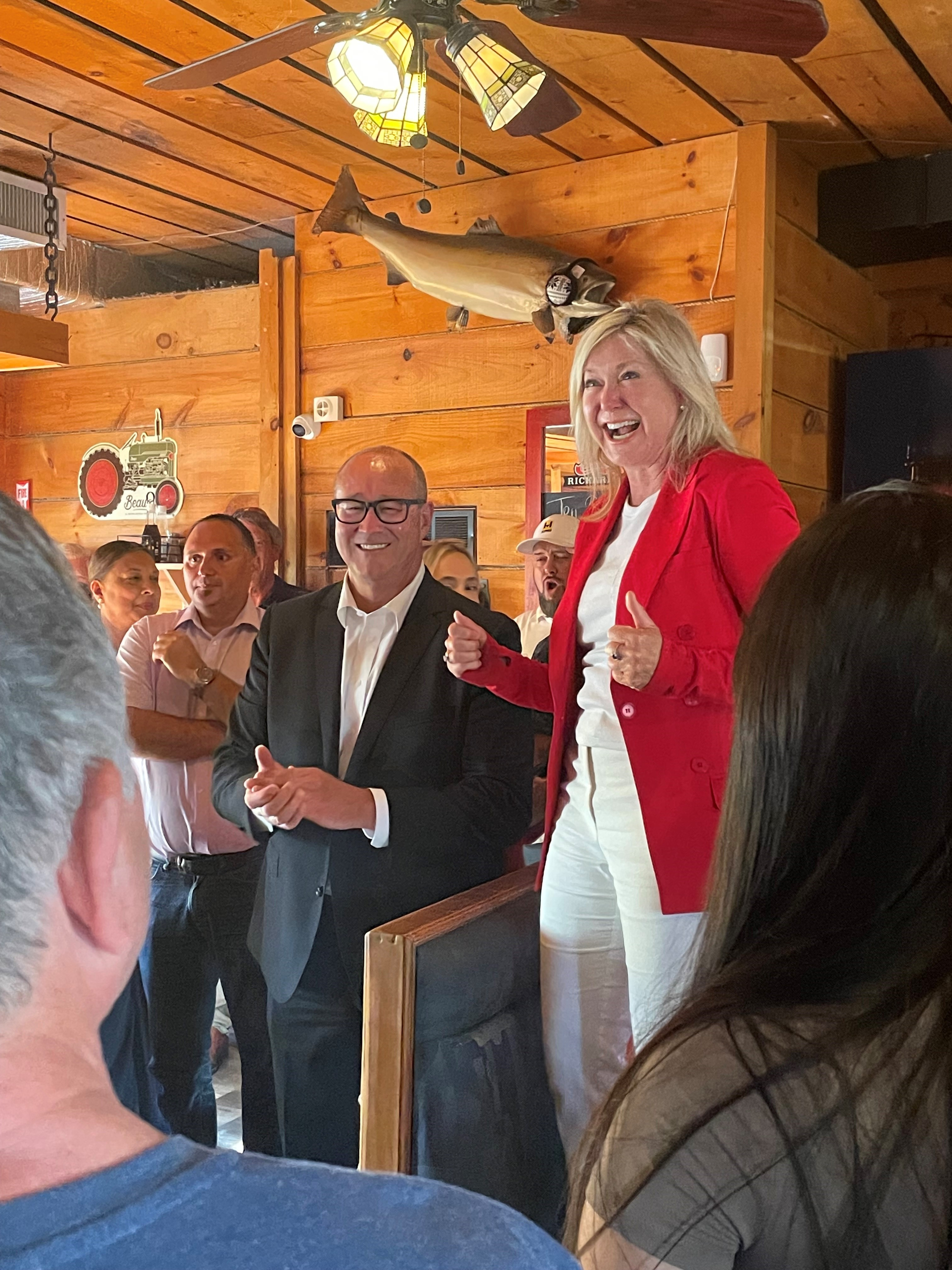
Crombie with an Ontario Liberal Party candidate for the Bay of Quinte riding, August 2024

On August 21, 2024, the Ontario Liberal Party announced their keynote speakers for their annual general meeting that included former British Columbia Premier Christy Clark and former Canadian Health Minister Jane Philpott. This move was seen by many as another attempt to distance the party and its leader from Trudeau and the federal Liberals.

On September 21, 2024, Crombie and the Ontario Liberal Party unveiled their new logo alongside their slogan, "More for You".

On December 3, 2024, Crombie criticized the federal carbon tax, describing it as "wrong."

Crombie led the Liberals to a third-place finish in the 2025 Ontario general election. While the party picked up enough seats to regain official party status for the first time since 2018, the gains were not enough to displace the Ontario NDP as official opposition. Crombie also failed to win a seat in the Ontario legislature, placing second in Mississauga East—Cooksville. Nevertheless, she vowed to continue as Liberal leader. On March 1, 2025, the Ontario Liberal Party's executive council voted unanimously in support of Bonnie Crombie remaining party leader.

Crombie received 57% support in a leadership review vote during the party's annual general meeting. This was above the 50% support required by the party's constitution, but short of the 66% many in the party had been calling for. Crombie initially announced that she would be staying on as leader, but hours after the results were announced issued a statement that she planned to resign upon the selection of a new leader. She formally resigned as leader on January 14, 2026, with Navdeep Bains elected as her successor in November.

== Electoral record ==
=== Provincial ===
2025 Ontario general election: Mississauga East—Cooksville
Party	Candidate	Votes	%	±%
Progressive Conservative	Silvia Gualtieri	16,764	46.43	+5.51
Liberal	Bonnie Crombie	15,554	43.08	+5.73
New Democratic	Alex Venuto	1,879	5.20	–5.63
Green	David Zeni	744	2.06	–1.92
New Blue	Kevin Peck	429	1.19	–3.54
Independent	Syed Hussain	223	0.62	–
Independent	Mark De Pelham	205	0.57	–
Ontario Party	Vittoria Trichilo	192	0.53	–1.32
Moderate	Oleksandra Iakovlieva	118	0.33	–0.03
Total valid votes		36,108	99.39	
Total rejected, unmarked and declined ballots		222	0.61	–0.04
Turnout		36,330	41.45	+1.87
Eligible voters		87,644		
Progressive Conservative hold		Swing		+5.62
Source: Elections Ontario

2023 Ontario Liberal Party leadership election
Candidate	1st round		2nd round				3rd round			
Candidate	Points	Votes	Points	+/−	Votes	+/−	Points	+/−	Votes	+/−
Bonnie Crombie	5,559; 42.96%	9,314; 41.07%	6,047; 46.73%	488; 3.77%	10,176; 45.40%	862; 4.33%	6,911; 53.40%	864; 6.67%	11,325; 52.35%	1,149; 6.95%
Nathaniel Erskine-Smith	3,320; 25.66%	6,083; 26.82%	3,792; 29.30%	472; 3.64%	6,944; 30.99%	861; 4.17%	6,029; 46.59%	2,237; 17.29%	10,307; 47.65%	3,363; 16.66%
Yasir Naqvi	2,760; 21.33%	4,705; 20.75%	3,101; 23.96%	341; 2.63%	5,294; 23.62%	589; 2.87%	Eliminated			
Ted Hsu	1,300; 10.05%	2,578; 11.36%	Eliminated							
Total	12,940	22,680	12,940	0	22,414	−266	12,940	0	21,632	−782

=== Municipal ===
2022 Mississauga mayoral election
Candidate	Votes	%
Bonnie Crombie (X)	82,736	78.47
David Shaw	7,202	6.83
George Tavares	5,613	5.32
Derek Ramkissoon	4,012	3.81
Mohsin Khan	2,866	2.72
Melodie J. Petty	1,464	1.39
Jayesh Trivedi	1,169	1.11
Bobie Taffe	370	0.35
Total	105,532	100.00
Source: City of Mississauga

2018 Mississauga mayoral election
Candidate	Votes	%
Bonnie Crombie (X)	91,422	76.68
Kevin J. Johnston	16,079	13.49
Scott E. W. Chapman	4,563	3.83
Andrew Lee	2,970	2.49
Mohsin Khan	1,458	1.22
Yasmin Pouragheli	996	0.84
Tiger Meng Wu	989	0.83
Syed Qumber Rizvi	752	0.63
Total	118,229	100.00
Source: City of Mississauga

2014 Mississauga mayoral election
Candidate	Votes	%
Bonnie Crombie	102,346	63.49
Steve Mahoney	46,224	28.68
Dil Muhammad	2,429	1.51
Stephen King	1,874	1.16
Masood Khan	1,254	0.78
Donald Barber	1,225	0.76
Derek Ramkissoon	1,044	0.65
Scott E. W. Chapman	868	0.54
Riazuddin Choudhry	790	0.49
Paul Fromm	775	0.48
Kevin Jackal Johnston	741	0.46
Andrew Seitz	507	0.31
Joe Lomangino	415	0.26
Grant Isaac	392	0.24
Sheraz Siddiqui	315	0.20
Total	160,678	100.00
Source: City of Mississauga

2011 Ward 5 (Mississauga) by-election
Candidate	Votes	%
Bonnie Crombie	2,479	21.54
Carolyn Parrish	2,238	19.44
Simmer Kaur	1,662	14.44
Peter Adams	1,347	11.70
Rick Williams	728	6.32
Kulvinder Bobbie Daid	633	5.50
Jake Dheer	573	4.98
Dianne Douglas	542	4.71
Mark Cashin	242	2.10
Barbara Hazel Tabuno	221	1.92
Mobeen Ali	174	1.51
Vlado Bertic	130	1.13
Glenn Barnes	58	0.50
Olive Rose Steele	57	0.50
Jimmy Ghimery	51	0.44
Sandeep Patara	51	0.44
Cheryl Rodricks	42	0.36
Frank Perrotta	40	0.35
Waqar Siddiqui	36	0.31
Jamie Dookie	35	0.30
Cecil Young	34	0.30
Mo Khan	28	0.24
Shirley Abraham	26	0.23
Grant Isaac	25	0.22
Catherine Soplet	25	0.22
Paul Keselman	17	0.15
Steve Bator	16	0.14
Total	15,816	100.00
Source: City of Mississauga

=== Federal ===
2011 Canadian federal election
Party	Candidate	Votes	%	±%	Expenditures
Conservative	Brad Butt	22,104	43.75	+7.95	–
Liberal	Bonnie Crombie	18,651	36.92	−8.84	–
New Democratic	Aijaz Naqvi	7,834	15.57	+5.65	–
Green	Christopher Hill	1,802	3.76	−2.94	–
Total valid votes/expense limit		50,391	100.00	–	
Total rejected ballots		216	0.42	−0.15	
Turnout		50,607	58.72	+2.59	
Eligible voters		86,186	–	–	

2008 Canadian federal election
Party	Candidate	Votes	%	±%	Expenditures
Liberal	Bonnie Crombie	21,710	45.76	−0.18	$79,830
Conservative	Wajid Khan	16,985	35.80	+0.99	$82,516
New Democratic	Keith Pinto	4,710	9.92	−3.39	$2,460
Green	Otto Casanova	3,179	6.70	+2.22	$11,616
Independent	Viktor Spanovic	431	0.90	NA	
Independent	Ralph Bunag	426	0.89	NA	
Total valid votes/expense limit		47,441	100.00	$89,184	
Total rejected ballots		271	0.57	+0.2	
Turnout		47,712	56.13	+8.03	

Political offices
Preceded by Hazel McCallion	Mayor of Mississauga; 2014–2024	Succeeded by Carolyn Parrish
Preceded by Eve Adams	Ward 5 Councillor, Mississauga; 2011–2014	Succeeded by Carolyn Parrish
Parliament of Canada
Preceded by Wajid Khan	Member of Parliament for Mississauga—Streetsville; 2008–2011	Succeeded by Brad Butt
