= Ward 5 (Mississauga) =

Municipal ward in Mississauga, Ontario

- Constituency for the Mississauga City Council and Peel Regional Council
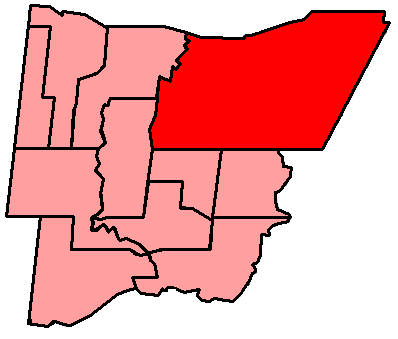
- Ward 5 within Mississauga
- Regional municipality: Peel
- City: Mississauga
- Population: About 76,000

Current constituency
- Created: 1951
- Councillor: Natalie Hart

Ward 5 is a municipal ward located in the northeast corner of the city of Mississauga, Ontario. It includes Malton and Britannia Woods, as well as extensive industrial area. Natalie Hart is the current city councillor, who was elected in the 2024 by-election to replace former councillor Carolyn Parrish who resigned to successfully run for mayor of Mississauga.

The ward contains the communities of Malton, and the part of Hurontario (the community of Britannia) north of Eglinton Avenue.

Toronto Pearson International Airport is located within the ward.

The Ward was created in 1951 when the council of Toronto Township adopted a ward system. It has covered the Malton area since its creation. Toronto Township was re-named Mississauga in 1967.

== Demographics ==
According to the 2006 Canadian census, the total population of the ward was 75,415.

The largest ethnic group in the ward is South Asians who make up 39.3% of the population (primarily East Indians). 28% of the population is White, 11.4% Black, 6.2% Chinese, 3.3% Filipino, 3.3% Southeast Asian, 1.8% Latin American, and 1.7% Arab. The ward has the highest percentage of visible minorities in the city.

English is the largest mother tongue in the ward, with 40.4% of the ward speaking it as their native language. Punjabi is spoken by 16.5% of the ward.

The median individual income of the ward is $23,141.

== Councillors ==
1. Carlton J. Stewart (1952)
2. Ian Hart (1953–1954)
3. Sid Smith (1955)
4. Thomas Sills (1956–1958)
5. Frank McKechnie (1959–1997)
6. Harold Kennedy (1997)
7. Cliff Gyles (1997–2003)
8. Eve Adams (2003–2011)
9. Bonnie Crombie (2011–2014)
10. Carolyn Parrish (2014–2024)
11. Natalie Hart (2024– )

== Election results ==
=== 2026 ===
2026 Mississauga Municipal Election, Ward 5 Councillor (unofficial)
Candidate	Popular Vote			Notes	Surveys
Candidate	Votes	%	±%	Notes	Surveys
Natalie Hart	7,331	42.36		Incumbent councillor elected in the 2024 by-election	
Aruna Anand	2,646	15.29			
Ismail Bawa	2,299	13.29			
Danny Singh	1,485	8.58			
Mandeep Singh Dhaliwal	1,364	7.88			
Michael Anthony Perretta	797	4.61			
Rosemarie Sanchez Sanchez	617	3.57		candidate for Ward 5 in the 2024 by-election	
Raghavan Babu Bhogaiah	362	2.09			
Jamie Dookie	296	1.71			
Vipan Mehta	108	0.62			
Total	17,305				

=== 2024 by-election ===
==== Candidates ====
===== Omer Abdalla =====
Candidacy registered: April 16, 2024

===== Hamid Akbar =====
Candidacy registered: March 26, 2024
Campaign website: hamidakbar.ca
Media coverage: Modern Mississauga questionnaire

===== Amir Ali =====
Previously registered as candidate for Mayor of Mississauga in the 2024 by-election. Ali tied for fourteenth place in the 2015 by-election for Ward 4 councillor, which was won by John Kovac, and received third place in the 2022 election for Ward 7 councillor, which was won by Dipika Damerla.

Candidacy registered: March 25, 2024
Campaign website: electamir.ca

===== Kristin Dattoo =====
Candidacy registered: April 15, 2024
Campaign website: votekristindattoo.com

===== Jordan Gray =====
Candidacy registered: April 5, 2024
Campaign website: jordangrayward5.ca
Media coverage: Modern Mississauga questionnaire

===== Natalie Hart =====
General manager of the Malton Business Improvement Area. Candidate for Mississauga Ward 1 councillor, 2018. Former Ontario Liberal Party regional vice-president for central west.

Candidacy registered: March 20, 2024
Campaign website: votehart.ca
Media coverage: The Pointer podcast

===== Imran Hasan =====
Former chair of the Mississauga Board of Trade, chair of Peel Crime Stoppers, and vice-president of Eden Food for Change food bank. President of telecom company Transglobal Systems of Canada. Candidate for Ward 11 in the 2018 and 2022.

Candidacy registered: March 25, 2024
Campaign website: ImranHasan.ca
Media coverage: Modern Mississauga questionnaire

===== Ehsan Khandaker =====
Candidacy registered: April 12, 2024
Campaign website: khandaker.ca
Media coverage: Modern Mississauga questionnaire

===== Tazeen Rizvi =====
Candidacy registered: April 11, 2024
Campaign website: electtazeen.com

===== Rosemarie Sanchez Sanchez =====
Candidacy registered: April 24, 2024
Campaign website: votesanchezward5.ca
Media coverage: Modern Mississauga questionnaire

===== Manish Sawhney =====
Candidacy registered: March 21, 2024
Campaign website: manishsawhney.com
Media coverage: Modern Mississauga questionnaire

===== Shelly Scott-England =====
Black Caucus Alliance chair.

Candidacy registered: March 22, 2024
Campaign website: silver-round-xcbm.squarespace.com
Media coverage: Modern Mississauga questionnaire, The Pointer podcast

===== Danny Singh =====
Candidacy registered: March 20, 2024
Campaign website: dannysingh.ca
Media coverage: Modern Mississauga questionnaire

===== Rana Zia =====
Candidacy registered: April 2, 2024

==== Polling ====
Polling firm	Source	Last date of polling	Sample Size	MoE	Hamid Akbar	Jordan Gray	Natalie Hart	Manish Sawhney	Danny Singh	Other	Undecided
Mainstreet Research	PDF	June 9, 2024	228 (IVR)	± 6.5%	5%	8%	22%	5%	20%	12%	29%

==== Results ====
Candidate	Vote	%
Natalie Hart	3,707	29.14
Danny Singh	2,993	23.53
Jordan Gray	1,326	10.42
Manish Sawhney	942	7.40
Rana Zia	942	7.40
Shelly Scott-England	616	4.84
Bradley MacDonald	421	3.81
Rosemarie Sanchez Sanchez	379	2.98
Hamid Akbar	324	2.55
Ehsan Khandaker	282	2.22
Amir Ali	260	2.04
Imran Hasan	230	1.81
Omer Abdalla	174	1.37
Kristin Dattoo	92	0.72
Tazeen Rizvi	34	0.27

=== 2022 ===
Candidate	Vote	%
Carolyn Parrish	5,631	67.79
Hamid Akbar	1,006	12.11
Domenica Laura Simone	935	11.26
Bradley MacDonald	735	8.85

=== 2018 ===
Candidate	Vote	%
Carolyn Parrish	6,798	63.87
David Broadway	1,161	10.91
Ram Pawar	1,026	9.64
Ahmad Khan	892	8.38
Marina Qureshi	452	4.25
Alex Itty	315	2.96

=== 2014 ===
Candidate	Votes	%
Carolyn Parrish	6,025	39.18
Dianne Douglas	2,762	17.96
Samantha Angel	1,938	12.60
Waseem Ahmed	1,597	10.38
Harman Singh	1,310	8.52
Crystal Mark	552	3.59
Herman Hacikyan	482	3.13
Jayesh Trivedi	385	2.50
Jas Mangat	199	1.29
Aayesha Arshad Aamir	128	0.83

=== 2011 by-election ===
Candidate	Votes	%
Bonnie Crombie	2,479	21.54
Carolyn Parrish	2,238	19.44
Simmer Kaur	1,662	14.44
Peter Adams	1,347	11.70
Rick Williams	728	6.32
Kulvinder Bobbie Daid	633	5.50
Jake Dheer	573	4.98
Dianne Douglas	542	4.71
Mark Cashin	242	2.10
Barbara Hazel Tabuno	221	1.92
Mobeen Ali	174	1.51
Vlado Bertic	130	1.13
Glenn Barnes	58	0.50
Olive Rose Steele	57	0.50
Jimmy Ghimery	51	0.44
Sandeep Patara	51	0.44
Cheryl Rodricks	42	0.36
Frank Perrotta	40	0.35
Waqar Siddiqui	36	0.31
Jamie Dookie	35	0.30
Cecil Young	34	0.30
Mo Khan	28	0.24
Shirley Abraham	26	0.23
Grant Isaac	25	0.22
Catherine Soplet	25	0.22
Paul Keselman	17	0.15
Steve Bator	16	0.14

=== 2010 ===
Candidate	Votes	%
Eve Adams	9,795	66.75
Simerjit Kaur	2,678	18.25
Ilyas Shaikh	849	5.79
Jagjit Grewal	514	3.50
David Brenn	453	3.09
Mahmood Malik	385	2.62

=== 2006 ===
Candidate	Votes	%
Eve Adams	5,704	45.77
Karman Singh Punian	2,352	18.87
Sydney Weir	1,369	10.99
Ricardo C. Francis	861	6.91
Frank Perrotta	528	4.24
Rana Ahmad	490	3.93
Sam Hanna	442	3.55
Brad MacDonald	441	3.54
Stephen Largy	203	1.63
Said M. Aldajani	71	0.57

=== 2003 ===
Two-time councillor Cliff Gyles was defeated in the election by Eve Adams; the incumbent placed a distant sixth. The election was held on November 10, roughly two months after Gyles was sentenced to 2.5 years in a federal penitentiary for accepting $35,000 in bribes.

Candidate	Votes	%
Eve Adams	3,793	30.66
Rick Falco	2,282	18.45
Roy Willis	1,089	8.80
Karam Singh Punian	1,082	8.75
Harji Bajwa	898	7.26
Cliff Gyles	572	4.62
Jim Sahdra	508	4.11
Frank Perrotta	420	3.40
Michelle Meghie	333	2.69
Nasir Majeed	294	2.38
Thomas Thomas	290	2.34
Sarbjit S. Bhatia	193	1.56
Gurjit Singh Bhatti	173	1.40
Sajjan Singh Sidhu	94	0.76
Fernando Tagalog	71	0.57
Chris Collier	70	0.57
Said M. Aldajani	67	0.54
Meena Hardatt	59	0.48
Greg Dell	34	0.27
James A. Girvin	30	0.24
Jay S. Kang	18	0.15

=== 2000 ===
Candidate	Votes	%
Cliff Gyles	6,050	52.69
Ripsodhak Singh Grewal	2,730	23.77
Roy Willis	1,945	16.94
Ranjit S. Chahal	387	3.37
Mel Kell	371	3.23

=== 1997 ===
Candidate	Votes	%
Cliff Gyles	2,458	27.85
Roy Willis	1,762	19.96
Carole Berry	1,574	17.83
Harry Singh Dhillon	1,202	13.62
Y. S. Dhaliwal	909	10.30
Colin McKechnie	864	9.79
Devinder Singh Bassi	57	0.65

=== 1994 ===
Candidate	Votes	%
Frank McKechnie	4,072	58.46
Roy Willis	1,824	26.19
Veerendra D. Adhiya	629	9.03
Howard Baker	440	6.32

=== 1991 ===
Incumbent Frank McKechnie defeats insurance broker Vijay Kalhan and warehouse worker Jasbir Singh.

Candidate	Votes	%
Frank McKechnie	3,512	55.56
Roy Willis	1,355	21.44
Vijay Kalhan	525	8.31
Howard Baker	371	5.87
James Girvin	326	5.16
Jasbir Singh Gill	232	3.67

=== 1988 ===
98% of polls reporting

Candidate	Votes	%
Frank McKechnie	4,134	70.03
Roy Willis	1,769	29.97

=== 1985 ===
Candidate	Votes	%
Frank McKechnie	2,782	41.33
Carmen DeSantis	1,441	21.41
Arthur Hoyte	1,102	16.37
Roy Willis	617	9.17
Joe Caprara	572	8.50
Bill Price	217	3.22

=== 1982 ===
Candidate	Votes	%
Frank McKechnie	4,421	53.11
Joe Genchi	2,746	32.98
Arthur Hoyte	780	9.37
Jeff Menary	378	4.54

=== 1980 ===
Real estate agent James McIntyre finished 1,100 votes behind McKechnie.

Candidate	Votes	%
Frank McKechnie	Elected	
James McIntyre		
Jhalman Gosal		
Giuseppe Genchi		
David Cox		
Cor Bal		

=== 1978 ===
Candidate	Votes	%
Frank McKechnie	3,021	60.04
James McIntyre	2,011	39.96

=== 1976 ===
Candidate	Votes	%
Frank McKechnie	Acclaimed	

=== 1973 ===
Candidate	Votes	%
Frank McKechnie	1,677	73.68
Rudie Jansen	599	26.32

=== 1970 ===
Candidate	Votes	%
Frank McKechnie	921	73.86
Rudie Jansen	326	26.14

=== 1967 ===
Candidate	Votes	%
Frank McKechnie	Elected	

=== 1965 ===
Candidate	Votes	%
Frank McKechnie	Acclaimed	

=== 1963 ===
Candidate	Votes	%
Frank McKechnie	Elected	

=== 1961 ===
Candidate	Votes	%
Frank McKechnie	Elected	
H. R. Madgett		

=== 1959 ===
Candidate	Votes	%
Frank McKechnie	Acclaimed	

=== 1958 ===
Candidate	Votes	%
Frank McKechnie	356	37.59
Harold Lanford	344	36.33
Thomas Sills	247	26.08

=== 1957 ===
Candidate	Votes	%
Thomas Sills	Acclaimed	

=== 1956 ===
Candidate	Votes	%
Thomas Sills	Acclaimed	

=== 1955 ===
Candidate	Votes	%
Thomas Sills	Acclaimed	

=== 1954 ===
Candidate	Votes	%
Sid Smith	Acclaimed	

=== 1953 (Dec.) ===
Candidate	Votes	%
Ian Hart	419	57.24
Clayton Cheyne	313	42.76

=== 1953 (Jan.) ===
Candidate	Votes	%
Ian Hart	454	59.19
Clayton Cheyne	313	40.81

=== 1951 ===
Candidate	Votes	%
Carlton J. Stewart	Acclaimed	
