= Gagan Sikand =

Canadian politician (born 1984)

Member of Parliament for Mississauga—Streetsville
- In office October 19, 2015 – September 19, 2021
- Preceded by: Brad Butt
- Succeeded by: Rechie Valdez

Personal details
- Born: November 21, 1984 (age 41) Toronto, Ontario, Canada
- Party: Liberal
- Education: University of Toronto; Brunel Law School
- Profession: Lawyer, businessman, politician

Gagan Sikand is a Canadian politician who served as Member of Parliament (MP) for the Greater Toronto Area riding of Mississauga—Streetsville from 2015 to 2021. He served as a member of the Liberal Party.

== Background ==
Sikand attended the Mississauga campus of the University of Toronto. He completed an Honours B.A. with a double major in crime and deviance and philosophy with a minor in anthropology. He obtained an LLB Law degree from Brunel Law School in London, England. He worked for the provincial office of the Attorney General and Ministry of Aboriginal Affairs. Born in Toronto, he has lived in Mississauga for over 30 years and in the riding of Mississauga-Streetsville for 29 years.

== Politics ==
In the 2015 federal election, Sikand ran as the Liberal candidate in the riding of Mississauga—Streetsville. He defeated Conservative incumbent Brad Butt by 4,171 votes. He was a backbench supporter of the government of Prime Minister Justin Trudeau. He sat on the Standing Committee on Transport, Infrastructure and Communities and Standing Joint Committee on the Library of Parliament. On April 18, 2018 he was named Co-Chair of the Standing Joint Committee on the Library of Parliament.

On February 26, 2016, he introduced a Private Member's Bill that would allow police to use a device that could detect the presence of alcohol for a car driver without having to administer a breathalyzer test. As of September 21, 2016, the bill has passed first reading and is being consider by the house.

On June 13, 2016 he was named Caucus Liaison for the Ontario Young Liberals.

In 2017, Sikand abstained during the vote for Motion 103 to condemn Islamophobia. All other Liberal MPs present voted in favor of the motion.

On October 20, 2020, Sikand took a medical leave of absence from Parliament, the leave was approved by the Chief Government Whip.

On August 15, 2021, Sikand announced that he would not be seeking re-election in the next election.

== Electoral record ==
2019 Canadian federal election: Mississauga—Streetsville
Party	Candidate	Votes	%	±%	Expenditures
Liberal	Gagan Sikand	29,618	50.4	+2.56	$84,567.48
Conservative	Ghada Melek	19,474	33.1	-7.3	$69,794.85
New Democratic	Samir Girguis	6,036	10.3	+1.3	$12,072.67
Green	Chris Hill	2,688	4.6	+2.29	$1,396.80
People's	Thomas McIver	706	1.2		$0.00
Animal Protection	Natalie Spizzirri	243	0.4		$1,762.35
Total valid votes/expense limit		58,765	100.0		
Total rejected ballots		437			
Turnout		59,202	67.6		
Eligible voters		87,557			
Liberal hold		Swing		+4.93	
Source: Elections Canada

2015 Canadian federal election
Party	Candidate	Votes	%	±%	Expenditures
Liberal	Gagan Sikand	26,792	47.8	+12.81	–
Conservative	Brad Butt	22,621	40.4	-5.72	–
New Democratic	Fayaz Karim	5,040	9.0	-6.0	–
Green	Chris Hill	1,293	2.3	-1.36	–
Christian Heritage	Yegor Tarazevich	253	0.5	–	–
Total valid votes/Expense limit		55,999	100.0		$219,652.47
Total rejected ballots		217	–	–	
Turnout		56,216	67.6%	–	
Eligible voters		83,122			
Liberal gain from Conservative		Swing		+9.26%	
Source: Elections Canada
