= Brad Butt =

Canadian politician

Mississauga City Councillor
- Incumbent
- Assumed office November, 2022
- Preceded by: George Carlson
- Constituency: Ward 11 (Streetsville)

Member of Parliament for Mississauga—Streetsville
- In office May 30, 2011 – August 4, 2015
- Preceded by: Bonnie Crombie
- Succeeded by: Gagan Sikand

Personal details
- Born: May 10, 1967 (age 59) Ottawa, Ontario, Canada
- Party: Conservative

Brad Butt (born May 10, 1967) is a Canadian politician who served as Member of Parliament (MP) for the Greater Toronto Area riding of Mississauga—Streetsville from 2011 to 2015. He served as a member of the Conservative party.

He represented the electoral district of Mississauga—Streetsville as a member of the Conservative Party until his defeat in the 2015 election. Before winning his seat in 2011, Butt had been a political commentator on Mississauga Cable 10 for many years, and president & CEO of the Greater Toronto Apartment Association since May 1999.

== Early life ==
Butt is the son of the late Terry Butt, property developer and Ward 7 city councillor for Mississauga City Council.

== Early Political Career ==
Butt first ran for public office in Mississauga Ward 7 city council in the 1988 municipal election and later in 1991 in Ward 1. Butt also ran for the Progressive Conservative Party of Ontario in the 1990 election in the provincial riding of Mississauga East.

Butt ran for the Canadian Alliance in the 2000 election in the federal riding of Mississauga South.

== Member of Parliament ==
Butt provoked controversy in 2012 for making a 'finger gun' gesture at Bob Rae, then leader of the Liberal Party of Canada, pretending to shoot him in the House of Commons.

On February 6, 2014, Butt claimed during a parliamentary debate about a proposed bill on election reform that he witnessed people taking discard voter cards from the garbage and then handing them to other people outside voting stations to be used as identification. On February 24, he retracted the statement and admitted that he had made up the story. He said, "I misspoke during debate and corrected the record." He said that what actually happened was that he was relating stories that he had heard during his time as president with the Greater Toronto Apartment Association. "I did not see it personally and only said it in the House, not committee," Butt said. "I made a mistake."

In the 2015 election, Butt lost to Liberal candidate Gagan Sikand. Butt made headlines during the election when he raised the example of New Democratic Party leader Tom Mulcair, a dual citizen of Canada and France, as a hypothetical candidate for deportation if he was convicted of treason under the Conservatives' new citizenship bill, C-24.

== Later political career ==
Butt registered to run as a candidate for Ward 1 city councillor for Mississauga City Council in the 2018 Peel Region municipal election, and has recently served as the director of government relations for the Mississauga Board of Trade. He was elected to city council in 2022.
