= Mississauga—Streetsville (federal electoral district) =

Federal electoral district in Ontario, Canada

Coordinates: 43.6°N 79.7°W

Ontario electoral district
- Interactive map of riding boundaries from the 2025 federal election

Federal electoral district
- Legislature: House of Commons
MP
Rechie Valdez
Liberal
- District created: 2003
- First contested: 2004
- Last contested: 2025
- District webpage: profile, map

Demographics
- Population (2011): 118,757
- Electors (2015): 82,618
- Area (km²): 49
- Pop. density (per km²): 2,423.6
- Census division: Peel
- Census subdivision: Mississauga

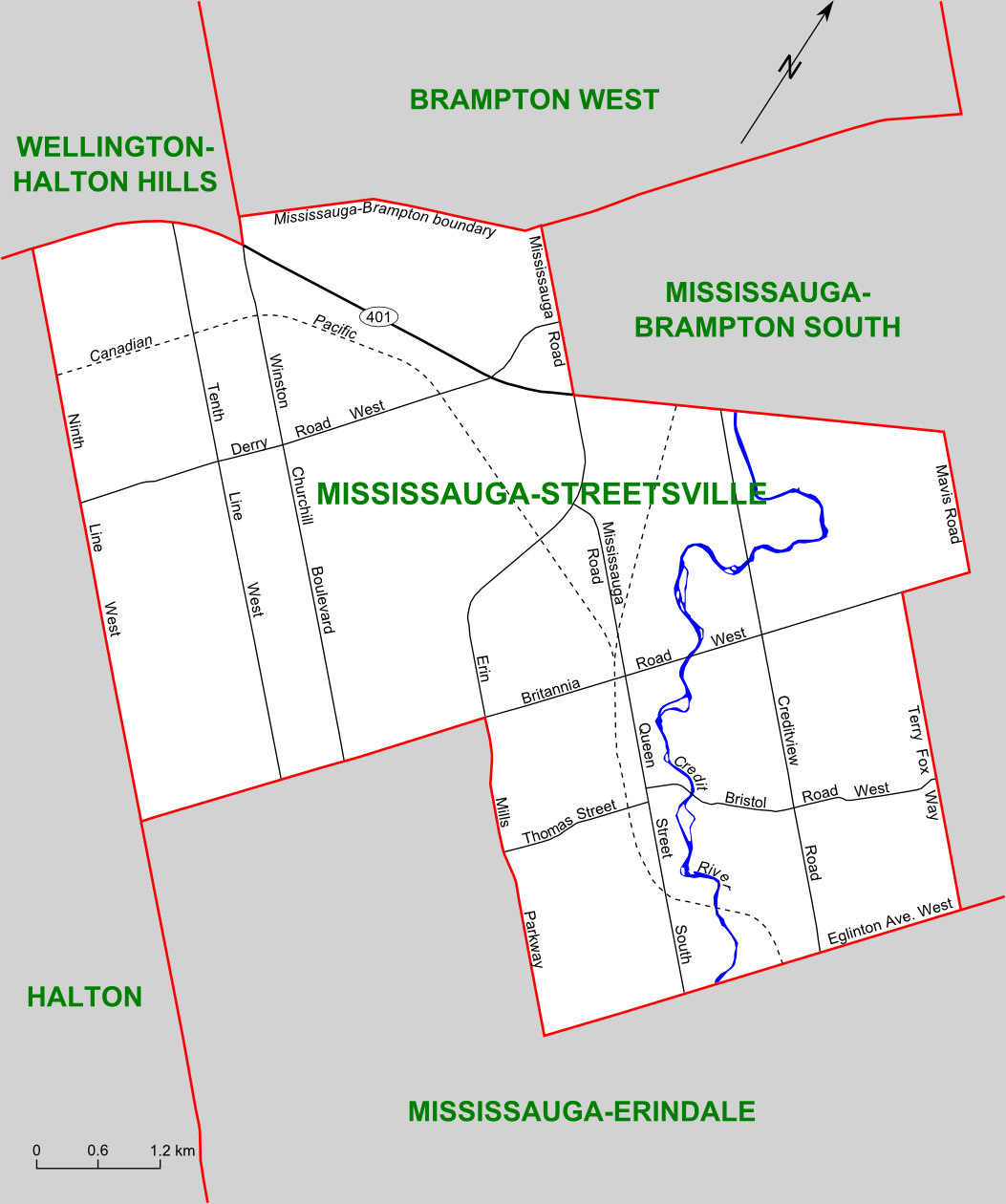
Map of Mississauga-Streetsville

Mississauga—Streetsville is a federal electoral district in Ontario, Canada, that has been represented in the House of Commons of Canada since 2004. This riding is centred on the villages of Streetsville and Meadowvale.

Mississauga—Streetsville is one of the most affluent ridings in Ontario, along with Mississauga—Erin Mills and Mississauga—Lakeshore.

== Demographics ==
According to the 2021 Canadian census

Ethnic groups: 40.1% White, 25.3% South Asian, 6.4% Black, 6.3% Chinese, 5.5% Arab, 5.2% Filipino, 3.0% Latin American, 1.8% Southeast Asian
Languages: 51.7% English, 5.1% Urdu, 3.8% Arabic, 2.6% Spanish, 2.5% Mandarin, 2.4% Tagalog, 2.2% Polish, 2.1% Punjabi, 1.8% Portuguese, 1.8% Cantonese, 1.6% Hindi, 1.3% Tamil, 1.1% French, 1.1% Italian, 1.0% Vietnamese
Religions: 53.6% Christian (32.7% Catholic, 3.5% Christian Orthodox, 2.6% Anglican, 1.9% United Church, 1.3% Pentecostal, 1.0% Presbyterian, 10.6% other), 15.3% Muslim, 8.8% Hindu, 2.5% Sikh, 1.6% Buddhist, 17.5% no religion
Median income: $43,600 (2020)
Average income: $57,000 (2020)

== Riding history ==
It was created in 2003 from parts of Brampton West—Mississauga and Mississauga West ridings.

It consists of the part of the City of Mississauga bounded by a line drawn from the northwestern city limit southeast along Mississauga Road, northeast along Highway 401, southeast along Mavis Road, southwest along Britannia Road West, southeast along Terry Fox Way, southwest along Eglinton Avenue West, northwest along Erin Mills Parkway, southwest along Britannia Road West to the southwestern city limit.

This riding lost territory to Mississauga—Malton and Mississauga Centre, and gained territory from Mississauga—Brampton South and a fraction from Halton during the 2012 electoral redistribution.

=== Members of Parliament ===
This riding has elected the following members of Parliament:

Parliament	Years	Member	Party
Mississauga—Streetsville; Riding created from Brampton West—Mississauga and Mississauga West
38th	2004–2006	Wajid Khan	Liberal
39th	2006–2007	Wajid Khan	Liberal
39th	2007–2007	Wajid Khan	Conservative
39th	2007–2008	Wajid Khan	Independent
39th	2008–2008	Wajid Khan	Conservative
40th	2008–2011	Bonnie Crombie	Liberal
41st	2011–2015	Brad Butt	Conservative
42nd	2015–2019	Gagan Sikand	Liberal
43rd	2019–2021	Gagan Sikand	Liberal
44th	2021–2025	Rechie Valdez	Liberal
45th	2025–present	Rechie Valdez	Liberal

== Election results ==
View source data.
Graph of election results in Etobicoke—Lakeshore (parties that never received 2% of the vote are omitted)

2025 Canadian federal election
Party	Candidate	Votes	%	±%	Expenditures
Liberal	Rechie Valdez	31,297	51.53	+4.19	$127,819.60
Conservative	Sue McFadden	27,241	44.86	+10.54	$123,776.86
New Democratic	Bushra Asghar	1,388	2.29	–9.80	$24,415.43
Green	Chris Hill	439	0.72	–1.41	$0.00
People's	Logan Araujo	366	0.60	–3.13	$0.00
Total valid votes/expense limit		61,025	99.52	–	$132,569.46
Total rejected ballots		294	0.48		
Turnout		61,319	70.34		
Eligible voters		87,180			
Liberal notional hold		Swing		–3.17	
Source: Elections Canada

2021 federal election redistributed results
Party	Vote	%
Liberal	23,343	47.34
Conservative	16,921	34.32
New Democratic	5,963	12.09
People's	1,840	3.73
Green	1,048	2.13
Others	194	0.39

2021 Canadian federal election
Party	Candidate	Votes	%	±%	Expenditures
Liberal	Rechie Valdez	23,698	47.3	-3.1	$57,311.79
Conservative	Jasveen Rattan	17,131	34.2	+1.1	$62,172.94
New Democratic	Farina Hassan	6,186	12.3	+2.0	$3,193.29
People's	Gurdeep Wolosz	1,851	3.7	+2.5	$2,365.54
Green	Chris Hill	1,048	2.1	-2.5	$298.25
Animal Protection	Natalie Spizzirri	210	0.4	±0.0	$2,470.94
Total valid votes/expense limit		50,124	99.3	–	$115,206.97
Total rejected ballots		333	0.7		
Turnout		50,457	58.7		
Eligible voters		85,976			
Liberal hold		Swing		-2.1	
Source: Elections Canada

2019 Canadian federal election
Party	Candidate	Votes	%	±%	Expenditures
Liberal	Gagan Sikand	29,618	50.4	+2.56	$84,567.48
Conservative	Ghada Melek	19,474	33.1	-7.3	$69,794.85
New Democratic	Samir Girguis	6,036	10.3	+1.3	$12,072.67
Green	Chris Hill	2,688	4.6	+2.29	$1,396.80
People's	Thomas McIver	706	1.2		$0.00
Animal Protection	Natalie Spizzirri	243	0.4		$1,762.35
Total valid votes/expense limit		58,765	100.0		
Total rejected ballots		437			
Turnout		59,202	67.6		
Eligible voters		87,557			
Liberal hold		Swing		+4.93	
Source: Elections Canada

2015 Canadian federal election
Party	Candidate	Votes	%	±%	Expenditures
Liberal	Gagan Sikand	26,792	47.84	+12.85	–
Conservative	Brad Butt	22,621	40.40	-5.72	–
New Democratic	Fayaz Karim	5,040	9.00	-6.21	–
Green	Chris Hill	1,293	2.31	-1.35	–
Christian Heritage	Yegor Tarazevich	253	0.45	–	–
Total valid votes/expense limit		55,999	100.00		$219,652.47
Total rejected ballots		217	0.39	–	
Turnout		56,216	67.63	–	
Eligible voters		83,122			
Liberal gain from Conservative		Swing		+9.29	
Source: Elections Canada

2011 federal election redistributed results
Party	Vote	%
Conservative	21,324	46.12
Liberal	16,179	34.99
New Democratic	7,033	15.21
Green	1,691	3.66
Others	10	0.02

2011 Canadian federal election
Party	Candidate	Votes	%	±%	Expenditures
Conservative	Brad Butt	22,104	43.75	+7.95	–
Liberal	Bonnie Crombie	18,651	36.92	-8.84	–
New Democratic	Aijaz Naqvi	7,834	15.57	+5.65	–
Green	Christopher Hill	1,802	3.76	-2.94	–
Total valid votes/expense limit		50,391	100.00	–	
Total rejected ballots		216	0.42	-0.15	
Turnout		50,607	58.72	+2.59	
Eligible voters		86,186	–	–	

2008 Canadian federal election
Party	Candidate	Votes	%	±%	Expenditures
Liberal	Bonnie Crombie	21,710	45.76	-0.18	$79,830
Conservative	Wajid Khan	16,985	35.80	+0.99	$82,516
New Democratic	Keith Pinto	4,710	9.92	-3.39	$2,460
Green	Otto Casanova	3,179	6.70	+2.22	$11,616
Independent	Viktor Spanovic	431	0.90	NA	
Independent	Ralph Bunag	426	0.89	NA	
Total valid votes/expense limit		47,441	100.00	$89,184	
Total rejected ballots		271	0.57	+0.2	
Turnout		47,712	56.13	+8.03	

2006 Canadian federal election
Party	Candidate	Votes	%	±%	Expenditures
Liberal	Wajid Khan	23,913	45.94	-4.7	
Conservative	Raminder Gill	18,121	34.81	+3.1	
New Democratic	James Caron	6,929	13.31	+3.8	
Green	Otto Casanova	2,334	4.48	-0.9	
Progressive Canadian	Peter Gibson Creighton	747	1.43	-1.5	
Total valid votes/expense limit		52,044	100.0		
Total rejected ballots		205	0.4	-0.2	
Turnout		52,249	64.16	+6.9	

2004 Canadian federal election
Party	Candidate	Votes	%	±%	Expenditures
Liberal	Wajid Khan	22,768	50.6	NA	$75,888
Conservative	Nina Tangri	14,287	31.7	NA	$77,315
New Democratic	Manjinder Rai	4,266	9.5	NA	$3,358
Green	Otto Casanova	2,415	5.4	NA	$0
Progressive Canadian	Peter Gibson Creighton	1,293	2.9	NA	$4,420
Total valid votes/Expense limit		45,029	100.0	$160,981	
Total rejected ballots		260	0.6		
Turnout		45,289	57.9		

== See also ==
- List of Canadian electoral districts
- Historical federal electoral districts of Canada
