= Eve Adams =

Canadian politician (born 1974)

Member of the House of Commons of Canada for Mississauga—Brampton South
- In office May 2, 2011 – August 4, 2015
- Preceded by: Navdeep Bains
- Succeeded by: Riding abolished

Mississauga City Councillor
- In office 2003–2011
- Preceded by: Cliff Gyles
- Succeeded by: Bonnie Crombie
- Constituency: Ward 5 (Brittania Woods, Malton)

Personal details
- Born: Eve Horvat; November 7, 1974 (age 52) Sudbury, Ontario, Canada
- Party: Liberal (2015)
- Other political affiliations: Conservative (2011-2015)
- Children: 1
- Education: University of Western Ontario University of Ottawa
- Profession: Accountant
- Website: http://www.eveadams.ca

Eve Adams (née Horvat; born November 7, 1974) is a Canadian politician who served as the Member of Parliament for the federal electoral district of Mississauga—Brampton South from 2011 to 2015. She was elected as a member of the Conservative Party of Canada but, on February 9, 2015, resigned as a parliamentary secretary and crossed the floor to join the Liberal Party. Adams later lost the Liberal nomination in Eglinton—Lawrence to Marco Mendicino.

Adams unsuccessfully ran as a candidate for Ward 8 on Hamilton City Council in the 2018 municipal election.

== Background ==
The daughter of Hungarian immigrants, Adams was born in Sudbury, raised in Hamilton and lived in Mississauga.

Adams won a scholarship to serve as a parliamentary page as part of a national program to improve Canadians' understanding of Parliament. She then worked as an aide to Michael Wilson when he was a minister in Prime Minister Brian Mulroney's cabinet.

Before graduating from the University of Western Ontario, Adams went to work at Queen's Park for eight years in the Ministry of Transportation, Ministry of Citizenship, and Ministry of Energy, Science and Technology as a senior policy and political advisor.

== Political career ==
Adams won her first election campaign in the 2003 Mississauga City Council municipal election. This victory made her the youngest representative elected to that body. After winning three successful municipal elections and serving seven years as a city and regional councillor in Mississauga, Adams entered federal politics. Adams won the federal riding of Mississauga-Brampton South in the 2011 election, defeating incumbent Liberal Navdeep Bains by over 5,000 votes. The Toronto Star noted that both the Adams and Bains campaigns were particularly respectful and issue-focused, suggesting that they were role models for a better kind of politics.

Following the election, in May 2011, Prime Minister Stephen Harper appointed Adams as Parliamentary Secretary to the Minister of Veterans Affairs. Adams led the Hire-a-Veteran initiative to encourage employers across Canada to offer priority hiring to veterans. Adams launched the initiative with Intuit Canada, Toronto's Hospital for Sick Children, Queen's University, 3M and Cenovus Energy. In August 2013, Adams was appointed parliamentary secretary for Health. There was speculation that Adams would seek the mayoralty in Mississauga in November 2014. Eve Adams was the first MP to welcome the Duke and Duchess of Cambridge during their first Royal Tour.

On February 9, 2015, as a Parliamentary Secretary, Adams crossed the floor to join the Liberal Party caucus. Adams sought the Liberal nomination in Eglinton—Lawrence but was defeated at the July 26, 2015 nomination meeting by Marco Mendicino, who received approximately 1,100 votes to 800 votes for Adams. Mendicino had been campaigning in the riding for over two years.

== Controversies ==
In the 2011 federal election campaign, Adams claimed $2,777 (equivalent to $3,806 in 2025) in personal expenses, including $1,750 (equivalent to $2,399 in 2025) for childcare for her 5-year-old son. Adams worked full-time while campaigning. Her salon visits and dry-cleaning costs were capped at $200 (equivalent to $274 in 2025). Adams' official agent at the time stated he would repay $6,003.34 (equivalent to $8,228 in 2025) in expenses, which he personally withdrew, before completing the Elections Canada filing. Elections Canada accepted and approved the filing.

From 2014, Adams was embroiled in a controversy over her attempt to secure the Conservative nomination for Oakville North-Burlington with the help of her partner Dimitri Soudas, then the Director of Communications to Canadian Prime Minister Stephen Harper, even though Soudas was prohibited from doing so. The scandal led to Soudas's dismissal and Adams's crossing of the floor in 2015.

After Adams crossed to the Liberals, the CPC claims they notified Adams that she would not be allowed to run in the upcoming federal election. However, Adams was still answering questions in the House of Commons for the Prime Minister until she crossed the floor. Parliamentary Secretaries are personally appointed by the Prime Minister with a $16,500 pay raise. The PM shuffled Parliamentary Secretaries twice after Adams withdrew and did not demote her. Almost 100 Members of Parliament (MP) were not elevated from the backbench as was Adams.

Adams became involved in a nomination battle, in 2014, in the new Oakville North—Burlington riding, after her existing riding was split. Both Adams and her rival withdrew their candidacies.

== Boards ==
Adams has been appointed to a number of varied Boards: Enersource Corporation (Mississauga's municipal electricity distributor), Living Arts Centre, Toronto and Region Conservation Authority, Credit Valley Conservation, Peel Living Corporation (regional public housing authority, and she was a founding Director of Partners in Project Green (a corporate, environmental agency).

== Charitable work and honours ==
Adams has served on Red Cross Boards in Toronto and Mississauga for over 14 years. She organized or participated in over 17 Terry Fox Runs and was honoured to assist Terry Fox's brother, Darrell Fox with the Tour of Hope.

Adams was named Honorary Chair of the Malton Festival; Mississauga Multiple Sclerosis Walkathon; and the Malton Environmental Stewardship Program. She was also appointed an ex-officio Director of Malton Neighbourhood Services.

Eve Adams received the Queen Elizabeth II Diamond Jubilee Medal in 2012.

== Personal life ==
Eve Adams is divorced and has one son who was born in 2005. Her ex-husband, Peter Adams, a former assistant to Michael Wilson, ran and lost in the by-election to take her place on the Mississauga City Council after she entered federal politics in 2011.

Adams was engaged for a time to Canadian Prime Minister Stephen Harper’s former Director of Communications, Dimitri Soudas.

== Electoral record ==
=== Federal ===
2011 Canadian federal election: Mississauga—Brampton South
| Party | Candidate | Votes | % | ±% | Expenditures |
|---|---|---|---|---|---|
| Conservative | Eve Adams | 23,632 | 44.72 | +11.76 | $ 90,006.33 |
| Liberal | Navdeep Bains | 18,579 | 35.16 | −12.53 | 75,658.79 |
| New Democratic | Jim Glavan | 9,465 | 17.91 | +6.07 | |
| Green | Benjamin Stone | 1,044 | 1.98 | −4.64 | 16.14 |
| Marxist–Leninist | Tim Sullivan | 127 | 0.24 | −0.65 | |
| Total valid votes/expense limit | | 52,847 | 100.0 | +18.77 | $ 96,095.05 |
| Total rejected ballots | | 351 | 0.66 | −0.10 | |
| Turnout | | 53,198 | 56.28 | +6.89 | |
| Eligible voters | | 94,531 | | +4.14 | |
Source(s) "Official Voting Results – Forty-First General Election 2011 — Table 12 – List of candidates by electoral district and individual results". Elections Canada. May 2, 2011. "Financial Reports: Candidate's Electoral Campaign Return". May 2, 2011.

=== Municipal ===
2018 Hamilton Municipal Election: Ward 8
| Candidate | Votes | % |
| John-Paul Danko | 3,752 | 41.67 |
| Eve Adams | 2,097 | 23.29 |
| Steve Ruddick | 1,095 | 21.16 |
| 3 other candidates | 1,249 | 13.88 |
| Total | 8,193 | 100.00 |

2010 Mississauga Municipal Election: Ward 5
| Candidate | Votes | % |
| Eve Adams | 9,795 | 66.75 |
| Simerjit Kaur | 2,678 | 18.25 |
| 4 other candidates | 2,201 | 15.00 |
| Total | 14,674 | 100.00 |

2006 Mississauga Municipal Election: Ward 5
| Candidate | Votes | % |
| Eve Adams | 5,704 | 45.77 |
| Karman Singh Punian | 2,352 | 18.87 |
| Sydney Weir | 1,369 | 10.99 |
| 7 other candidates | 3,036 | 24.37 |
| Total | 12,461 | 100.00 |

2003 Mississauga Municipal Election: Ward 5
| Candidate | Votes | % |
| Eve Adams | 3,793 | 30.66 |
| Rick Falco | 2,282 | 18.75 |
| 19 other candidates | 6,295 | 50.59 |
| Total | 12,370 | 100.00 |
