= 2026 Mississauga municipal election =

Municipal election in Ontario, Canada

- October 26, 2026

Mayor & 11 City Councillors
- Mayoral election
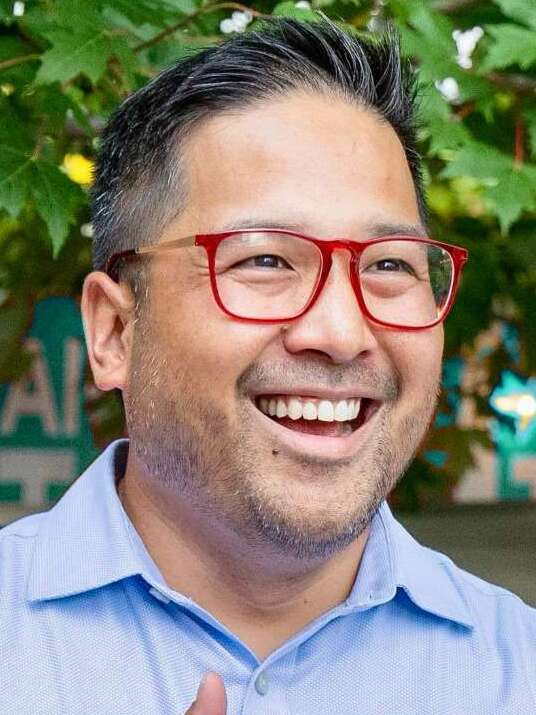

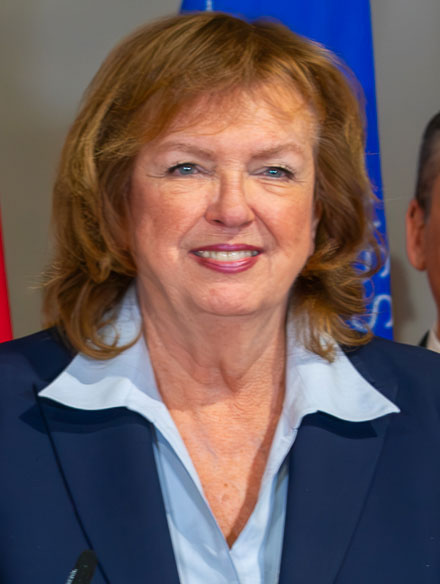

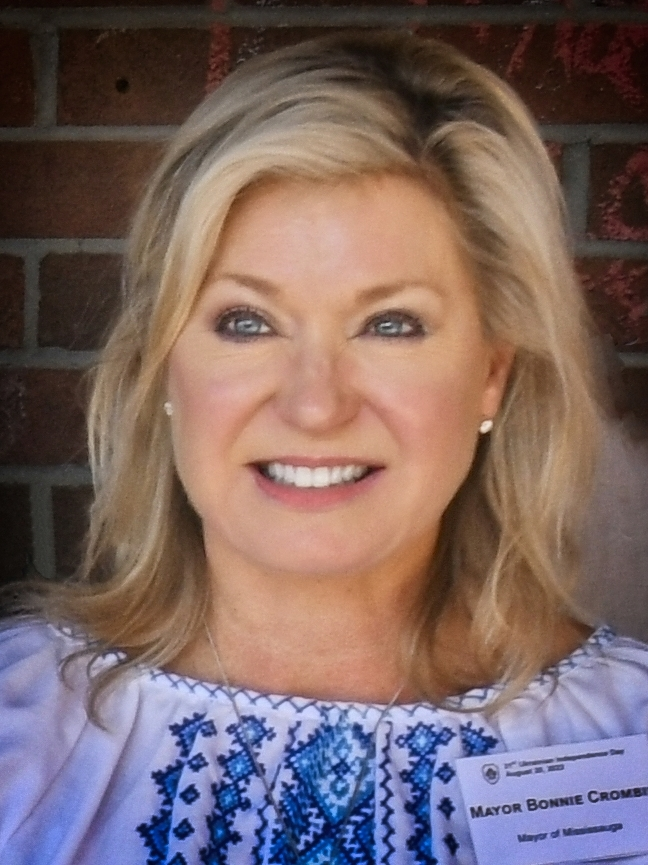

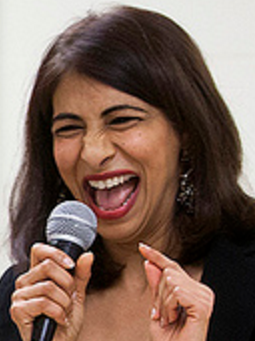
Candidate	Alvin Tedjo	Carolyn Parrish
Popular vote	74,479	51,853
Percentage	39.21%	27.30%
Candidate	Bonnie Crombie	Dipika Damerla
Popular vote	43,191	11,500
Percentage	22.74%	6.05%
Mayor before election
Carolyn Parrish
Elected Mayor
Alvin Tedjo

The 2026 Mississauga municipal election was held in Mississauga, Ontario on October 26, 2026, when municipal elections took place throughout the province of Ontario, Canada. The election determined the makeup of Mississauga City Council, which consists of the mayor and eleven councillors for a four-year term. Alvin Tedjo, rookie councillor for Ward 2 and runner-up in the 2024 mayoral by-election, secured an upset victory against in a competitive three-way contest, defeating his two immediate predecessors, incumbent Carolyn Parrish and former mayor Bonnie Crombie. The city also returned nine of its eleven incumbent councillors all with comfortable margins, and saw competitive council race only in the two wards left open by mayoral contenders.

The mayoral contest, featuring four serious candidates all with partisan Liberal background, was the city's first competitive multi-way contest during a regularly scheduled election in recent memory. The race was initially billed as a contest between two high-profile contenders with a documented history of rivalry, the incumbent mayor Carolyn Parrish and former mayor Bonnie Crombie. The two frontrunners were both former federal MPs with prominence well beyond the city border. Their prominence combined with the unique nature of a recent occupant challenging a recently elected incumbent helped attracted substantial higher than usual regional media coverage. Ward 2 councillor Alvin Tedjo, runner-up in the 2024 mayoral by-election, emerged as a credible contender in the final month of the campaign, and ultimately secured an upset victory against his two immediate predecessors and became the first person to oust an incumbent mayor in Mississauga since Hazel McCallion ousted Ron Searle in 1978.

The twelve victors would also serve on the Peel Regional Council ex officio, making up just shy of half of the council. Voters also elected six trustees to the Peel District School Board, seven trustees to the Dufferin-Peel Catholic District School Board, and one trustee to each of Conseil scolaire Viamonde and Conseil scolaire catholique MonAvenir.

== Mayoral election ==
=== Background ===
Having ousted incumbent mayors in the city's first three elections (held respectively in 1973, 1976 and 1978), Mississauga had consistently handed its chain of office to its long-time mayor Hazel McCallion and her chosen successor Bonnie Crombie with comfortable margins. While the 2014 contest upon McCallion's retirement, the city's first open mayoral race, was viewed as competitive throughout the campaign, Crombie secured McCallion's endorsement two weeks before election days and won a decisive two-to-one victory over fellow incumbent councillor Steve Mahoney, a former federal minister and provincial MPP.

After three comfortable mayoral wins, Crombie announced in May 2023 that she had formed an exploratory committee for the leadership of the Ontario Liberal Party. The decision was made public days after the announcement of the dissolution of Peel Region. Multiple councillors publicly questioned her ability to govern the city during the process. Crombie took a leave of absence and entered the race, and won the 2023 Ontario Liberal Party leadership election in December that year. Her resignation of the mayoralty following her leadership victory triggered the 2024 mayoral by-election, Mississauga second's open mayoral race and its first genuinely competitive, multi-way mayoral contest in over four decades.

The by-election offered a rare opportunity for sitting councillors to launch a mayoral bid without relinquishing their seat on council. Four sitting councillors – Dipika Damerla, Stephen Dasko, Carolyn Parrish and Alvin Tedjo – entered the race, together secured over 90% of the votes. Parrish, a long-time rival of Crombie, was the most senior of the four candidates, having served on council for close to a decade and held other elected offices for another two decades. She was also the only candidate among the four councillors to resigned her seat to enter the contest, triggering a concurrently held by-election for her council seat. Having largely kept her distance from the Liberal Party for many years, she secured endorsements from luminaries from both the Liberal and Conservative circles and won the contest with 31% vote share. Tedjo, the youngest and most junior of the four having secured his first election in 2022, was backed by a number younger councillors and civil leaders and secured a second-place finish with 25% of the vote, and was the only candidate other than the victorious Parrish to have won wards beyond his own.

Crombie's tenure as provincial Liberal leader was brief. Despite a decade as Mayor, the Liberals under her leadership failed to secure any seats in Mississauga in the snap election held in February 2025. Crombie herself was defeated by PC candidate Silvia Gualtieri, mother-in-law of mayor Patrick Brown of neighboring Brampton and third-place finisher behind Tedjo in Ward 2 in the 2022 municipal election. With no seat in the Ontario legislature and a lukewarm endorsement of her leadership from her party, Crombie resigned as provincial leader in September 2025.

=== Campaign Overview ===
The 2026 mayoral contest opened with the byelection winner and runner-up both registering their candidacy on the day nomination opened. Second runner-up Damerla followed a month later in early June.

Having triggered the city's first competitive mayoral race in over four decades with her resignation in 2024, Crombie's entrance to the 2026 contests set up its second. Much of regional media focus on the unique nature of a recently elected incumbent being challenged by a high-profile predecessor, and the decade long rivalry between the two started in a 2011 council byelection during which the McCallion endorsed Crombie defeated Parrish by 241 votes. The 2026 mayoral contest was dominated by overt negativities traded between the two leading candidates, each with profile well beyond the city border. The animosity between them drew significant press attention from regional media.

Early polling results reflected the media attention. Neither Tedjo nor Damerla ever polled more than 20% before Labour Day that year. The dynamic shifted in September, with Tedjo having secured the endorsement of the Peel Regional Police Association, a first for the association. As the contest entered its final month, results released by various pollster put Tedjo in a tight three-way contest as a viable third-option with two better-known rivals having run most of the race denigrating each other.

In the end, Tedjo, the incumbent councillor for the least populous ward of the city and runner-up in the 2024 mayoral by-election, came up in the middle and secured an upset victory against his two immediate predecessors to become Mississauga's eighth mayor, the sixth since the town's almagamation with Port Credit and Streetsville in 1974.

Parrish and Crombie were not the only high-profile veteran municipal leaders felled by comparatively younger challengers in the 2026 municipal election cycle. Their company included neighboring Milton mayor Gordon Krantz, Canada longest serving mayor trounced after a 46-year run; Oakville mayor Rob Burton, a five-term incumbent; and Hamilton mayor Andrea Howarth, a long-time provincial NDP leader.

=== Historical significance ===
Tedjo's victory made him the fourth mayoral challenger in Mississauga's history to have successfully dislodged an incumbent mayor, after the city's first three mayors – Martin Dobkin, Ron Searle and Hazel McCallion – each having ousted their predecessors in the city's first three election (Dobkin having ousted the last pre-amalgamation town mayor Chic Murray), and is the first such occurrence since McCallion defeated Searle in 1978, a few years before Tedjo's birth.

This election was only the second competitive three-way mayoral contest during a regularly-scheduled municipal election. The previous occurrence was 1976, when Searle defeated Dobkin, with prominient business leader (and later Living Arts Centre CEO) Gerry Townsend in third place less than one percentage point behind Dobkin.

Tedjo is the third mayor elected with less than half of the vote share, following Searle with 33.63% in 1976 and Parrish 31.06% in the 2024 mayoral by-election.

Although substantially younger than the recent incumbents, Tedjo would not be the city's youngest mayor ever when he takes office in November. At age 43 he would be 12 years older than the city's inaugural mayor Martin Dobkin, a 31-year old medical doctor and political novice at his 1973 election as the first mayor of the City of Mississauga.

=== Candidates ===
==== Major candidates ====
The mayoral contest featured four candidates who have held elected public offices.

Candidate	Public Office held; past candidacies	Endorsements	Reference
Bonnie Crombie bonniecrombie.ca	Leader of the Ontario Liberal Party (2023–2026); 6th Mayor of Mississauga (2014–2024); Councillor for Ward 5 (2011–2014); Liberal MP for Mississauga—Streetsville (2008–2011)		
Dipika Damerla dipikaformayor.ca/	City councillor for Ward 7 (2018–2026); Liberal MPP for Mississauga East—Cooksville (2011–2018); Provincial cabinet minister, Wynne ministry (2014–2018); 2024 mayoral by-election candidate	Property Taxpayers Alliance; VoteMississauga.com	
Carolyn Parrish parrishformayor.com	Incumbent Mayor of Mississauga (2024–2026); Councillor for Ward 5 (2014–2024), Ward 6 (2006–2010); Liberal/Independent MP for Mississauga—Erindale (1993–2006, Liberal until 2004); Peel Board of Education Trustee (1985–1990)	Shafqat Ali, MP and federal cabinet minister Brad Butt, Councillor for Ward 11, former MP for Mississauga—Streetsville (2011–2015)	
Alvin Tedjo alvintedjo.ca	Councillor for Ward 2 (2022–2026); 2024 mayoral by-election runner-up 2020 Ontario Liberal Party leadership contestant 2018 Ontario Liberal candidate for Oakville North—Burlington	Peel Regional Police Association; Mohamad Fakih; Fares Al Soud, MP for Mississauga Centre	

Other Registered Candidates

- Karam Ahmed
- Aamir Bhatti
- Gord Elliott
- Frank Fang, 4th place in 2022 election for Ward 9, 7th place in 2024 Mississauga mayoral by-election, former Conservative Party of Canada electoral district association CEO
- Amjad Jilani
- Mohsin Khan
- Mike Matulewicz, 2024 mayoral by-election candidate, independent candidate for Mississauga—Erin Mills in the 2025 Ontario general election
- Fadi Naami
- David Shaw, 2022 mayoral election and 2024 mayoral by-election candidate
- Ana Luisa Vasquez de Espinal

==== Withdrawn ====
- Zulfiqar Ali
- Nicholas Joseph, withdrew to run in Ward 8
- Rahul Mehta, withdrew to run in Ward 8
- George Tavares, withdrew to run in Ward 7

=== Graphical Summary ===
Opinion Polling for the 2026 Mississauga Mayoral Election

=== Polling ===
Polling Firm	Source	Final date of poll	Sample Size	MOE	Parrish	Crombie	Tedjo	Damerla	Other	Lead
Mainstreet Research	IVR	25 October 2026	860	±3.3%	26.1%	34.5%	33.4%	5.0%	1.0%	1.1%
Pallas Data	IVR	21 October 2026	508	±4.3%	30%	28%	27%	7%	9%	2%
Liaison Strategies	IVR	20 October 2026	1000	±3.1%	28%	35%	31%	4%	2%	4%
Mainstreet Research	IVR	18 October 2026	942	±3.2%	26.2%	33.6%	28.4%	4.5%	7.3%	5%
Abacus Data	Online Sampling	18 October 2026	700	±3.7%	27%	31%	28%	10%	1%	3%
Liaison Strategies	IVR	4 October 2026	1000	±3.1%	29%	30%	26%	11%	4%	1%
Pallas Data	IVR	1 October 2026	503	±4.4%	34%	25%	21%	14%	7%	9%
Mainstreet Research	IVR	25 September 2026	1404	±2.6%	27.6%	30.4%	20.5%	10.4%	11.2%	2.8%
Canada Pulse Insights	Sago	25 September 2026	514	±4.3%	30%	25%	26%	12%	8%	4%
Pallas Data	IVR	11 September 2026	576	±4.1%	32%	27%	19%	12%	7%	5%
Liaison Strategies	IVR	12 August 2026	1000	±3.1%	35%	35%	12%	18%	—N/a	Tie
Liaison Strategies	IVR	23 October 2025	800	±3.46%	33%	38%	12%	7%	(Note: Includes 6% for Stephen Dasko)10%	5%

=== Mayoral debates ===
- CBC News Toronto, September 25
- CityNews Toronto with Food Banks Mississauga and Metamorphsis Network, October 1

=== Results - Mayor ===
2026 Mississauga municipal election - Mayor (unofficial)
Candidate	Votes	%	(Note: Relative to 2024 byelection)
Alvin Tedjo	74,479	39.21	14.21 ▲
Carolyn Parrish	51,853	27.30	3.76 ▼
Bonnie Crombie	43,191	22.74	–
Dipika Damerla	11,500	6.05	13.32 ▼
Frank Fang	1,822	0.96	0.25 ▼
David Shaw	1,587	0.84	1.19 ▼
Mike Matulewicz	1,188	0.63	0.33 ▲
Karam Ahmed	1,058	0.56	–
Gord Elliott	876	0.46	–
Aamir Bhatti	604	0.32	–
Ana Luisa Vasquez de Espinal	560	0.29	–
Amjad Jilani	537	0.28	–
Mohsin Khan	388	0.20	0.08 ▲
Fadi Naami	311	0.16	–
Total	189,954		

== City council elections ==
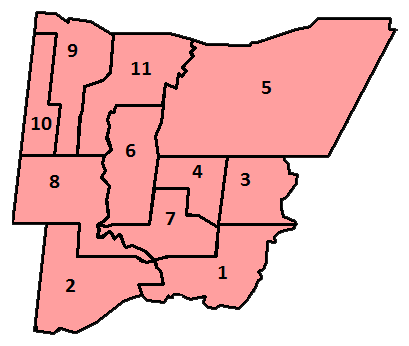
Map of Mississauga's wards

=== Ward 1 ===
2026 Mississauga Municipal Election, Ward 1 Councillor (unofficial)
Candidate	Popular Vote			Notes	Surveys
Candidate	Votes	%	±%	Notes	Surveys
Stephen Dasko	11,458	86.99		Incumbent councillor since 2018	
Olivia Gannon	1,714	13.01			
Total	13172				

=== Ward 2 ===
Ward 2 saw its second consecutive open election, with rookie councillor Alvin Tedjo contesting and winning the mayoralty.

2026 Mississauga Municipal Election, Ward 2 Councillor (unofficial)
Candidate	Popular Vote			Notes	Surveys
Candidate	Votes	%	±%	Notes	Surveys
Tom Ellard	4,434	30.44		management consultant	
Michelle Baker	3,196	21.94		Executive Director, Ontario's Big City Mayors	
Sue Shanly	2,908	19.97		2022 candidate; medical aesthetics and medical research, chair of the Mississauga Residents' Association Network	
LeeAnn Cole	1,410	9.68		Peel District School Board trustee, business owner	
Michael Carroll	531	3.65		small business owner	
Ananya Majumder	470	3.23		did not reply to a survey from Mississauga News	
Alex Ragozzino	433	2.97		business owner	
Abdul Mukhtar Ghafarzoy	246	1.69		did not reply to a survey from Mississauga News	
Audrey Simpson	211	1.45		life insurance advisor, ran in the 2022 election	
Olga Polstvin	172	1.18		mediator	
Syed Jaffery	157	1.08		Perennial candidate Initially filed for then withdrawn candidacy for Ward 9, did not reply to Mississauga News survey	
Samer Fawzi Alghoul	153	1.05			
Ross Kutisker-Jacobson	152	1.04		self-employed in real estate and property management, law student	
Ronnie Amyotte	92	0.63		retired	
Total	14,565				

=== Ward 3 ===
2026 Mississauga Municipal Election, Ward 3 Councillor (unofficial)
Candidate	Popular Vote			Notes	Surveys
Candidate	Votes	%	±%	Notes	Surveys
Chris Fonseca	8,760	57.87		incumbent councillor since 2010	
Kim Pines	4,161	27.49		president of a translation company	
Mendi Kabashi	849	5.61		condominium manager	
Stjepan Vukovic	723	4.78		local entrepreneur, and active community member	
Arshad Hashmi	645	4.26		did not reply to a survey from Mississauga News	
Total	15,138				

=== Ward 4 ===
2026 Mississauga Municipal Election, Ward 4 Councillor (unofficial)
Candidate	Popular Vote			Notes	Surveys
Candidate	Votes	%	±%	Notes	Surveys
John Kovac	12,643	79.53		incumbent councillor since 2014 and deputy mayor.	
Khawar Hussain	1,836	11.55		former health inspector. The NDP candidate for Mississauga East–Cooksville in the 2022 provincial election and 2025 federal elections	
Humphrey Chukwuemeka	724	4.55		executive director, The Local was unable to find his campaign platform online.	
Zulfiqar Ali	695	4.37		Perennial candidate, registered for mayoral contest and withdrew three days later, did not reply to Mississauga News survey. The Local was unable to find campaign information online	
Total	15,898				

=== Ward 5 ===
Bonnie Crombie claimed to Toronto Star that alleged "threats on social media" from Danny Singh were being investigated by Peel Regional Police. Singh denies the suggestion, and was unaware of any investigation. Incumbent councillor Hart sent Singh two cease-and-desist letters in 2025.

2026 Mississauga Municipal Election, Ward 5 Councillor (unofficial)
Candidate	Popular Vote			Notes	Surveys
Candidate	Votes	%	±%	Notes	Surveys
Natalie Hart	7,331	42.36		Incumbent councillor elected in the 2024 by-election	
Aruna Anand	2,646	15.29			
Ismail Bawa	2,299	13.29			
Danny Singh	1,485	8.58			
Mandeep Singh Dhaliwal	1,364	7.88			
Michael Anthony Perretta	797	4.61			
Rosemarie Sanchez Sanchez	617	3.57		candidate for Ward 5 in the 2024 by-election	
Raghavan Babu Bhogaiah	362	2.09			
Jamie Dookie	296	1.71			
Vipan Mehta	108	0.62			
Total	17,305				

=== Ward 6 ===
Joe Horneck contested the seat unsuccessfully in 2018, against incumbent Ron Starr. Horneck was elected as councillor in 2022, after Starr faced harassment allegations from a female former councillor.

2026 Mississauga Municipal Election, Ward 6 Councillor (unofficial)
Candidate	Popular Vote			Notes	Surveys
Candidate	Votes	%	±%	Notes	Surveys
Joe Horneck	13,308	67.16		incumbent councillor since 2022	
Michael Bastian	2,089	10.54			
Martina Wood	1,703	8.59			
Ahmad Reshad Hatefi	1,323	6.68			
Gurcharan Guleria	759	3.83			
Javed Dean	633	3.19			
Total	19,815				

=== Ward 7 ===
Ward 7 feature an open contest, as Dipika Damerla, incumbent since 2018 unsuccessfully contested the mayoralty

2026 Mississauga Municipal Election, Ward 7 Councillor (unofficial)
Candidate	Popular Vote			Notes	Surveys
Candidate	Votes	%	±%	Notes	Surveys
Lucas Alves	4,460	26.21		former Peel District School Board trustee, board vice-chair	
George Tavares	1,778	10.45		Business owner, 2022 mayoral and 2024 mayoral by-election candidate	
Naila Saeed	1,680	9.87		Childcare franchise operator, 2025 Ontario NDP candidate for Aurora—Oak Ridges—Richmond Hill, 2025 New Democratic Party candidate for Don Valley North	
Leslie Zurek-Silvestri	1,457	8.56		Nurse and health-care consultant, former president of Art Gallery of Mississauga, 2018 and 2022 candidate in Ward 7, faced controversy mid-campaign upon release of workplace conduct investigation findings	
Jerry Krzywda	1,027	6.03			
Gerald Adad	953	5.6			
Louroz Mercader	833	4.89		Ward 7 candidate in 2010, 2014, and 2018	
Ahsan Khokhar	787	4.62			
Joel Binda	761	4.47		Former City of Mississauga Finance department staff.	
Keshav Mandadi	723	4.25			
Peter Tolias	688	4.04		Business owner.	
Maisa Salhia	586	3.44			
Amir Ali	419	2.46			
Asha Falinski	330	1.94			
Amitabh Srivastava	280	1.65			
Tassawar Syed	139	0.82			
Hazra Wade	117	0.69			
Total	17,018				

=== Ward 8 ===
In June 2024, Mahoney was appointed Deputy Mayor; the title was shared later in the term with John Kovac. After the resignation of Carolyn Parrish from the Peel Police Services Board in 2024, Mahoney was appointed to the position. Mahoney was first elected in 2014, after the retirement of his mother, incumbent Ward 8 councillor Katie Mahoney.

2026 Mississauga Municipal Election, Ward 8 Councillor (unofficial)
Candidate	Popular Vote			Notes	Surveys
Candidate	Votes	%	±%	Notes	Surveys
Matt Mahoney	14,007	74.84		Incumbent councillor since 2014	
Rahul Mehta	1,677	8.96		Active Living Specialist at Peel Multicultural Council, candidate for Ward 8 in the 2022 municipal election, member of Stop Sprawl Peel	
Valerie Hogue	1,382	7.38		independent consultant	
Viktoria Manzar	862	4.61		HR manager	
Grzegorz Nowacki	787	4.21		candidate in 2018 for the same ward	
Total	18,715				

=== Ward 9 ===
After 31 years as councillor, Pat Saito retired at the end of the 2018–2022 term of council. One of three open seats, the race attracted eleven registered candidates, including Martin Reid, who had job-shadowed Saito for two years. After the resignation of Bonnie Crombie as Mayor of Mississauga, Reid served as Acting Mayor.

2026 Mississauga Municipal Election, Ward 9 Councillor (unofficial)
Candidate	Popular Vote			Notes	Surveys
Candidate	Votes	%	±%	Notes	Surveys
Martin Reid	11,758	74.02		Incumbent councillor	
Anwar Knight	2,961	18.64		television weather anchor, founder of Hold Schools Accountable Parent Network	
Ramsha Haq	632	3.98			
Mohammad Shabbeer	533	3.36		2022 candidate for Ward 9	
Total	15,884				

Syed Jaffery was a candidate but withdrew.

=== Ward 10 ===
Sue McFadden was the incumbent councillor with 20 years service, and further raised her profile having contested the 2025 Canadian Federal election against incumbent cabinet minister Rechie Valdez.

2026 Mississauga Municipal Election, Ward 10 Councillor (unofficial)
Candidate	Popular Vote			Notes	Surveys
Candidate	Votes	%	±%	Notes	Surveys
Sue McFadden	15,787	79.64		Incumbent Councillor since 2006, 2025 federal Conservative candidate for Mississauga—Streetsville	
Hamza Bajwa	1,624	8.19			
Salman Tariq	1,019	5.14		owner of an immigration business, LL.M. student at Osgoode Hall Law School, 2019 federal NDP candidate for Mississauga-Erin Mills	
Suha Hashim	715	3.61			
Aatish Jamal	678	3.42		childcare business owner	
Total	19,823				

=== Ward 11 ===
2026 Mississauga Municipal Election, Ward 11 Councillor (unofficial)
Candidate	Popular Vote			Notes	Surveys
Candidate	Votes	%	±%	Notes	Surveys
Brad Butt	10,099	62.15		incumbent councillor since 2022	
Dev Vashi	4,873	29.99			
Amin Nanji	1,277	7.86			
Total	16,249				
