= Dipika Damerla =

Canadian politician

The Honourable Dipika Damerla ECO
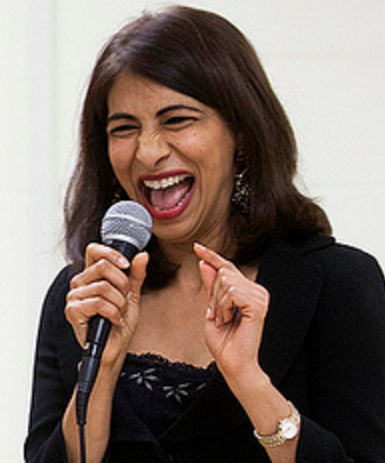

Mississauga City Councillor
- In office December 3, 2018 – November 15, 2026
- Preceded by: Nando Iannica
- Succeeded by: Lucas Alves
- Constituency: Ward 7 (Cooksville)

Minister of Seniors Affairs
- In office June 13, 2016 – June 28, 2018
- Premier: Kathleen Wynne
- Preceded by: Mario Sergio
- Succeeded by: Raymond Cho

Associate Minister for Long-Term Care and Wellness
- In office June 24, 2014 – June 13, 2016
- Premier: Kathleen Wynne

Member of the Ontario Provincial Parliament for Mississauga East—Cooksville
- In office October 6, 2011 – June 7, 2018
- Preceded by: Peter Fonseca
- Succeeded by: Kaleed Rasheed

Personal details
- Born: Hyderabad, Telangana, India
- Party: Independent (Note: Municipal politicians in Ontario run on a non-partisan basis.)
- Other political affiliations: Liberal
- Children: 1
- Education: University of Toronto
- Website: dipikadamerla.ca

Dipika Damerla is a Canadian politician in Mississauga, Ontario. She is the former Mississauga City Councillor for Ward 7, the neighbourhood of Cooksville, from her swearing-in on December 3, 2018 until 2026. Previously, Damerla was a Liberal member of the Legislative Assembly of Ontario representing the riding of Mississauga East—Cooksville from 2011 to 2018. She served as Minister of Seniors Affairs in the Cabinet of Premier Kathleen Wynne. On March 7, 2024, Damerla announced that she would run in the 2024 Mississauga mayoral by-election. She placed third with 19.4%, losing to Carolyn Parrish. She later placed fourth in the 2026 Mississauga mayoral election.

== Background ==
Damerla was born in a Telugu family in Secunderabad, Andhra Pradesh (present day Telangana), India. After emigrating to Canada she earned her MBA from the Rotman School of Management at the University of Toronto. She worked in corporate banking at the Royal Bank of Canada and the Bank of Nova Scotia. Prior to her first election to the Ontario Legislature she was Senior Policy Advisor to Ontario's Minister of Economic Development and Trade. She lives in Mississauga with her daughter, Sharmeila.

== Provincial politics ==
Damerla is a member of the Ontario Liberal Party. She won a tough 2011 nomination race to be the Liberal candidate for Mississauga East—Cooksville, beating Nancy Fonseca (the sister of previous Mississauga East—Cooksville MPP Peter Fonseca). She beat her nearest rival, Progressive Conservative Zoran Churchin by 4,238 votes in the 2011 provincial election.

In November 2011, she was appointed as Parliamentary Assistant to the Minister of Infrastructure. In April 2012, Damerla introduced a resolution to reform the 1998 Condominium Act. Her resolution would help facilitate disputes between condominium boards and owners. She said that the current system is long and costly. She said, "the act provided a dispute resolution process which was right for that time and the place. However, 14 years later, times have changed. Our province is a very different place now." The resolution passed first reading in June.

She was re-elected in the 2014 provincial election.

In June 2014, Damerla was appointed as an Associate Minister (minister without portfolio) for the Ministry of Health and Long-Term Care focusing on long-term care. She then succeeded Mario Sergio as Minister responsible for Seniors Affairs, another minister without portfolio position, in a June 13, 2016 cabinet shuffle.

Damerla was appointed Minister of Seniors Affairs, leading a new standalone ministry created from the former Ontario Seniors' Secretariat, on January 12, 2017.

In the 2018 provincial election, Damerla was defeated in Mississauga East—Cooksville by Progressive Conservative candidate Kaleed Rasheed by a margin of 4739 votes.

Damerla was an early endorser of Steven Del Duca's 2019-20 leadership bid, co-hosting his campaign's first event targeting former Queen's Park staffers with fellow former MPP Han Dong. She contested her former provincial seat again in 2022, closing the gap from 11% to 3.5% (1206 votes margin) but losing again to Rasheed, by then a cabinet minister.

== Municipal politics ==
Following her defeat in the 2018 provincial election, Damerla ran as a candidate to replace long-time Ward 7 Mississauga City Councillor Nando Iannica in the 2018 Mississauga municipal election, winning easily with 41% of the vote to the runner-up's 16% and became the first new councillor for Ward 7 in over 30 years. Despite her provincial loss in June 2022, she was re-elected easily later that year with 55% of the vote.

Damerla was one of the four sitting councillors who contested the 2024 mayoral by-election to replace Bonnie Crombie, who resigned after being elected leader of the Ontario Liberal Party in December 2023. Despite polls showing her as a close challenger to frontrunner and eventual winner Carolyn Parrish, Damerla finished third with 19% behind fellow councillor Alvin Tedjo.

In 2026, Damerla decided not to seek re-election to her council seat and ran for mayor again; she placed fourth in the 2026 Mississauga mayoral election, behind Alvin Tedjo, Parrish, and Crombie.

== Electoral record ==
=== Municipal ===
Mississauga municipal election, 2018: Ward 7
Candidate	Votes	%
Dipika Damerla	4,566	41.25
Andrew Gassmann	1,762	15.92
Leslie Zurek-Silvestri	1,399	12.64
9 other candidates	3,341	30.19
Total	11,068	100.00

=== Provincial ===
2022 Ontario general election: Mississauga East—Cooksville
Party	Candidate	Votes	%	±%
Progressive Conservative	Kaleed Rasheed	13,840	40.91	–0.24
Liberal	Dipika Damerla	12,634	37.35	+7.11
New Democratic	Khawar Hussain	3,664	10.83	–11.91
New Blue	Mark Morrissey	1,599	4.73	–
Green	James Hea	1,345	3.98	+0.52
Ontario Party	Gregory Tomchyshyn	625	1.85	–
Moderate	Wiktor Jachtholtz	121	0.36	–0.05
Total valid votes		33,828	99.35	
Total rejected, unmarked and declined ballots		222	0.65	–0.37
Turnout		34,050	39.58	–11.89
Eligible voters		86,019		
Progressive Conservative hold		Swing		–3.68
Source: Elections Ontario

2018 Ontario general election: Mississauga East—Cooksville
Party	Candidate	Votes	%	±%
Progressive Conservative	Kaleed Rasheed	17,862	41.15	+13.22
Liberal	Dipika Damerla	13,123	30.23	–19.96
New Democratic	Tom Takacs	9,871	22.74	+7.83
Green	Basia Krzyzanowski	1,498	3.45	–0.20
Libertarian	Mark Donaldson	463	1.07	–
None of the Above	Leonard Little	413	0.95	–
Moderate	Mykola Ponomarenko	175	0.40	–
Total valid votes		43,405	98.98	
Total rejected, unmarked and declined ballots		447	1.02	
Turnout		43,852	51.48	
Eligible voters		85,190		
Progressive Conservative notional gain from Liberal		Swing		+16.59
Source: Elections Ontario

2014 Ontario general election: Mississauga East—Cooksville
Party	Candidate	Votes	%	±%
Liberal	Dipika Damerla	20,934	52.33	+6.59
Progressive Conservative	Zoran Churchin	10,479	26.20	–7.07
New Democratic	Fayaz Karim	6,158	15.39	–1.40
Green	Linh Nguyen	1,408	3.52	+0.77
Libertarian	Levko Iwanusiw	788	1.97	–
Equal Parenting	Dolly Catena	234	0.58	–
Total valid votes		40,001	98.63	
Total rejected, unmarked and declined ballots		557	1.37	+0.81
Turnout		40,558	43.89	+3.39
Eligible voters		92,402		
Liberal hold		Swing		+6.83
Source: Elections Ontario

2011 Ontario general election: Mississauga East—Cooksville
Party	Candidate	Votes	%	±%
Liberal	Dipika Damerla	15,535	45.74	–13.19
Progressive Conservative	Zoran Churchin	11,297	33.26	+10.18
New Democratic	Waseem Ahmed	5,704	16.79	+8.34
Green	Lloyd Jones	934	2.75	–3.50
Independent	Winston Harding	199	0.59	–
Freedom	Jonathon Dury	177	0.52	–0.12
Paramount Canadians	Shriya Shah-Klorfine	117	0.34	–
Total valid votes		33,963	99.44	
Total rejected, unmarked and declined ballots		191	0.56	–0.36
Turnout		34,154	40.50	–6.98
Eligible voters		84,330		
Liberal hold		Swing		–11.69
Source: Elections Ontario
