= 2024 Mississauga mayoral by-election =

Municipal election in Ontario, Canada

- June 10, 2024
- Turnout: 25.67% (▲3.83pp)
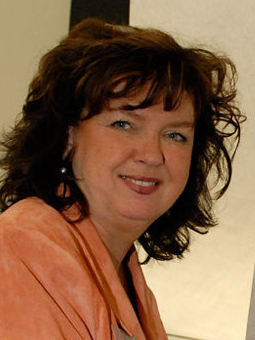

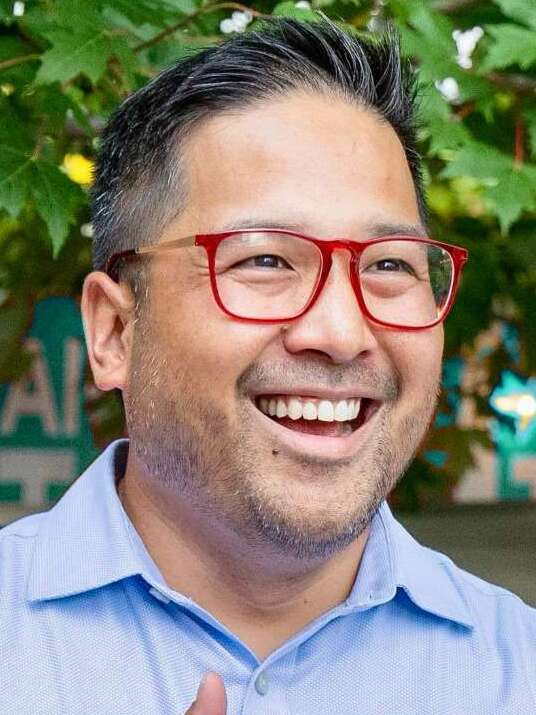

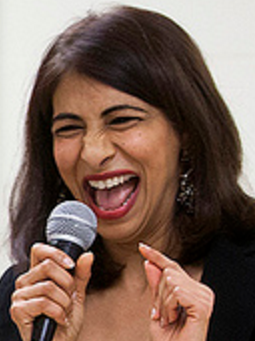

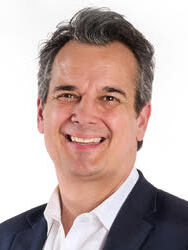
Candidate	Carolyn Parrish	Alvin Tedjo
Popular vote	43,494	35,005
Percentage	31.06%	25.00%
Candidate	Dipika Damerla	Stephen Dasko
Popular vote	27,119	22,408
Percentage	19.37%	16.00%
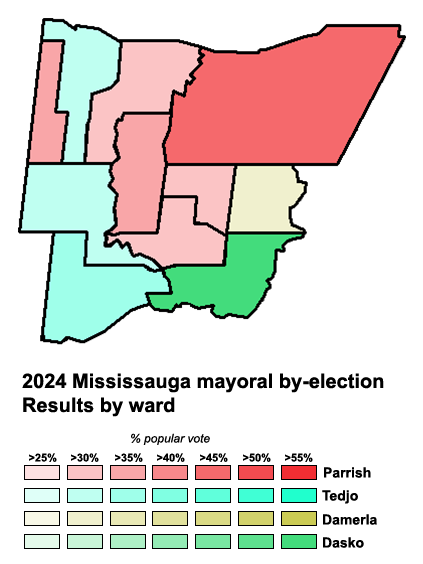
- Results by ward
Mayor before election
Vacant (Note: Bonnie Crombie, who was re-elected as Mayor of Mississauga in 2022, resigned on January 12, 2024, after winning the 2023 Ontario Liberal Party leadership election.)
Elected mayor
Carolyn Parrish

The 2024 Mississauga mayoral by-election was held on June 10, 2024, to elect the 7th mayor of Mississauga, Ontario, Canada, to serve the remainder of the 2022-2026 term following the resignation of mayor Bonnie Crombie. The election, held under first-past-the-post voting, was won by Carolyn Parrish, a city councillor and former member of Parliament (MP). She defeated fellow city councillors Alvin Tedjo, Dipika Damerla, Stephen Dasko, and 16 other candidates. Parrish was sworn in as mayor on June 24.

A by-election for city councillor was held in Ward 5 on the same date, with incumbent councillor Parrish choosing to resign her seat in council to run in the mayoral by-election. That race was won by Natalie Hart who was also sworn in on June 24.

== Background ==
=== Resignation of Bonnie Crombie and subsequent vacancy ===
Bonnie Crombie
(@MayorCrombie)
tweeted:

Yesterday, I was successfully voted in as the @OntLiberal Party leader. Sadly, this means my time as the Mayor of #Mississauga will be coming to an end early in the new year. Know that this city will always be my home and I’m incredibly proud of what we’ve accomplished together.

December 3, 2023

In May 2023, Crombie announced that she had formed an exploratory committee for a candidacy for the leadership of the Ontario Liberal Party. The decision was made public days after the announcement of the dissolution of Peel Region. Her campaign was registered in June.

Upon announcing her candidacy, Crombie said it would be restricted to evenings and weekends to allow her to continue as mayor of Mississauga. Councillor Carolyn Parrish publicly called for Crombie to take immediate leave, suggesting that her remaining in the position would hurt city-province relations. Councillor Stephen Dasko expressed concerns about collaboration with the province.

=== By-election process ===
In June 2023, Councillor Alvin Tedjo spoke against the concept of an appointed mayor serving the remainder of the term if Crombie won. Mississauga was given strong mayor powers after the statement, a change that legislatively requires a by-election in this situation.

Councillor Joe Horneck looked to ban candidates for mayor from holding the rotating position of acting mayor. The change was requested at the December 13 meeting of council. Mississauga News noted that John Kovac was acting mayor for December and January, and had not ruled out a run for mayor, and that announced candidate Carolyn Parrish was scheduled for February and March. Parrish agreed to the change. Councillor Matt Mahoney requested the concept be referred to the city's governance committee, who will meet January 29. Acting mayors cannot use that title if they endorse a candidate.

The City of Mississauga estimated a $3.5 million cost to a by-election, to be funded from election reserves. Carolyn Parrish decided to resign from her Ward 5 seat upon registering as a mayoral candidate; any ward by-election would cost $500,000. The city aimed to hire 1700 election workers.

On January 31, Mississauga City Council received a report from the city clerk, with recommendations on the election. It proposed that the nomination process last from March 6 to April 26, with the main election day on June 10. That day was a professional activity day for the two main school boards, freeing space for voting locations.

=== Timeline ===
==== 2022 ====
- September 7 - Bonnie Crombie kicks off her re-election campaign for the mayoralty.
- October 24 - Crombie is announced as the victor in the mayoral election.

==== 2023 ====
- May 23 - Crombie forms an exploratory committee for the upcoming Ontario Liberal Party leadership election.
- June 14 - Crombie officially enters the 2023 Ontario Liberal Party leadership election.
- December 2 - Crombie is elected party leader of the Ontario Liberal Party on the third ballot.
- December 3 - Crombie announces that she will be resigning as Mayor of Mississauga.
- December 5 - City councillors Stephen Dasko and Carolyn Parrish announce their candidacies.

==== 2024 ====
- January 5 - 2022 runner-up David Shaw and third-place finisher George Tavares announce their candidacies.
- January 12 - Crombie officially resigns as the Mayor of Mississauga.
- January 29 - City councillor Alvin Tedjo announces his candidacy.
- March 6 - Candidate nomination period opens.
- April 25 - Candidate nomination period closes.
- May 24-25 - Advance polls open at the Mississauga Civic Centre.
- June 1-2 - Advance polls open at various locations across the city.
- June 10 - Election day, polls close at 8 pm.

== Mayoral debates ==
Date	Location	Debate Name/Topics	Moderator	Hosts & Affiliates	Participants	Recording
May 3, 2024	Rama Gaming House (2295 Battleford Rd.)	Mayoral Candidates Meeting	Ryan Gurcharn	Host: Meadowvale Business Association	Dipika Damerla, Stephen Dasko, Jainstien Dookie, Syed Jaffrey, Carolyn Parrish, David Shaw, George Tavares, Alvin Tedjo (all attended)	
May 6, 2024	Clark Memorial Hall (161 Lakeshore Rd. W.)	Residents' QnA Session		Hosts: Town of Port Credit Association, Credit Reserve Association, Orchard Heights Homeowners’ Association, Cranberry Cove Ratepayers Association		
May 7, 2024	Burnhamthorpe Library - Maja Prentice Theatre (3650 Dixie Rd.)	QnA Session		Host: Mississauga Residents’ Associations Network		
May 13, 2024	University of Toronto Mississauga - Instructional Centre (1599 Outer Cir.), Room IB120	Official Housing Debate	Leena Latafat	Host: More Homes Mississauga Affiliates: University of Toronto Mississauga Urbanism Club	Carolyn Parrish (declined), Dipika Damerla (attended), Alvin Tedjo (attended)	Video
May 23, 2024	Food Banks Mississauga (4544 Eastgate Pkwy.)	Social, economic, housing, and food insecurity issues		Host: Food Banks Mississauga		
May 27, 2024	University of Toronto Mississauga - Student Centre (1815 Inner Cir.)	Mississauga's Next 50 Years	Ahmad Elbayoumi	Host: NewsBeyond, Mainstreet Research, Aurora Strategy Global, University of Toronto Mississauga Students' Union Affiliates: University of Toronto Mississauga Urbanism Club	Invited: Carolyn Parrish (declined), Dipika Damerla (attended), Alvin Tedjo (attended), Stephen Dasko (attended)	Video
May 29, 2024	Sheridan College - Hazel McCallion Campus (4180 Duke of York Blvd.)	General Candidates' Debate	Angie Seth	Hosts: United Way Greater Toronto, Sheridan College, Mississauga Board of Trade, Metamorphosis Network	Brian Crombie, Dipika Damerla, Stephen Dasko, George Tavares, Alvin Tedjo; Invited: Carolyn Parrish (declined)	
May 30, 2024	Televised	General	David Common	Host: CBC Toronto	Carolyn Parrish (declined), Dipika Damerla (attended), Alvin Tedjo (attended), Stephen Dasko (attended)	Broadcast info

== Candidates ==
=== Registered ===
==== Zulfiqar Ali ====
Candidacy registered: April 15, 2024

==== Diya Atassi ====
Born in Flensburg Germany 1969, B.Sc in Mechanical Engineering, Political Activist, Community Leader, Businessman and CEO of Grille Solutions LTD and CEO of Syrian Canadian Art Council.

Candidacy registered: April 11, 2024
Campaign website: atassiformayor.ca

==== Brian Crombie ====
Businessman and former CFO for the Ottawa Senators. Former husband of previous Mississauga mayor Bonnie Crombie. Past president of the Mississauga Arts Council and Transit Alliance. Local radio and YouTube talk show host. None of the Above Party candidate for Mississauga—Lakeshore in the 2022 provincial election.

Candidacy registered: April 24, 2024
Campaign website: briancrombie.ca

==== Dipika Damerla ====
Dipika Damerla is the city councillor for Ward 7 (Cooksville), since 2018. She was the Liberal MPP for Mississauga East—Cooksville from 2011-2018 and a provincial cabinet minister under Kathleen Wynne.

Candidacy registered: March 7, 2024
Campaign website: dipikaformayor.ca
Endorsements: Martin Reid, Mississauga city councillor, Ward 9 (2022- )

==== Stephen Dasko ====
Stephen Dasko is the city councillor for Ward 1 (Lakeview, Port Credit, Mineola) since 2018. Before entering politics, Dasko was a tech industry executive.

Candidacy announced: December 5, 2023
Candidacy registered: March 6, 2024
Campaign website: www.daskoformayor.com
Endorsements: Sue McFadden, Mississauga city councillor, Ward 10; Pat Mullins, former Mississauga city councillor, Ward 2; Martin Reid, Mississauga city councillor, Ward 9 (2022- )

==== Jamie Dookie ====
He finished 8th of 8 candidates in the 2000 municipal election. He was nominated to run in the 2000 Federal Election in Mississauga East for the Canadian Alliance, finishing 2nd of 7 candidates. He abandoned running for Mississauga councillor ward 6, and ran in the 2014 election for ward 10.

Candidacy registered: March 15, 2024
Campaign website: dookie4mayor.com

==== Frank Fang ====
Previously a Conservative Party of Canada electoral district association CEO. Finished fourth in the 2022 municipal election for Mississauga ward 9 councillor.

Candidacy registered: March 8, 2024
Campaign website: votefrankfang.com

==== Xiaohua Gong ====
A non-resident who owns property in the City of Mississauga. Owner of Canada National TV and a hotel business. Pleaded guilty to running an international pyramid scheme and using forged documents; charges were later withdrawn. Placed 11th in the 2023 Toronto mayoral by-election.

Candidacy registered: April 25, 2024
Campaign website: gong4mayor.ca

==== Winston Harding ====
Candidate for Ward 1 in the 2014 municipal election, placing fifth of six; Ward 7 in the 2018 municipal election, placing 11th of 12; and Ward 3 in the 2022 municipal election. Also ran as an independent candidate for Mississauga East-Cooksville in the 2011 provincial election.

Candidacy registered: April 10, 2024

==== Sara Iqbal ====
Candidacy registered: April 11, 2024

==== Syed Jaffrey ====
Ward 9 candidate in the 2018 municipal election; Ward 2 candidate in the 2022 municipal election.

Candidacy registered: March 8, 2024

==== Mitchell Maceachern ====
Candidacy registered: April 23, 2024

==== Sinisa Mandrapa ====
Real Estate Broker, Mortgage Broker, and Regulated Canadian Immigration Consultant

Candidacy registered: April 5, 2024
Campaign website: mandrapaformayor.com
Campaign slogan: "Leading Mississauga Forward: Together, We Thrive!"

==== Mike Matulewicz ====
Campaign website: mikeformississaugamayor.com

==== Carolyn Parrish ====
Carolyn Parrish, 77, was the city councillor for Ward 5 (Britannia Woods, Malton) from 2014 until 2024, when she resigned to run in the mayoral by-election. She previously served as the MP for Mississauga West (1993–1997), Mississauga Centre (1997–2004), and Mississauga—Erindale (2004–2006), and was a trustee on the Peel Board of Education (1985–1990). Before entering politics, Parrish was a high school teacher.

Candidacy announced: December 5, 2023
Candidacy registered: March 6, 2024
Campaign website: parrishformayor.com
Campaign slogan: Leading the Way
Endorsements: Brad Butt, Mississauga Ward 11 councillor (since 2022), former MP (2011–2015); Gurbax Singh Malhi, retired MP (1993–2011); Peter McCallion, son of Hazel McCallion, Martin Reid, Mississauga city councillor, Ward 9 (since 2022) Pat Saito, retired Mississauga Ward 9 councillor (1991–2022); Harinder Takhar, former MPP (2003–2018); Senator Victor Oh; Nav Bhatia.

==== David Shaw ====
David Shaw is a businessman and former 2018 provincial Libertarian candidate for Brampton West. He was the runner-up in the 2022 mayoral election.

Candidacy announced: January 5, 2024
Candidacy registered: March 7, 2024
Campaign website: iwillworkforthepeople.ca

==== George Tavares ====
George Tavares is a businessperson and the third-place finisher in the 2022 mayoral election. His education includes Political Science, International Business, Engineering, Smart City Design and Canadian Indigenous Studies.

Candidacy announced: January 5, 2024
Candidacy registered: March 7, 2024
Campaign website: www.tavaresformayor.ca
Campaign slogan: Empowering Progress, Inspiring Change: George Tavares for Mayor 2024

==== Alvin Tedjo ====
Alvin Tedjo is the city councillor for Ward 2 (Clarkson, Lorne Park) since 2022. Prior to entering politics, Tedjo had served as the director of Government Relations for Sheridan College and was a political staffer to various ministers at the Ministry of Training, Colleges and Universities. He also was the Liberal candidate in Oakville North—Burlington for the 2018 provincial election and a candidate for the 2020 Ontario Liberal Party leadership election, placing fifth.

Candidacy announced: January 29, 2024
Candidacy registered: March 6, 2024
Campaign website: www.alvintedjo.ca
Endorsements: Lucas Alves, public school trustee, Mississauga Wards 3 and 4; Joe Horneck, Mississauga city councillor, Ward 6 (2022- ); Erika McCallion, one of Hazel McCallion's granddaughters, a political campaign worker; Sue McFadden, Mississauga city councillor, Ward 10 (2006- ); Jill Promoli, public school trustee, Mississauga Wards 6 and 11; Martin Reid, Mississauga city councillor, Ward 9 (2022- ); Jennifer Keesmaat, urban planner; Mat Siscoe, mayor of St. Catharines.

==== Nathalie Xian Yi Yan ====
Hamilton-based traditional Chinese medicine practitioner. Ran a city council candidate in 2006 and 2010 Hamilton municipal elections, for the Hamilton Mountain NDP provincial nomination in 2007, for the Flamborough-Glanbrook NDP provincial nomination in 2018, as a mayoral candidate in the 2018 Hamilton municipal election, as an independent in Hamilton Centre for the 2022 provincial election, candidate in the 2023 Toronto mayoral by-election, placing 54th of 102.

Candidacy registered: March 15, 2024

=== Withdrawn ===
==== Peter McCallion ====
Peter McCallion is the son of former mayor Hazel McCallion. He wants the city to bid for an NHL and a PWHL team.

Candidacy registered: March 6, 2024

==== Peter Tolias ====
Owner of a landscaping and plowing company.

Candidacy registered: March 6, 2024

=== Declined ===
- Brad Butt, city councillor for Ward 11 (Meadowvale Village, Streetsville) (2022–present) and former Conservative MP for Mississauga—Streetsville (2011—2015)
- Nokha Dakroub, former Peel District School Board trustee, unsuccessful council candidate
- Mohamad Fakih, philanthropist and founder and CEO of Paramount Fine Foods
- Joe Horneck, city councillor for Ward 6 (Mavis-Erindale, Creditview, Erindale) (2022–present)
- John Kovac, city councillor for Ward 4
- Matt Mahoney, city councillor for Ward 8 (Erin Mills) (2014–present)
- Sue McFadden, city councillor for Ward 10 (Lisgar, Churchill Meadows) (2006–present) (became the Conservative candidate in Mississauga—Streetsville)

== Polling ==
Polling firm	Source	Last date of polling	Sample Size (Note: Key: DV – decided voters AV – all voters)	MoE	Alvin Tedjo	Brian Crombie	Carolyn Parrish	Christine Simundson	David Shaw	Dipika Damerla	George Tavares	Peter McCallion	Stephen Dasko	Undecided
Mainstreet Research	PDF	June 9, 2024	866 (IVR)	± 3.3%	22%	4%	29%	—N/a	—N/a	20%	—N/a	—N/a	17%	8%
Liaison Strategies	HTML	June 5, 2024	914 (DV)	± 3.22%	23%	5%	24%	—N/a	—N/a	23%	—N/a	—N/a	18%	-
Liaison Strategies	HTML	June 5, 2024	914 (AV)	± 3.22%	19%	4%	20%	—N/a	—N/a	19%	—N/a	—N/a	15%	18%
Mainstreet Research	PDF	June 4, 2024	1176 (IVR)	± 2.9%	21%	5%	25%	—N/a	—N/a	24%	—N/a	—N/a	18%	18%
Pollara	HTML	June 2, 2024	606 (IVR)	± 4%	24%	—N/a	27%	—N/a	—N/a	20%	—N/a	—N/a	23%	
Liaison Strategies	HTML	May 25, 2024	933 (DV)	± 3.22%	19%	9%	29%	—N/a	—N/a	24%	—N/a	—N/a	12%	-
Liaison Strategies	HTML	May 25, 2024	933 (AV)	± 3.22%	16%	8%	25%	—N/a	—N/a	20%	—N/a	—N/a	10%	16%
Mainstreet Research	PDF	May 17, 2024	1036 (IVR)	± 3%	15%	—N/a	32%	—N/a	—N/a	23%	—N/a	—N/a	19%	28%
Liaison Strategies	HTML	May 6, 2024	907 (DV)	± 3.25%	17%	7%	37%	—N/a	3%	20%	5%	—N/a	11%	-
Liaison Strategies	HTML	May 6, 2024	907 (AV)	± 3.25%	13%	5%	28%	—N/a	2%	15%	4%	—N/a	8%	25%
Mainstreet Research	PDF	April 8, 2024	887 (IVR)	± 3.3%	11%	—N/a	34%	—N/a	—N/a	19%	—N/a	14%	17%	6%
Liaison Strategies	HTML	March 22, 2024	902 (DV)	± 3.26%	21%	—N/a	29%	—N/a	3%	24%	6%	10%	8%	-
Liaison Strategies	HTML	March 22, 2024	902 (AV)	± 3.26%	13%	—N/a	18%	—N/a	2%	15%	4%	6%	5%	37%
Mainstreet Research	PDF	February 4, 2024	1183 (IVR)	± 2.8%	8%	—N/a	34%	—N/a	—N/a	9%	—N/a	14%	16%	19%
Liaison Strategies	PDF	January 11, 2024	983 (DV)	± 3.06%	16%	—N/a	35%	6%	4%	24%	10%	—N/a	6%	-
Liaison Strategies	PDF	January 11, 2024	983 (AV)	± 3%	8%	—N/a	18%	3%	2%	12%	5%	—N/a	3%	49%

== Results ==
2024 Mississauga mayoral by-election, June 10, 2024 Resignation of Bonnie Crombie
Candidate	Popular vote			Expenditures
Candidate	Votes	%	±%	Expenditures
Carolyn Parrish	43,494	31.06	–	$524,816.30
Alvin Tedjo	35,005	25.00	–	$300,278.25
Dipika Damerla	27,119	19.37	–	$576,469.83
Stephen Dasko	22,408	16.00	–	$291,998.83
David Shaw	2,843	2.03	-6.80	$4,511.51
Brian Crombie	2,242	1.60	–	$9,888.92
Frank Fang	1,694	1.21	–	$17,269.65
George Tavares	962	0.69	-4.63	$163.42
Xiao Hua Gong	598	0.43	–	$45,166.50
Diya Atassi	545	0.39	–	$8,522.66
Zulfiqar Ali	528	0.38	–	$971.23
Mike Matulewicz	424	0.30	–	none listed
Sinisa Mandrapa	417	0.30	–	$25,534.00
Sara Iqbal	359	0.26	–	$0.00
Jamie Dookie	302	0.22	–	$846.00
Nathalie Xian Yi Yan	297	0.21	–	$1,200.00
Mitchell MacEachern	238	0.17	–	$0.00
Winston Harding	206	0.15	–	$1,575.00
Mohsin Khan	170	0.12	–	$0.00
Syed Jaffery	169	0.12	–	$8,116.00
Total valid votes	140,020	99.89		
Rejected, unmarked and declined	161	0.11		
Turnout	140,181	25.67	+3.83	
Eligible voters	545,512			
Note: Candidate campaign colours are based on the prominent colour used in campaign items (signs, literature, etc.) or colours used in polling graphs and are used as a visual differentiation between candidates.
Sources: City of Mississauga
