= 2022 Mississauga municipal election =

Municipal election in Ontario, Canada

The 2022 Mississauga municipal elections were part of the larger Peel Region and Ontario municipal elections, that took place on Monday, October 24, 2022. The election saw one of the highest turnovers in history, with the retirements of Pat Saito and George Carlson, and the resignation of Karen Ras; her appointed replacement, Patricia Mullin, also did not run. Accusations against incumbent Ron Starr led the media to suggest his position was vulnerable.

Voter turnout for the 2018 election was 27%.

== Mayor ==
2022 Mississauga Mayoral election
- October 24, 2022
- Turnout: 21.84%
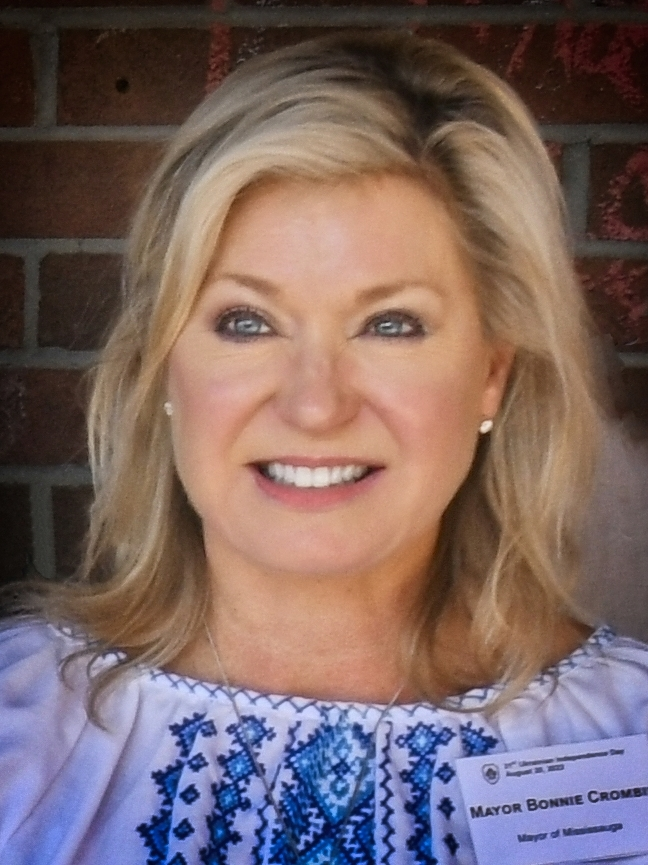
| | | DS | GT |
| Candidate | Bonnie Crombie | David Shaw | George Tavares |
| Popular vote | 82,736 | 7,202 | 5,613 |
| Percentage | 78.47% | 6.83% | 5.32% |
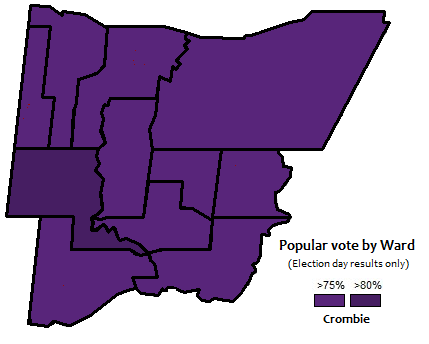
Mayor before election
Bonnie Crombie
Elected mayor
Bonnie Crombie

Bonnie Crombie was the incumbent, and won re-election. She won the 2018 election with 76.68% of the vote.

The only other competitor to place in the double digits was Kevin J. Johnston, who in the months prior to his candidacy been charged by Peel Regional Police for "willfully promoting hatred." (Johnston has since been sentenced to jail in two provinces, and ran for Mayor of Calgary in 2021.)

Crombie launched her campaign on September 7. In 2014, Trivedi was candidate for Mississauga City Council Ward 5.

| Candidate | Vote | % |
|---|---|---|
| Bonnie Crombie (X) | 82,736 | 78.47 |
| David Shaw | 7,202 | 6.83 |
| George Tavares | 5,613 | 5.32 |
| Derek Ramkissoon | 4,012 | 3.81 |
| Mohsin Khan | 2,866 | 2.72 |
| Melodie J. Petty | 1,464 | 1.39 |
| Jayesh Trivedi | 1,169 | 1.11 |
| Bobie Taffe | 370 | 0.35 |

== Council ==
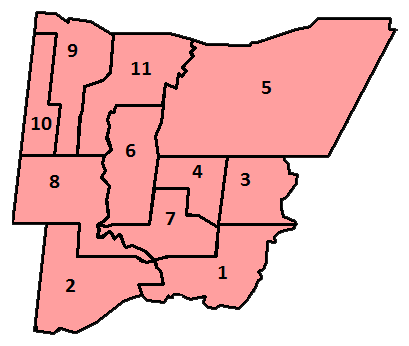
Map of Mississauga's wards

=== Ward 1 ===
Stephen Dasko won in the 2018 election with 47.59% of the vote.

| Candidate | Vote | % |
|---|---|---|
| Stephen Dasko (X) | 5,552 | 70.06 |
| Deborah Goss | 1,602 | 20.21 |
| Andrew Gassmann | 771 | 9.73 |

=== Ward 2 ===
Former Ward 2 councillor Patricia Mullin (1985–2014) was appointed as Ward 2 councillor, February 2. Mullin's appointment was supported by nine of eleven councillors, with Mayor Crombie among those contesting the process of selection.

Mullin's appointment was made after the resignation of Karen Ras in January 2022. Ras revealed in February that her resignation was following a three-year period of her car being keyed, allegedly by fellow councillor Ron Starr. Police did not lay charges, and the city's integrity commissioner refused to investigate.

Ras won the 2018 election with 92.77% of the vote.

Registered candidates

- Gulraiz Bajwa
- Chris Cunningham
- Silvia Gualtieri
- Syed Jaffery
- Reead Rahamut, Green Party of Ontario candidate in the 2022 provincial election
- Sue Shanly
- Ayushe Sharman
- Alvin Tedjo, former Ontario Liberal Party leadership candidate, former MPP candidate

| Candidate | Vote | % |
|---|---|---|
| Alvin Tedjo | 3,733 | 41.12 |
| Sue Shanly | 2,559 | 28.19 |
| Silvia Gualtieri | 1,524 | 16.79 |
| Chris Cunningham | 499 | 5.50 |
| Ayushe Sharman | 464 | 5.11 |
| Syed Jaffery | 148 | 1.63 |
| Gulraiz Bajwa | 131 | 1.44 |
| Reead Rahamut | 20 | 0.22 |

=== Ward 3 ===
Registered candidates

- Chris Fonseca (incumbent)
- Winston Harding, 2014 councillor candidate for Mississauga Ward 1, 2018 councillor candidate for Mississauga Ward 7
- Robert Kielek
- Sarah Szymanski, part-time autoworker and teacher's assistant, running as a candidate for the Municipal Socialist Alliance
- Athina Tagidou
- Robina Yasmeen

| Candidate | Vote | % |
|---|---|---|
| Chris Fonseca (X) | 6,767 | 72.30 |
| Athina Tagidou | 1,535 | 16.40 |
| Sarah Szymanski | 350 | 3.74 |
| Robert Kielek | 287 | 3.07 |
| Winston Harding | 246 | 2.63 |
| Robina Yasmeen | 175 | 1.87 |

=== Ward 4 ===
Registered candidates

- Michelle Bilek
- John Kovac (incumbent)
- Joan Pace Jakobsen, project manager

| Candidate | Vote | % |
|---|---|---|
| John Kovac (X) | 5,748 | 67.82 |
| Joan Pace Jakobsen | 1,642 | 19.37 |
| Michelle Bilek | 1,086 | 12.81 |

=== Ward 5 ===
| Candidate | Vote | % |
|---|---|---|
| Carolyn Parrish (X) | 5,631 | 67.79 |
| Hamid Akbar | 1,006 | 12.11 |
| Domenica Laura Simone | 935 | 11.26 |
| Bradley MacDonald | 735 | 8.85 |

Bob Singh previously appeared on the list of registered candidates; it is presumed that he withdrew. Ahmad Khan withdrew to run for Ward 5 Peel District School Board trustee.

=== Ward 6 ===
The first registered candidate was Joe Horneck. Incumbent Ron Starr sought re-election to a fifth term, amid an unsettled investigation.

Incumbent Ron Starr was in his fourth term on Mississauga council. During the 2018 election, Starr registered to run for Region of Peel Chair — at that point intended to be a directly elected position — leaving his original ward vacant. Faced with a crowded slate of nominees, Starr withdrew that nomination and returned to his original ward. Starr had suggested that the 2018–2022 term might be his last. Starr filed for re-election on June 27.

Between 2019 and 2021, incumbent councillor Ron Starr was alleged to have keyed the car of councillor Karen Ras eight times. Starr has denied that he is the person pictured in the footage. Ras filed a complaint into the matter, but police did not lay charges, "in consultation with the complainant and the Crown's office." Ras asked the City integrity commissioner Robert Swayze to investigate it as a violation of the council's code of conduct, however the code prevented investigation of possibly criminal acts. According to Ras, Mayor Crombie declined to address the issue. As a result, Ras resigned in January 2022, taking a job elsewhere. After Ras later revealed details of the issue to the media, Mississauga City Council held an "hour-long" closed meeting, resulting in a motion to ask the integrity commissioner to investigate, and asking Starr to take a leave of absence.

| Candidate | Vote | % |
|---|---|---|
| Joe Horneck | 7,085 | 60.24 |
| Ron Starr (X) | 2,970 | 25.25 |
| Muhammad Kamil | 1,707 | 14.51 |

Sachin Ryan Kharbanda previously appeared on the list of candidates; Kharbanda has withdrawn.

=== Ward 7 ===
Incumbent Dipika Damerla ran unsuccessfully for provincial office, during the previous term, receiving criticism for taking a leave of absence.

Additional candidates included Leslie Zurek-Silvestri, former Art Gallery of Mississauga president. An unreleased third-party investigation found her involved in "psychological harassment of others" and "workplace violence," which led to a series of events culminating in her being banned from Mississauga City Hall.

Registered candidates

- Amir Ali
- Ranjit Chahal, 2000 Mississauga Ward 5 council candidate, 2010 Mississauga mayoral candidate
- Dipika Damerla (incumbent)
- Mark Freeland, construction worker and unionist, candidate from the Municipal Socialist Alliance
- Iain McCallum
- Maisa Salhia, freelance marketing consultant
- Leslie Zurek-Silvestri

| Candidate | Vote | % |
|---|---|---|
| Dipika Damerla (X) | 4,969 | 55.24 |
| Leslie Zurek-Silvestri | 1,981 | 22.02 |
| Amir Ali | 658 | 7.32 |
| Mark Freeland | 580 | 6.45 |
| Iain McCallum | 369 | 4.10 |
| Maisa Salhia | 310 | 3.45 |
| Ranjit Chahal | 128 | 1.42 |

=== Ward 8 ===
Councillor Matt Mahoney was the incumbent.

In 2018, Mahoney was unopposed until the final week of the nomination period.

Registered candidates

- Irfan Farooq
- Matt Mahoney (incumbent)
- Rahul Mehta

| Candidate | Vote | % |
|---|---|---|
| Matt Mahoney (X) | 8,002 | 80.31 |
| Rahul Mehta | 1,174 | 11.78 |
| Irfan Farooq | 788 | 7.91 |

=== Ward 9 ===
Incumbent Pat Saito announced plans to retire by at least January 2019, offering to mentor those interested in becoming a candidate. In 2018, Saito was unopposed until the final week of the nomination period.

Martin Reid received the endorsement of Saito.

Syed Jaffery was previously registered, but withdrew.

Registered candidates

- Chacko Athanasius
- Isaiah Bryant
- Scott E. W. Chapman, 2014 and 2018 candidate for Mayor of Mississauga
- Nokha Dakroub, Peel District School Board trustee
- Bob Delaney, Member of Provincial Parliament from 2003 to 2018
- Frank Fang
- Len Little, restaurant owner, 2014 candidate for city councillor Ward 9, 2022 MPP candidate for Mississauga-Streetsville (None of the Above Party)
- Peter McCallion
- Nicholas Rabba, 2022 MPP candidate for Mississauga-Streetsville (Ontario NDP)
- Martin Reid
- Mohammad Shabbeer

Charbel Bassil was a candidate, but withdrew to run for French separate school trustee. Jacob Chacko was previously on the list.

| Candidate | Vote | % |
|---|---|---|
| Martin Reid | 2,793 | 26.00 |
| Nokha Dakroub | 2,552 | 23.76 |
| Bob Delaney | 1,318 | 12.27 |
| Frank Fang | 1,034 | 9.62 |
| Len Little | 998 | 9.29 |
| Peter McCallion | 636 | 5.92 |
| Mohammad Shabbeer | 584 | 5.44 |
| Nicholas Rabba | 568 | 5.29 |
| Isaiah Bryant | 124 | 1.15 |
| Chacko Athanasius | 84 | 0.78 |
| Scott E.W. Chapman | 52 | 0.48 |

=== Ward 10 ===
Mississauga News sent a survey to all candidates, and all replied.

Registered candidates

- Hamza Bajwa
- Brennan Bempong, former orthopedic technician
- Khalid Mahmood, realtor
- Sue McFadden (incumbent)

| Candidate | Vote | % |
|---|---|---|
| Sue McFadden (X) | 6,960 | 61.04 |
| Brennan Bempong | 3,297 | 28.92 |
| Hamza Bajwa | 937 | 8.22 |
| Khalid Mahmood | 208 | 1.82 |

=== Ward 11 ===
Incumbent councillor George Carlson has retired from the ward. He endorsed Brad Butt.

Of the candidates, Imran Hasan twice ran to unseat George Carlson. In 2014, he came second with 17.2% to Carlson's 68.2%, and second in 2018 with 22.1% to Carlson's 69.0%.

Registered candidates

- Brad Butt, former Conservative MP for Mississauga—Streetsville
- Annurag Chawla, real estate broker
- Kulbir Gill, transit operations supervisor
- Imran Hasan, 2014 and 2018 city council candidate for Ward 11, non-profit volunteer
- Brian Rylance
- Kushagr Dutt Sharma

| Candidate | Vote | % |
|---|---|---|
| Brad Butt | 3,864 | 41.19 |
| Imran Hasan | 2,337 | 24.91 |
| Kulbir Gill | 1,370 | 14.60 |
| Kushagr Dutt Sharma | 850 | 9.06 |
| Annurag Chawla | 675 | 7.20 |
| Brian Rylance | 285 | 3.04 |
