= Mississauga East—Cooksville =

Mississauga East—Cooksville may refer to:

- Mississauga East—Cooksville (federal electoral district)
- Mississauga East—Cooksville (provincial electoral district)
