= Alvin Tedjo =

Mayor of Mississauga since 2026

His Worship Alvin Tedjo
- 鄭小平
- Tedjo in 2024

8th Mayor of Mississauga
- Incumbent
- Assumed office November 16, 2026
- Preceded by: Carolyn Parrish

Mississauga City Councillor
- In office 2022–2026
- Succeeded by: Tom Ellard
- Constituency: Ward 2 (Clarkson and Lorne Park)

Personal details
- Born: 1982 or 1983 (age 43–44)
- Citizenship: Canada
- Party: Independent
- Other political affiliations: Ontario Liberal Party
- Spouse: Rebecca Geroux
- Children: 3
- Parents: Anto Tedjo (father); Angela Tedjo (mother)
- Education: Queen's University (BA); Harvard University (ALM)
- Awards: King Charles III Coronation Medal
- Website: alvintedjo.ca

Alvin Tedjo (Hokkien: 鄭小平 or POJ: Tē Siáu Pêng) (born 1982 or 1983) is a Canadian politician who has served as the eighth mayor of Mississauga since November 15, 2026. Previously, he served on Mississauga City Council as the councillor for Ward 2, and as a member of Peel Regional Council. (Note: All council members of the City of Mississauga are ex-officio members of the regional council.) Tedjo was the runner-up in the 2024 Mississauga mayoral by-election, and was elected mayor in the 2026 municipal election.

== Private life ==
Tedjo was born to Chinese Indonesian parents who immigrated from Indonesia and settled in Mississauga when Tedjo was four years old. He attended Father Michael Goetz Secondary School where he served as student council president for two years.

He completed his Bachelor of Arts (BA) in political science at Queen's University, and obtained a Master of Liberal Arts (ALM) in digital media design from Harvard Extension School.

Tedjo and his wife have three children.

== Political career ==
=== As ministerial aide and provincial electoral candidate ===
Following the completion of undergraduate studies, Tedjo worked for the Ontario Undergraduate Student Alliance (OUSA), a student advocacy organization in which the Alma Mater Society of Queen's University was a member. Tedjo made the jump to Queen’s Park and worked as a senior aide to four successive higher education ministers – Glen Murray, John Milloy, Brad Duguid and Reza Moridi. He later worked for Sheridan College and Toronto Metropolitan University in various public affairs roles.

During the 2018 Ontario general election, Tedjo carried the Ontario Liberal banner in the electoral district of Oakville North—Burlington. Since all Mississauga seats were held by Liberals incumbents prior to that election, he accepted the nomination in Oakville North—Burlington, a new district and the only one in Halton or Peel region without a Liberal incumbent. The 2018 election, the most disastrous campaign for the Liberals in Ontario history, saw no Liberal returned west of Toronto. (Note: In 2018 the Ontario Liberals won only 7 seats – 3 in Toronto, 3 in Ottawa, and 1 in Thunder Bay.) Locally, the NDP candidate pushed Tedjo to a third-place finish by nine votes out of more than fifty thousand.

Tedjo was a contestant at the 2020 Ontario Liberal leadership convention. His campaign was endorsed by the late Walt Elliot, a Peterson era MPP who represented the district Tedjo contested in 2018, and by Progressive Conservative Senator Hugh Segal, along with a number of municipal leaders. Campaigning on a platform for basic income and inclusive growth, Tedjo was noted for sharing his allotted speaking time at the convention with a robot to highlight various key rationales for his platform. Former cabinet minister Steven Del Duca won that contest on the first ballot, during which Tedjo placed fifth in a field of six.

=== Mississauga City Council ===
Tedjo secured his first electoral victory for public office during the 2022 municipal election. The seat for Ward 2, which covers the neighbourhood of Clarkson and Lorne Park was an open seat as incumbent councillor Karen Ras had resigned earlier in the year after enduring repeated workplace harassment and intimidation by another councillor. In a field of eight that included Silvia Gualtieri, later elected MPP for nearby Mississauga East-Cooksville in 2025, Tedjo secured victory with 41% of the votes.

In June 2023, Mississauga mayor Bonnie Crombie launched her bid for the Ontario Liberal leadership, and resigned as mayor in January 2024 upon being elected as leader. Tedjo joined three other council colleagues – Dipika Damerla, Stephen Dasko, and winner Carolyn Parrish – and contested the mayoral by-election. The contest provided a unique opportunity for sitting councillors to contest the mayoralty without having to relinquish their council seats should they not be successful. His campaign was noted for tackling housing density, higher order public transit and other urban issues often sidestepped by suburban municipal politicians. He was endorsed by three of his council peers (out of seven who were not candidates) and two trustees (out of six) of the Peel District School Board. He placed second with 25% of the votes against 31% secured by winner Parrish.

=== Mayor of Mississauga ===
Tejdo declared his intention to seek the mayoral again in the 2026 municipal election in April that year, and registered his candidacy on the first day nomination was open. He secured an upset victory in a contest where media attention primarily focused on the acrimony between his two predecessors, incumbent Carolyn Parrish and former mayor Bonnie Crombie. He is the first person of Indonesian descent to be elected mayor of a Canadian city.

== Electoral record ==
=== Ontario Provincial ===
==== 2018 Ontario election, Oakville North—Burlington ====
2018 Ontario general election: Oakville North—Burlington
Party	Candidate	Votes	%	±%	Expenditures
Progressive Conservative	Effie Triantafilopoulos	25,691	46.41	+9.60	$63,206
New Democratic	Saima Zaidi	13,496	24.38	+12.64	$4,724
Liberal	Alvin Tedjo	13,487	24.37	–21.77	$29,863
Green	Marianne Workman	2,052	3.71	+0.33	$81
Libertarian	Charles Zach	403	0.73	–	none listed
Trillium	Frank De Luca	222	0.40	–	none listed
Total valid votes		55,351	99.39		
Total rejected, unmarked and declined ballots		342	0.61		
Turnout		55,693	60.20		
Eligible voters		92,512			
Progressive Conservative notional gain from Liberal		Swing		+15.69	
Source: Elections Ontario

==== 2020 Ontario Liberal Party leadership election ====
Candidate	Delegate Elected		First (final) ballot	
Steven Del Duca	1,172	56.2%	1,258	58.8%
Michael Coteau	370	17.8%	363	16.9%
Kate Graham	273	13.1%	299	13.9%
Mitzie Hunter	130	6.2%	122	5.7%
Alvin Tedjo	72	3.4%	74	3.5%
Brenda Hollingsworth	25	1.2%	24	1.1%
Independent	42	2.0%		
Total	2084		2140	

There was one spoiled ballot.

=== City of Mississauga ===
==== 2022 Mississauga municipal election, Ward 2 Councillor ====
Candidate	Vote	%
Alvin Tedjo	3,733	41.12
Sue Shanly	2,559	28.19
Silvia Gualtieri	1,524	16.79
Chris Cunningham	499	5.50
Ayushe Sharman	464	5.11
Syed Jaffery	148	1.63
Gulraiz Bajwa	131	1.44
Reead Rahamut	20	0.22
Total	9,078	

==== 2024 Mississauga mayoral by-election ====
2024 Mississauga mayoral by-election, June 10, 2024 Resignation of Bonnie Crombie
Candidate	Popular vote			Expenditures
Candidate	Votes	%	±%	Expenditures
Carolyn Parrish	43,494	31.06	–	$524,816.30
Alvin Tedjo	35,005	25.00	–	$300,278.25
Dipika Damerla	27,119	19.37	–	$576,469.83
Stephen Dasko	22,408	16.00	–	$291,998.83
David Shaw	2,843	2.03	-6.80	$4,511.51
Brian Crombie	2,242	1.60	–	$9,888.92
Frank Fang	1,694	1.21	–	$17,269.65
George Tavares	962	0.69	-4.63	$163.42
Xiao Hua Gong	598	0.43	–	$45,166.50
Diya Atassi	545	0.39	–	$8,522.66
Zulfiqar Ali	528	0.38	–	$971.23
Mike Matulewicz	424	0.30	–	none listed
Sinisa Mandrapa	417	0.30	–	$25,534.00
Sara Iqbal	359	0.26	–	$0.00
Jamie Dookie	302	0.22	–	$846.00
Nathalie Xian Yi Yan	297	0.21	–	$1,200.00
Mitchell MacEachern	238	0.17	–	$0.00
Winston Harding	206	0.15	–	$1,575.00
Mohsin Khan	170	0.12	–	$0.00
Syed Jaffery	169	0.12	–	$8,116.00
Total valid votes	140,020	99.89		
Rejected, unmarked and declined	161	0.11		
Turnout	140,181	25.67	+3.83	
Eligible voters	545,512			
Note: Candidate campaign colours are based on the prominent colour used in campaign items (signs, literature, etc.) or colours used in polling graphs and are used as a visual differentiation between candidates.
Sources: City of Mississauga

==== 2026 Mississauga mayoral election ====
2026 Mississauga municipal election - Mayor (unofficial)
Candidate	Votes	%	(Note: Relative to 2024 byelection)
Alvin Tedjo	74,479	39.21	14.21 ▲
Carolyn Parrish	51,853	27.30	3.76 ▼
Bonnie Crombie	43,191	22.74	–
Dipika Damerla	11,500	6.05	13.32 ▼
Frank Fang	1,822	0.96	0.25 ▼
David Shaw	1,587	0.84	1.19 ▼
Mike Matulewicz	1,188	0.63	0.33 ▲
Karam Ahmed	1,058	0.56	–
Gord Elliott	876	0.46	–
Aamir Bhatti	604	0.32	–
Ana Luisa Vasquez de Espinal	560	0.29	–
Amjad Jilani	537	0.28	–
Mohsin Khan	388	0.20	0.08 ▲
Fadi Naami	311	0.16	–
Total	189,954		
