= Clarkson Village =

Clarkson Village is the name of three places, one in Canada and two in the United States:

- Clarkson Village is in Mississauga, Ontario
- Clarkson Village is in Monroe County, New York
- Clarkson Village is in Orleans County, New York.
