= Cooksville, Mississauga =

Cooksville
- Neighbourhood
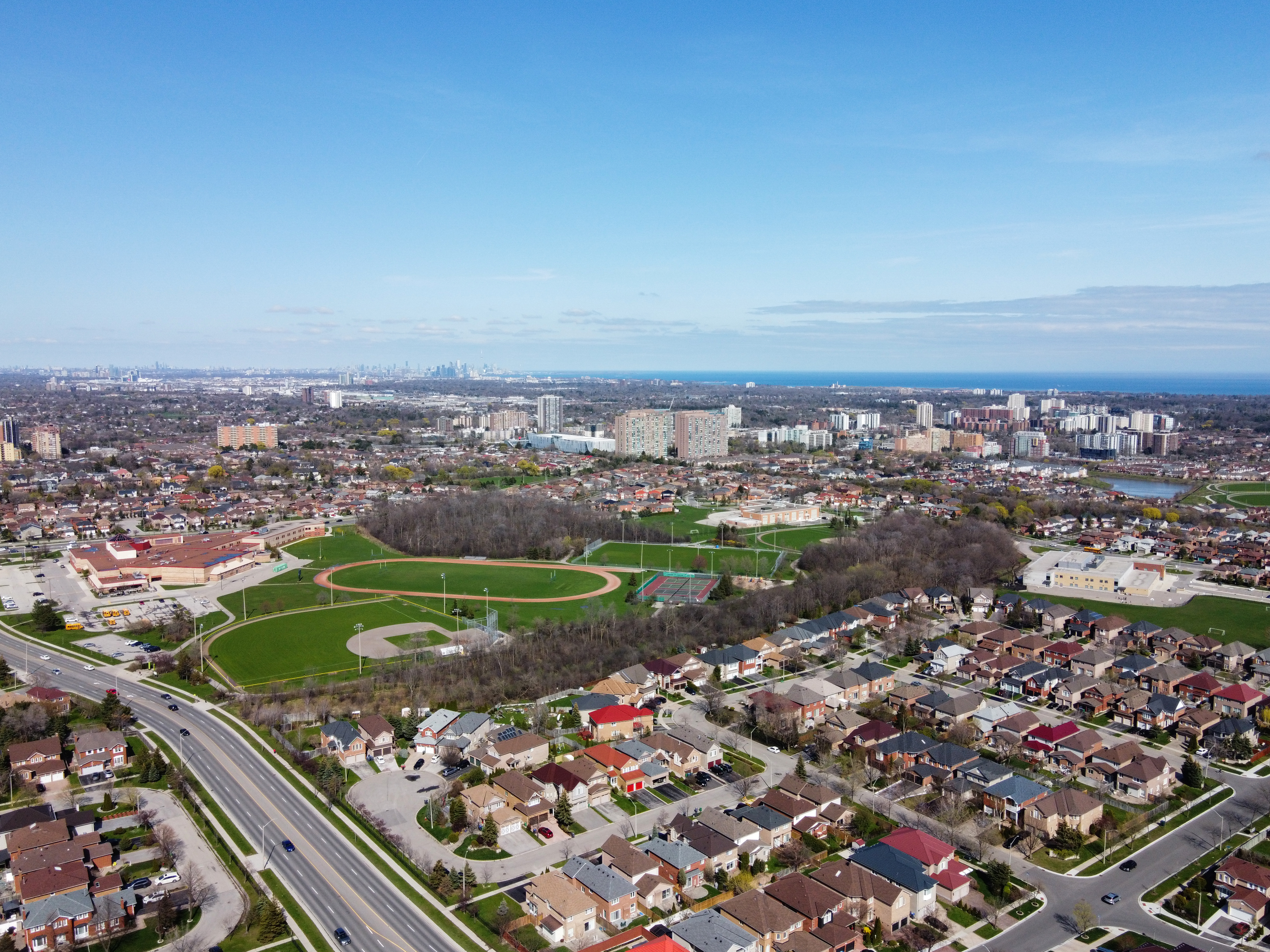
- Aerial view of Cooksville
- Nickname(s): "Five and Ten"
- Interactive map of Cooksville
- Country: Canada
- Province: Ontario
- Regional Municipality: Peel
- City: Mississauga
- Founded: 1807 as hamlet (Harrisville)
- Present name: 1836
- Changed Division: 1974 Peel Region from Peel County
- Changed Municipality: 1968 Mississauga from Toronto Township (as Town); 1974 (as City)

Government
  - MP: Peter Fonseca (Mississauga East—Cooksville)
  - MPP: Silvia Gualtieri (Mississauga East—Cooksville)
  - Councillors: Lucas Alves (Ward 7)

Population (2016)
  - Total: 36,000
- Postal codes: L5A, L5B

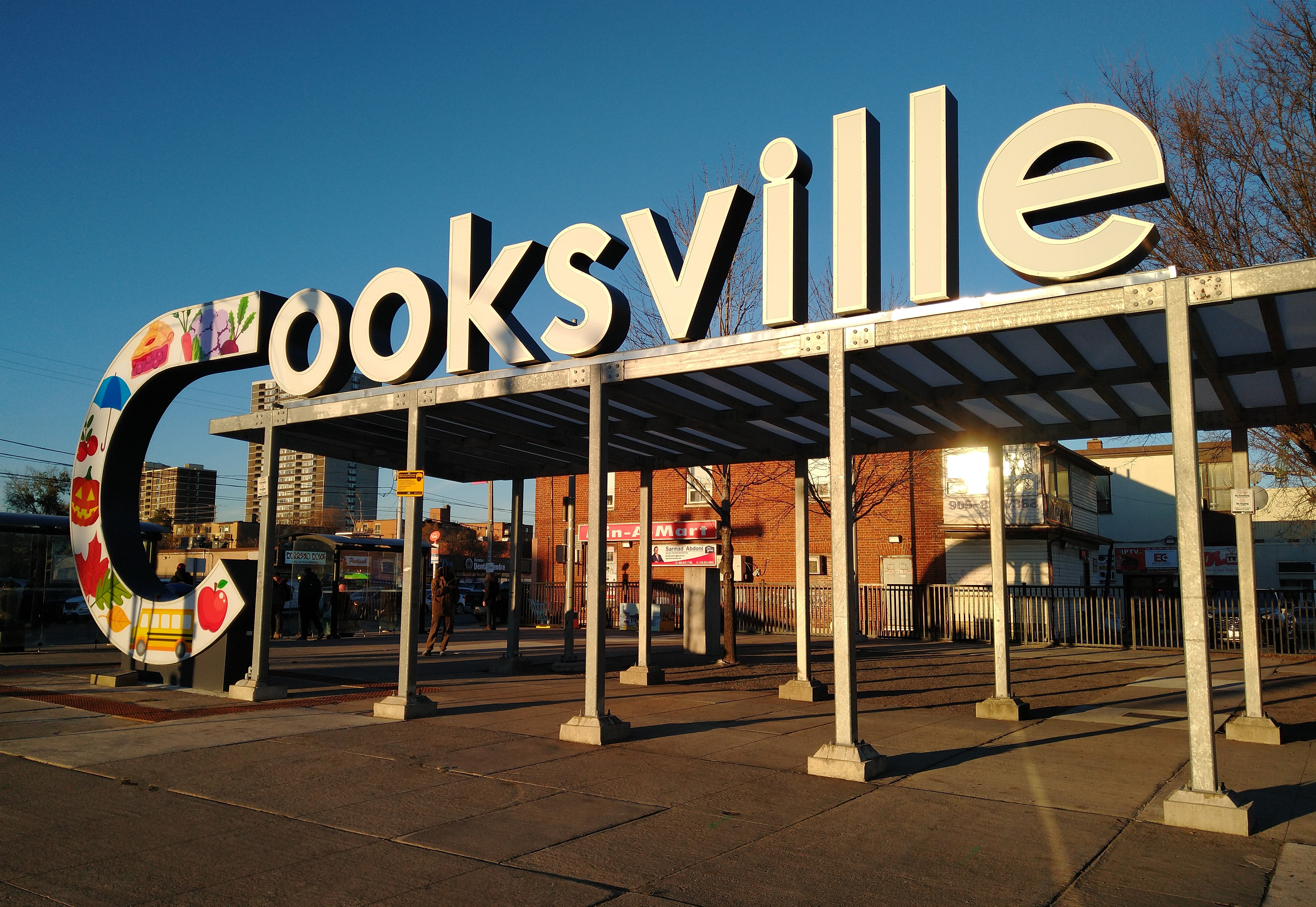
The Cooksville sign at the intersection of Dundas and Hurontario Streets.

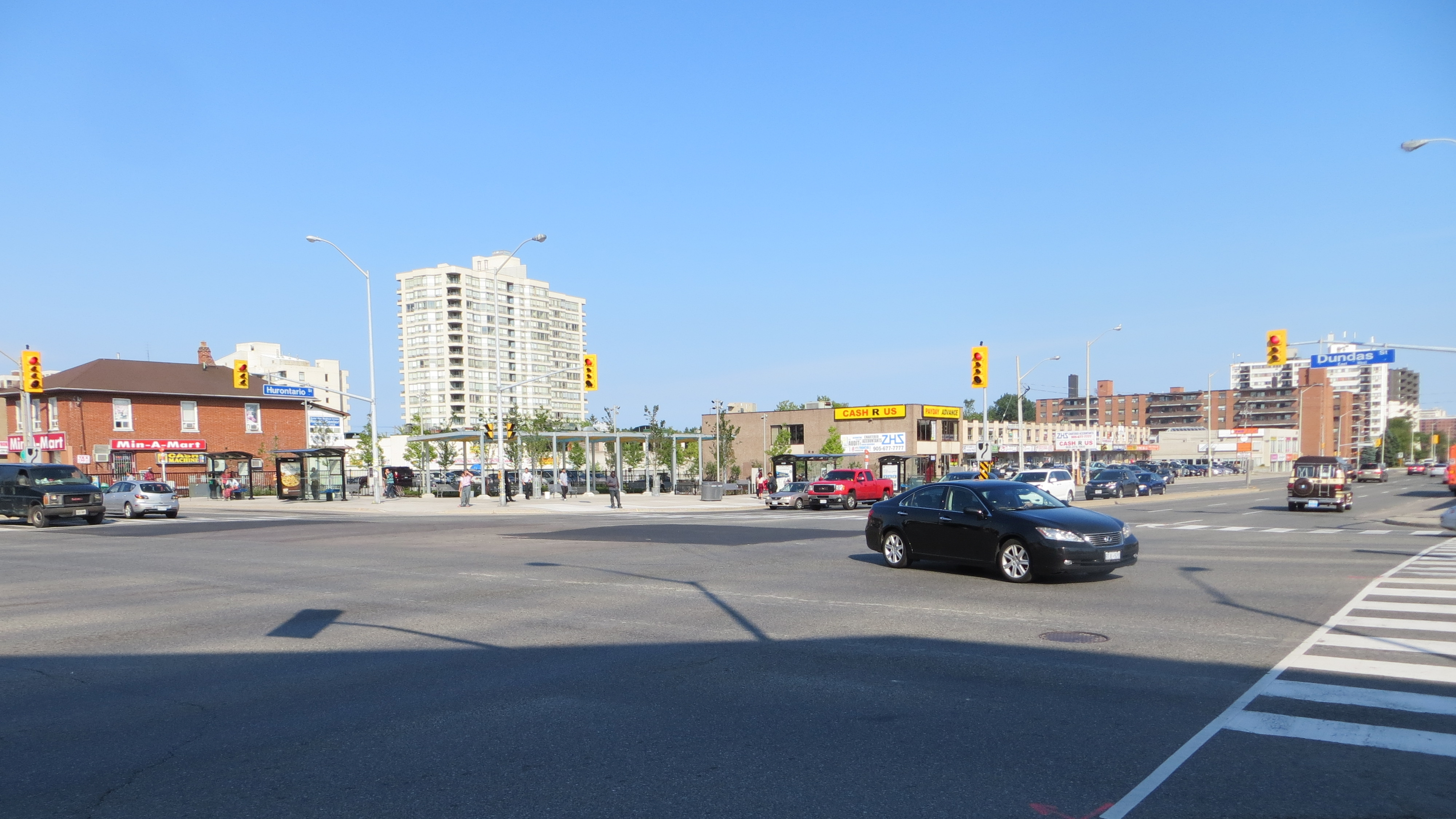
At the original corners of the settlement, Dundas Street and Hurontario Street, looking south-east (the McClelland-Copeland building seen in the left of the image)

Cooksville is a neighbourhood in Mississauga in the Greater Toronto Area region of Ontario, Canada. It is centred around the intersection of Dundas Street and Hurontario Street near the eponymous Cooksville Creek.

== History ==
Cooksville was originally located in Toronto Township, and was an important stagecoach stop along the Dundas highway, which was carved out of the wilderness after a survey by Asa Danforth Jr. in 1798.

The settlement was originally named Harrisville in honour of Daniel Harris, Cooksville's first settler, who immigrated from the United States in 1807. Later in 1836, the settlement was renamed to the present name Cooksville after Jacob Cook.

The entrepreneur, Jacob Cook, won the contract to deliver mail from York to Niagara, operated several stage coach lines, was the local magistrate and built the Cooksville House, the first licensed tavern in the area at the northwest corner of Dundas and Hurontario streets in 1829. A heritage Mississauga sign on Hurontario Street north of the intersection claims it was the first Canadian location of winemaking in 1836.

Cooksville grew in size and influence until the Great Fire of 1852 razed much of it. That year, the McClelland-Copeland General store opened and is now the areas longest surviving building. A severe tornado hit the area on June 24, 1923, destroying mostly rural farmhouses around the town. On the west side of the town there was a 182 acre brickyard that sprawled south of the CP rail line from 1912 until its closure in 1995, employing many Cooksville residents over that period. The Italian Heavyweight champion boxer, Primo Carnera had worked at the yard for a short period during his youth. Today, the redeveloped site is a medium density residential and retail zone along Shoreline Dr., just south of the infamous 1979 Mississauga train derailment site at the CP crossing (Mavis Road).

Cooksville was the residence of HIH Grand Duchess Olga Alexandrovna of Russia while in exile in Canada.

Although never incorporated and not being the city's largest historic community, its central crossroads location meant much of the early suburban growth in Mississauga (Toronto Township before 1967) occurred in the area around Cooksville. For much of that time it had the highest concentration of high-rise condominium and rental buildings in Mississauga, and was originally proposed to be the location of Mississauga's city centre. However, lobbying by prominent developer Bruce McLaughlin to build a new municipal office after a fire in 1969 badly damaged the original township hall and the opening of Square One Shopping Centre to the north, resulted in the city centre overtaking it in density.

In the late 20th and 21st century, Cooksville became a hub for South Asian and West Indian shops and cuisine and other services for the immigrant population. In 2025, transit-oriented development projects of up to 3,000 units beside Cooksville GO and the upcoming Hurontatio LRT has been proposed.

== Transportation ==
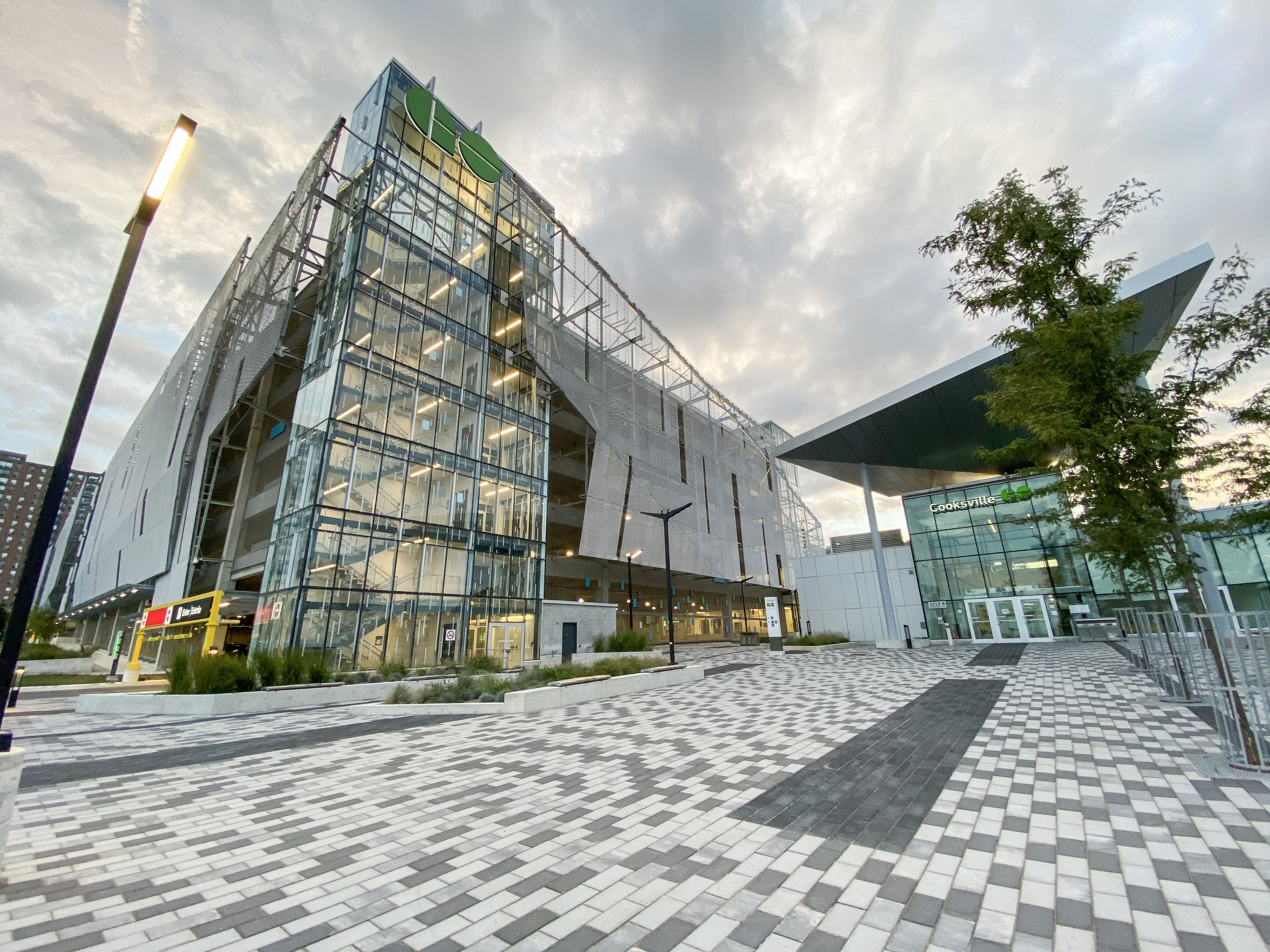
Cooksville GO Station

Cooksville is a main transportation hub in Mississauga, with GO Transit rail, and bus service; and express city buses to Toronto's Union Station. Cooksville GO Station is just north of the intersection of Dundas and Hurontario Streets.

Dundas Street, a four-lane street; and Hurontario Street, a six-lane street, are the main thoroughfares in Cooksville, and intersect at the heart of the neighbourhood. The intersection was the junction of former provincial Highway 5 and Highway 10, and is, likely due to the City of Mississauga's relatively recent history and force of habit, still often colloquially referred to by Mississaugans as "Five and Ten" in reference to those street's previous highway numbers; 5 for Dundas and 10 for Hurontario. "Highway 10" is also commonly used in lieu of Hurontario as a whole through Mississauga, while the use of "Highway 5" for Dundas is more confined to the intersection itself, and "Dundas and Ten (or Ten and Dundas)" is also common. The future Hurontario LRT (Hazel McCallion Line) is set to run through Cooksville, however the long and delayed construction process has led to business revenue declines including business closures due to the impacts of continuous construction.

== Demographics ==
According to the Canada 2016 Census (Note: The figures were calculated using Cooksville NHD (East), Cooksville NHD (West), and DT Cooksville.)

Ethnic Groups
Ethnicity	Population	Percentage
Total	33,200	100
White	16,705	50.3
South Asian	6,380	19.2
Filipino	2,005	6.0
Black	1,735	5.2
Chinese	1,405	4.2
Arab	1,305	3.9
Southeast Asian	820	2.4
Latin American	804	2.4
West Asian	615	1.8
Korean	335	1.0
Japanese	55	0.1
Not Included Elsewhere	430	1.2
Multiple	570	1.7

There is a plethora of South Asian and Arab textile/clothing shops, restaurants, and grocery stores in the area. There is also a significant number of Afro-Caribbean take-out restaurants and barber shops; the area is known to cater towards Mississauga's black community because of the large number of barber shops in close proximity to one another. Nevertheless, the area is multicultural and most cultures are represented in the area.

The census tracts for the area, include three separate neighbourhood designations by the City of Mississauga: Cooksville NHD (Neighbourhood), DT Cooksville (Downtown) and DT Hospital (site of the Mississauga Hospital). The area in the southwest part of Cooksville, closer to the Credit River, is a more exclusive enclave of mostly large, detached homes on larger, treed lots; is referred to as Gordon Woods. Fairview is sometimes considered to be part of Cooksville, but is actually a separate neighbourhood located north of the CPKC rail line.
