= Mississauga City Council =

Municipal governing body of Mississauga, Canada

Coordinates: 43.58882°N 79.64406°W

- Coat of arms of Mississauga

Type
- Type: Lower-tier city council
- Term limits: None

History
- New session started: November 16, 2026

Leadership
- Mayor (head of council): Alvin Tedjo

Structure
- Seats: 12 (mayor + 11 councillors)
- Length of term: 4 years
- Authority: Municipal Act
- Salary: $187,057 (mayor) $92,831.74 (councillor) (plus benefit)

Elections
- Last election: October 26, 2026 (12 seats)

Meeting place
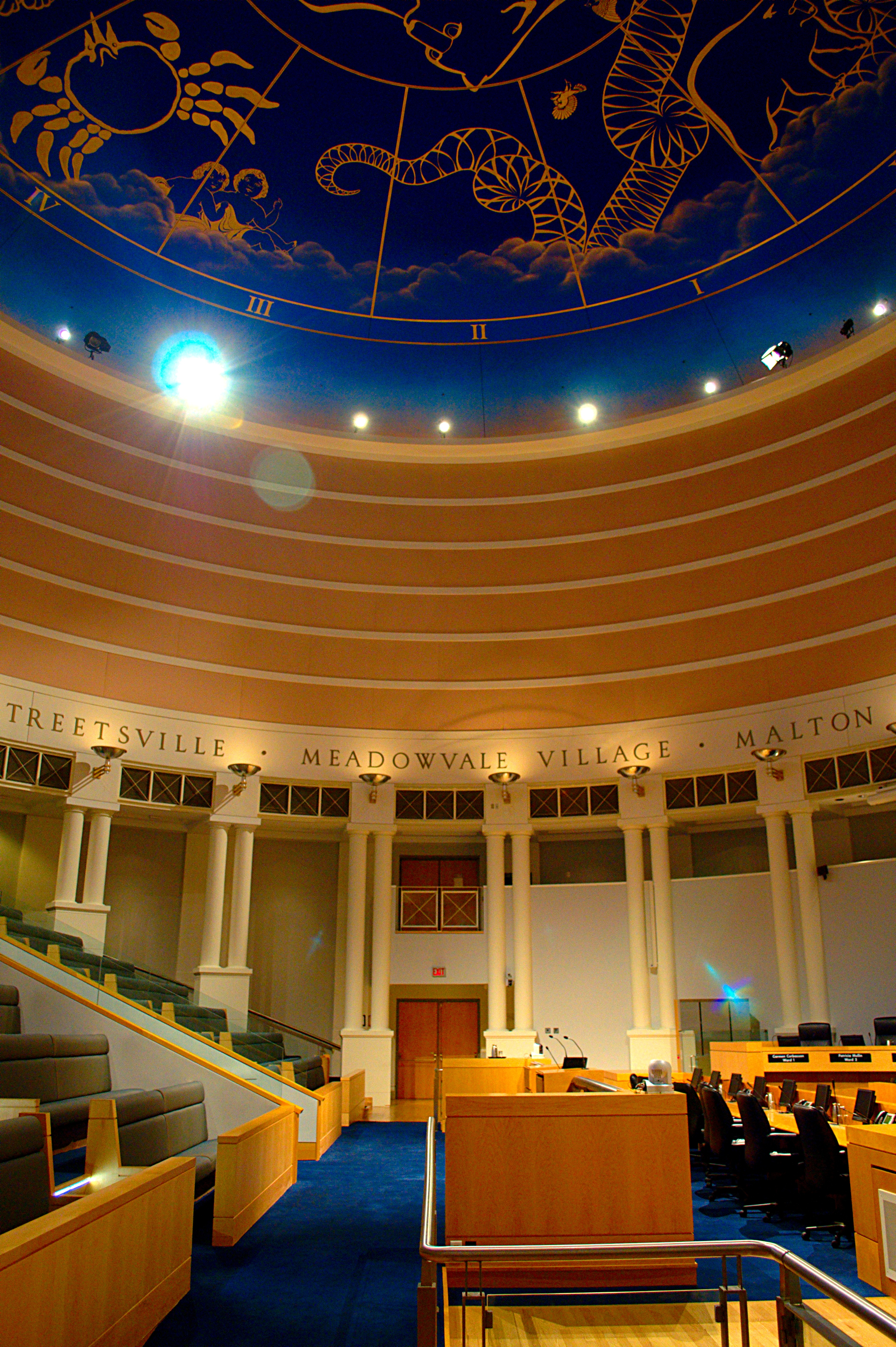
- Council Chamber; Mississauga Civic Centre; Mississauga, Ontario

Website
- mississauga.ca/council

Mississauga City Council is the governing body of the city of Mississauga, Ontario, Canada. The council consists of the mayor and 11 councillors elected to serve a four-year term. The most recent general municipal election was held on October 26, 2026. The newly elected council's session began on November 16, 2026. All members of council, including the mayor, are also simultaneously members of Peel Regional Council.

== 2026–2030 ==
Council elected in the 2026 municipal election

Councillor	Ward	Notes
Alvin Tedjo	Mayor	
Stephen Dasko	Ward 1 (Port Credit, Lakeview)	
Tom Ellard	Ward 2 (Clarkson, Lorne Park)	
Chris Fonseca	Ward 3 (Rathwood, Applewood)	
John Kovac	Ward 4 (City Centre)	
Natalie Hart	Ward 5 (Britannia Woods, Malton)	
Joe Horneck	Ward 6 (Erindale)	
Lucas Alves	Ward 7 (Cooksville)	
Matt Mahoney	Ward 8 (Erin Mills)	
Martin Reid	Ward 9 (Meadowvale)	
Sue McFadden	Ward 10 (Lisgar, Churchill Meadows)	
Brad Butt	Ward 11 (Streetsville)	

== 2022–2026 ==
Council elected in the 2022 municipal election and subsequent by-elections.

Councillor	Ward	Notes
Bonnie Crombie	Mayor	to Jan. 12, 2024 (Note: Resigned on January 12, 2024 following being elected leader of the Ontario Liberal Party in December 2023.)
Carolyn Parrish	Mayor	from June 24, 2024
Stephen Dasko	Ward 1 (Port Credit, Lakeview)	
Alvin Tedjo	Ward 2 (Clarkson, Lorne Park)	
Chris Fonseca	Ward 3 (Rathwood, Applewood)	
John Kovac	Ward 4 (City Centre)	
Carolyn Parrish	Ward 5 (Britannia Woods, Malton)	to March 15, 2024 (Note: Resigned on March 15, 2024 to run as a candidate in the mayoral by-election.)
Natalie Hart	Ward 5 (Britannia Woods, Malton)	From June 24, 2024
Joe Horneck	Ward 6 (Erindale)	
Dipika Damerla	Ward 7 (Cooksville)	
Matt Mahoney	Ward 8 (Erin Mills)	Deputy mayor (Note: from June 27, 2024.)
Martin Reid	Ward 9 (Meadowvale)	
Sue McFadden	Ward 10 (Lisgar, Churchill Meadows)	
Brad Butt	Ward 11 (Streetsville)	

== 2018–2022 ==
Council elected in the 2018 municipal election.

Councillor	Ward	Notes
Bonnie Crombie	Mayor	
Stephen Dasko	Ward 1 (Port Credit, Lakeview)	
Karen Ras	Ward 2 (Clarkson, Lorne Park)	To Jan. 2022 (Note: Resigned on January 28, 2022 due to alleged workplace harassment from Ward 6 Councillor Ron Starr)
Patricia Mullin	Ward 2 (Clarkson, Lorne Park)	From Feb. 7, 2022 (Note: Appointed by Council on February 3, 2022 to fill the Ward 2 office vacancy for a term beginning February 7, 2022 and ending November 14, 2022.)
Chris Fonseca	Ward 3 (Rathwood, Applewood)	
John Kovac	Ward 4 (City Centre)	
Carolyn Parrish	Ward 5 (Britannia Woods, Malton)	
Ron Starr	Ward 6 (Erindale)	
Dipika Damerla	Ward 7 (Cooksville)	
Matt Mahoney	Ward 8 (Erin Mills)	
Pat Saito	Ward 9 (Meadowvale)	
Sue McFadden	Ward 10 (Lisgar, Churchill Meadows)	
George Carlson	Ward 11 (Streetsville)	

== 2014–2018 ==
Council elected in the 2014 municipal election and subsequent by-elections:

Councillor	Ward	Notes
Bonnie Crombie	Mayor	
Jim Tovey	Ward 1 (Port Credit, Lakeview)	To Jan. 15, 2018 (Note: Died in office on January 15, 2018)
David Cook	Ward 1 (Port Credit, Lakeview)	From Feb. 2018 (Note: Appointed as replacement by Council on February 21, 2018)
Karen Ras	Ward 2 (Clarkson, Lorne Park)	
Chris Fonseca	Ward 3 (Rathwood, Applewood)	
Frank Dale	Ward 4 (City Centre)	To 2014 (Note: Resigned in 2014 when he was appointed Chair of the Regional Municipality of Peel)
John Kovac	Ward 4 (City Centre)	From April 27, 2015 (Note: Won by-election on April 27, 2015.)
Carolyn Parrish	Ward 5 (Britannia Woods, Malton)	
Ron Starr	Ward 6 (Erindale)	
Nando Iannicca	Ward 7 (Cooksville)	
Matt Mahoney	Ward 8 (Erin Mills)	
Pat Saito	Ward 9 (Meadowvale)	
Sue McFadden	Ward 10 (Lisgar, Churchill Meadows)	
George Carlson	Ward 11 (Streetsville)	

== 2010–2014 ==
Council elected in the 2010 municipal election and subsequent by-elections:

Councillor	Ward	Notes
Hazel McCallion	Mayor	
Jim Tovey	Ward 1 (Port Credit, Lakeview)	
Patricia Mullin	Ward 2 (Clarkson, Lorne Park)	
Chris Fonseca	Ward 3 (Rathwood, Applewood)	
Frank Dale	Ward 4 (City Centre)	
Eve Adams	Ward 5 (Britannia Woods, Malton)	To early 2011 (Note: Resigned in early 2011 to run as a Conservative candidate in the 2011 federal election.)
Bonnie Crombie	Ward 5 (Britannia Woods, Malton)	From Sept. 19, 2011 (Note: Won by-election on September 19, 2011.)
Ron Starr	Ward 6 (Erindale)	
Nando Iannicca	Ward 7 (Cooksville)	
Katie Mahoney	Ward 8 (Erin Mills)	
Pat Saito	Ward 9 (Meadowvale)	
Sue McFadden	Ward 10 (Lisgar, Churchill Meadows)	
George Carlson	Ward 11 (Streetsville)	

== 2006–2010 ==
Council elected in the 2006 municipal election:

Councillor	Ward	Notes
Hazel McCallion	Mayor	
Carmen Corbasson	Ward 1 (Port Credit)	
Patricia Mullin	Ward 2 (Clarkson, Lorne Park)	
Maja Prentice	Ward 3 (Rathwood, Applewood)	
Frank Dale	Ward 4 (City Centre)	
Eve Adams	Ward 5 (Britannia Woods, Malton)	
Carolyn Parrish	Ward 6 (Erindale)	
Nando Iannicca	Ward 7 (Cooksville)	
Katie Mahoney	Ward 8 (Erin Mills)	
Pat Saito	Ward 9 (Meadowvale)	
Sue McFadden	Ward 10 (Lisgar, Churchill Meadows)	
George Carlson	Ward 11 (Streetsville)	
