= Equal Parenting Party =

- Defunct provincial party
- Founded: 2014
- Dissolved: 2018
- Headquarters: PO Box 1826; Clinton, Ontario; N0M 1L0
- Ideology: Father's rights
- Colours: Purple

Website
- equalparentingpartyofontario.ca

The Equal Parenting Party was a minor father's rights political party in Ontario, Canada, founded in 2014. The party was described by leader Dennis Valenta as a single-issue party and focused on combating inequality in Ontario family law against fathers in divorce proceedings, especially regarding custody and access to children.

EPP nominated two candidates in the 2014 provincial election, Valenta ran in the riding of Huron—Bruce and Dolly Catena ran in the riding of Mississauga East—Cooksville. Neither candidate gained a seat in the Legislative Assembly of Ontario and the party received 0.01% of the popular vote. The party was deregistered in 2018 and did not contest the 2018 provincial election.

== Election results ==
Election results
Election year	# of overall votes	% of overall total	# of candidates run	# of seats won	+/−	Government
2014	359	0.01	2	0 / 107	New Party	Extra-parliamentary
