= Carolyn Parrish =

Canadian politician (born 1946)

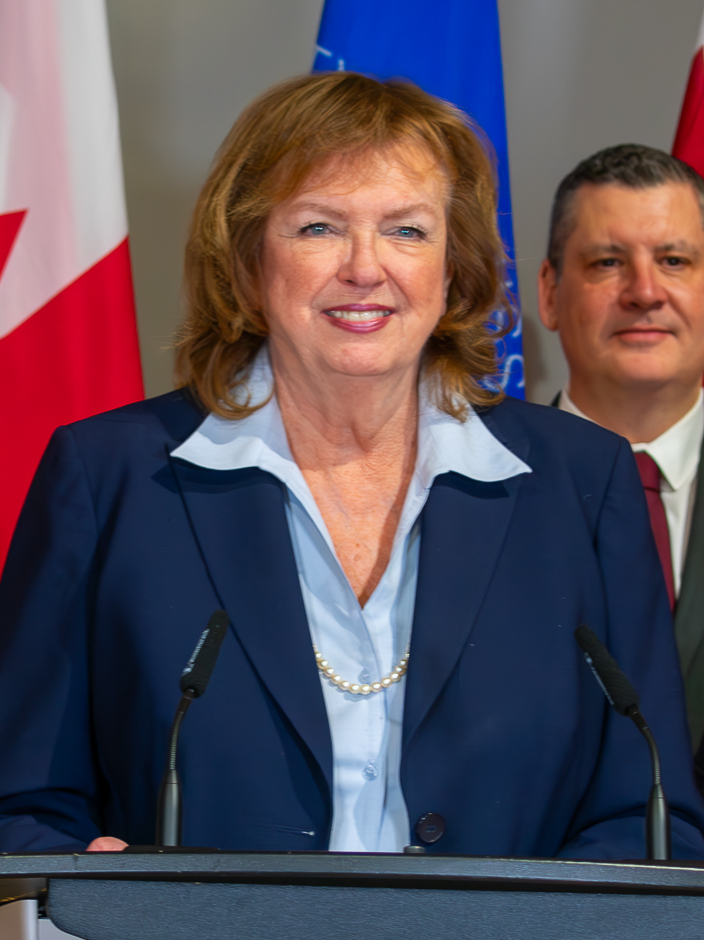
- Parrish in 2025

7th Mayor of Mississauga
- In office June 24, 2024 – November 15, 2026
- Deputy: Matt Mahoney
- Preceded by: Bonnie Crombie
- Succeeded by: Alvin Tedjo

Mississauga City Councillor
- In office December 1, 2014 – March 15, 2024
- Preceded by: Bonnie Crombie
- Succeeded by: Natalie Hart
- Constituency: Ward 5 (Britannia Woods-Malton)
- In office November 14, 2006 – January 1, 2010
- Preceded by: George Carlson
- Succeeded by: Ron Starr
- Constituency: Ward 6 (Erindale)

Member of Parliament for Mississauga—Erindale Mississauga West (1993–1997) Mississauga Centre (1997–2004)
- In office October 25, 1993 – January 22, 2006
- Preceded by: Bob Horner
- Succeeded by: Omar Alghabra

Personal details
- Born: Karolina Janozeski; October 3, 1946 (age 80) Toronto, Ontario, Canada
- Party: Independent
- Other political affiliations: Liberal (1993–2004); Ontario Liberal (2023)
- Relatives: Marsha Canham (sister)
- Education: University of Toronto
- Profession: Teacher, writer

Carolyn Parrish (born Karolina Janozeski; October 3, 1946) is a Canadian politician who served as the seventh mayor of Mississauga from 2024 to 2026. She served as a Mississauga city councillor from 2006 to 2010 and from 2014 to 2024 when she resigned to contest the 2024 by-election for mayor. Prior to municipal politics, she served as a member of Parliament (MP), representing ridings of Mississauga from 1993 to 2006. She sat as a Liberal until 2004.

== Background ==
Parrish was born as Karolina Janozeski and is of Polish heritage. Her sister is romance novelist Marsha Canham. Parrish graduated from St. Michael's College, University of Toronto, in 1969, and from the Ontario College of Education in 1970. She became a high school teacher and taught at Burnhamthorpe Collegiate Institute in Etobicoke, where her students included Catherine O'Hara. She served as a Trustee on the Peel Board of Education from 1985 to 1990, and was chairperson from 1988 to 1990.

== Federal politics ==
Parrish was first elected to the House of Commons as a Liberal in the 1993 election and was re-elected in the three subsequent general elections of 1997, 2000, and 2004. She ended her federal career representing the Ontario riding of Mississauga—Erindale as an independent member of Parliament.

=== Criticism of U.S. President George W. Bush ===
Never promoted from the parliamentary backbench, Parrish was largely unknown nationally until the eve of the U.S.-led Invasion of Iraq in 2003. On her way out of a meeting on February 26, 2003, in a media scrum, Parrish was overheard on a boom mike saying, "Damn Americans, I hate those bastards!" She later told the media that her comments were directed towards George W. Bush and his administration and not the American people as a whole. Members of the opposition Canadian Alliance party called for her to be punished by then Liberal leader and Prime Minister Jean Chrétien, but no disciplinary action occurred.

After the widespread media attention on her "America-bashing" incident, she remained popular in her home riding. After electoral redistribution leading up to the 2004 election, she faced fellow Liberal MP Steve Mahoney in a nomination battle and narrowly won. She was re-elected with 54% of the vote in the general election, against 32% for her Conservative opponent.

In August 2004, Parrish again created controversy by referring to those supporting the North American missile defence proposal as "a coalition of the idiots," mocking the phrase "coalition of the willing" used by Bush describing the American-led alliance in the invasion of Iraq. Paul Martin, who had succeeded Chrétien as Prime Minister, asked her to use more tact and discretion when sharing her opinions about such subjects but stopped short of asking her to apologize. She responded by saying, "I was elected by thousands of people in my riding. They have known me for years. I think they like my style."

Following the November U.S. election, she expressed shock at the re-election of George W. Bush. She said that "America is completely out of touch with the rest of the free world" and blamed this on collective "profound psychological damage" due to the September 11, 2001 attacks. She was also quoted as saying, "I wouldn't guess what's next on his agenda, but it's probably not peace and love." When Conservative Party members called on her to apologize for these remarks she said that such comments "are in the best traditions of free speech and independence of thought." Earlier that day, Martin had told Liberal MPs in a closed caucus meeting to avoid provocative statements following the U.S. election. Parrish, who did not attend the meeting, said the advice would not have altered what she said.

In October 2004, at the annual Parliamentary Press Gallery dinner in Ottawa, Martin joked about meeting with Bush and discussing the possibility of a crewed mission to Mars. "I thought to myself, wouldn't it be great if we could get a Canadian on board? If a Canadian could be sent tens of millions of miles into the dark void of space. And as we all as a nation watch on television and together say aloud, `Bon voyage, Carolyn Parrish!'"

=== This Hour Has 22 Minutes incident and departure from caucus ===
On November 17, 2004, clips of a skit for the CBC Television comedy series This Hour Has 22 Minutes were released, in which she stomped on a Bush doll and stuck a pin in its head, where she said "it would do the least damage." The full version was to air on November 19. The sketch caused outrage from Conservative members and prompted Martin to ask for a meeting with her.

On November 18, a Canadian Press story quoted her as saying Martin, and those around him, could "go to hell" if they wanted her to stop making similar comments. She went on to say that she had no loyalty towards the Liberal Party and that if it were defeated in the next election, she "would not shed a tear," as she had felt betrayed by Martin's lack of help for her during her nomination and election campaigns. In response to these comments, Martin, with the support of National Liberal Caucus chair Andy Savoy, expelled her from caucus, saying, "I told her that, while I have defended her right to express her views frankly, I cannot, as leader of our party and the government caucus, tolerate behaviour that demeans and disrespects others."

On November 19, Parrish spoke to the press about her expulsion from caucus. She said that had she been in Martin's place, she would have done the same. She went on to say, however, that the party under Martin had fallen into disarray and that Martin and his inner circle ran the party using guerrilla warfare tactics. She said she would still vote with the Liberals on the vast majority of legislation, but would now be free to express her views without fear of reprisal.

Though excluded from caucus, Parrish initially still sat as a Liberal in the House of Commons but became an independent on November 21 so that the speaker would give her time in member's statements and question period without the notice of the Liberal whip.

On November 30, 2004, Parrish appeared on CNN in an interview with Wolf Blitzer and Tucker Carlson, defending her position against Bush and her recent actions that led to her ousting from the Liberal party. She also defended the overall Canadian stance regarding the Iraq War and the National Missile Defence program. Several days later Martin appeared on Late Edition, with Blitzer hosting. Blitzer talked about several MPs attacking Bush and Martin replied that only Parrish had made attacks and that they had been condemned throughout Parliament.

=== Independent MP and retirement from federal politics ===
Parrish announced in December 2004 that she would oppose the Martin government's proposed legislation to legally establish same-sex marriage in Canada. A surprise to the Prime Minister, Parrish claimed that, although she personally supports same-sex marriage, her constituents were generally opposed to it.

On May 19, 2005, Paul Martin's Liberal government faced two votes of confidence on its 2005-06 budget legislation. In the days leading up to the vote, Parrish said that she would support the government despite her difficulties with Martin's administration. Her support was critical to the government's survival, given the even division in the house. On the morning of the vote, Parrish informed a media representative that she was suffering from severe pain due to a medical ailment. She attended the vote, which the government won by one vote.

In July 2005, Parrish chastised Chief of Defence Staff General Rick Hillier as being "dangerous" and a "testosterone-filled general" after he made comments stating that a soldier's purpose was "to be able to kill people" such as terrorists whom he described as "murderers and scumbags."

Although Parrish indicated that she was considering returning to the Liberal caucus and remains to date a card-carrying member of the Liberal Party, an aide to the Prime Minister stated on July 29, 2005, that "he's not even entertaining the thought of welcoming Carolyn Parrish back to caucus." Parrish was the only one of four Independent MPs in the House to vote with the government against the successful November 28, 2005 motion of non-confidence that brought down the Liberal government.

On October 13, 2005, Parrish's spokeswoman announced that the MP had sent a letter to her constituents stating that she would not stand for re-election. She endorsed Charles Sousa as her preferred successor; however, Omar Alghabra ultimately won the Liberal nomination for the riding ahead of the 2006 election.

== Municipal politics ==
=== Mississauga City Councillor ===
In the 2006 municipal election, Parrish was elected to Ward 6 by 1,400 votes. In 2009, she raised concerns on council regarding the possible conflict of interest of then-mayor of Mississauga, Hazel McCallion's son's company in a failed land deal involving the council, and McCallion herself in promoting it. In particular, she claimed that he personally stood to gain $10 million. An inquiry led by Douglas Cunningham was ultimately called to investigate the allegations. However, at the 2010 municipal election, Parrish lost to McCallion ally Ron Starr by 1,889 votes. She subsequently announced her retirement from political life, although has left the way open for re-entering at some point. She contested a by-election in neighbouring Ward 5 on September 19, 2011, losing to Bonnie Crombie by 241 votes. Shortly after the election, Cunningham's report was released, including a finding that McCallion had a "conflict of interest, both real and apparent" in the land deal. Parrish told media that she felt the election result would have been different had this been known.

Parrish was the councillor for Ward 5 in Mississauga City Council, after winning the seat in the 2014 municipal election. She has stated that she believes non-citizen permanent residents should have the right to sit on municipal committees, though not on the city council itself.

In 2026, she stated that she had joined the Ontario Liberal Party in 2023 to vote for Crombie in that year's leadership election.

On February 20, 2024, Parrish sent a letter to the Mississauga ward 5 constituents informing them that she would be resigning her councillor's seat effective March 15, 2024, in order to run for the mayor's seat in a citywide by-election to be held June 10, 2024, to replace former mayor Bonnie Crombie. She was elected as the seventh mayor of Mississauga and was succeeded as councillor by Natalie Hart.

=== Mayor of Mississauga ===
Parrish was sworn in as the seventh mayor of Mississauga on June 24, 2024. She was the third consecutive woman to serve the role. After becoming mayor, Parrish removed the city's chief administrative officer Shari Lichterman and replaced her with Geoff Wright using strong mayor powers. She appointed Ward 8 Erin Mills councillor Matt Mahoney as deputy mayor the same month. As mayor, Parrish pursued close relations with the Ford government to push for increased provincial funding to Mississauga. In November 2024, Parrish resigned from the Peel Police Services Board to protest the board's planned $136 million (approximately 21%) budget increase for the Peel Regional Police when residents' cost of living was an issue. Traditionally, the mayor of Mississauga has a seat on the board.

Parrish was defeated by Alvin Tedjo for re-election in 2026, becoming the first mayor to lose re-election since 1978. The election was marked by a bitter campaign between Parrish and Bonnie Crombie.

==== Housing ====
Mississauga previously was accused by the provincial government of having the lowest rate of housing starts, and Parrish after taking office pushed for increasing the number of new buildings approved. She created the Mayor’s Housing Task Force, made up of developers, which developed a report of recommendations for the city to increase housing supply. The report focused around reforming zoning laws and development taxes, as well as funding affordable housing. Based on these recommendations, in 2025, the city cut development charges in half, which Parrish claimed resulted in requests for 13,000 new units.

Parrish supports reforming zoning laws to allow for increased housing, as well as converting vacant offices and malls into mixed-use housing.

==== Sinwar vigil controversy ====
In November 2024, Parrish faced criticism for her response to a planned vigil honoring Hamas leader Yahya Sinwar at Mississauga's Celebration Square. When questioned about the event at a city council meeting, Parrish compared Sinwar to Nelson Mandela, stating "Nelson Mandela was declared a terrorist by the United States of America 'til the year 2008. Your terrorist and somebody else's terrorist may be two different things".

The vigil was organized by Canadian Defenders 4 Human Rights (CD4HR) and was initially scheduled for November 26, 2024. Parrish initially defended the event's right to proceed under the Charter of Rights and Freedoms, despite Hamas being designated as a terrorist entity by Canada since 2002. The event drew additional controversy for using the Royal Canadian Legion's trademarked poppy symbol and "Lest We Forget" slogan in its promotional materials.

Multiple Jewish organizations, including the Centre for Israel and Jewish Affairs (CIJA) and B'nai Brith Canada, condemned Parrish's statements and called for an apology. Canada's special envoy combatting antisemitism, Deborah Lyons, called the idea of a commemoration for Sinwar on Canadian soil "atrocious".

The organizers eventually cancelled the vigil, citing security concerns, though they indicated they had been assured by the City of Mississauga that they could hold the event on another date. Jewish community leaders continued to call for an apology from Parrish for her comments comparing Sinwar to Mandela.
