= Mississauga East—Cooksville (provincial electoral district) =

Provincial electoral district in Ontario, Canada

Coordinates: 43.7°N 79.7°W

Ontario electoral district
- Location in Mississauga

Provincial electoral district
- Legislature: Legislative Assembly of Ontario
MPP
Silvia Gualtieri
Progressive Conservative
- District created: 2003
- First contested: 2007
- Last contested: 2025

Demographics
- Population (2021): 116,346
- Electors (2025): 87,521
- Area (km²): 32
- Pop. density (per km²): 3,635.8
- Census division: Peel
- Census subdivision: Mississauga

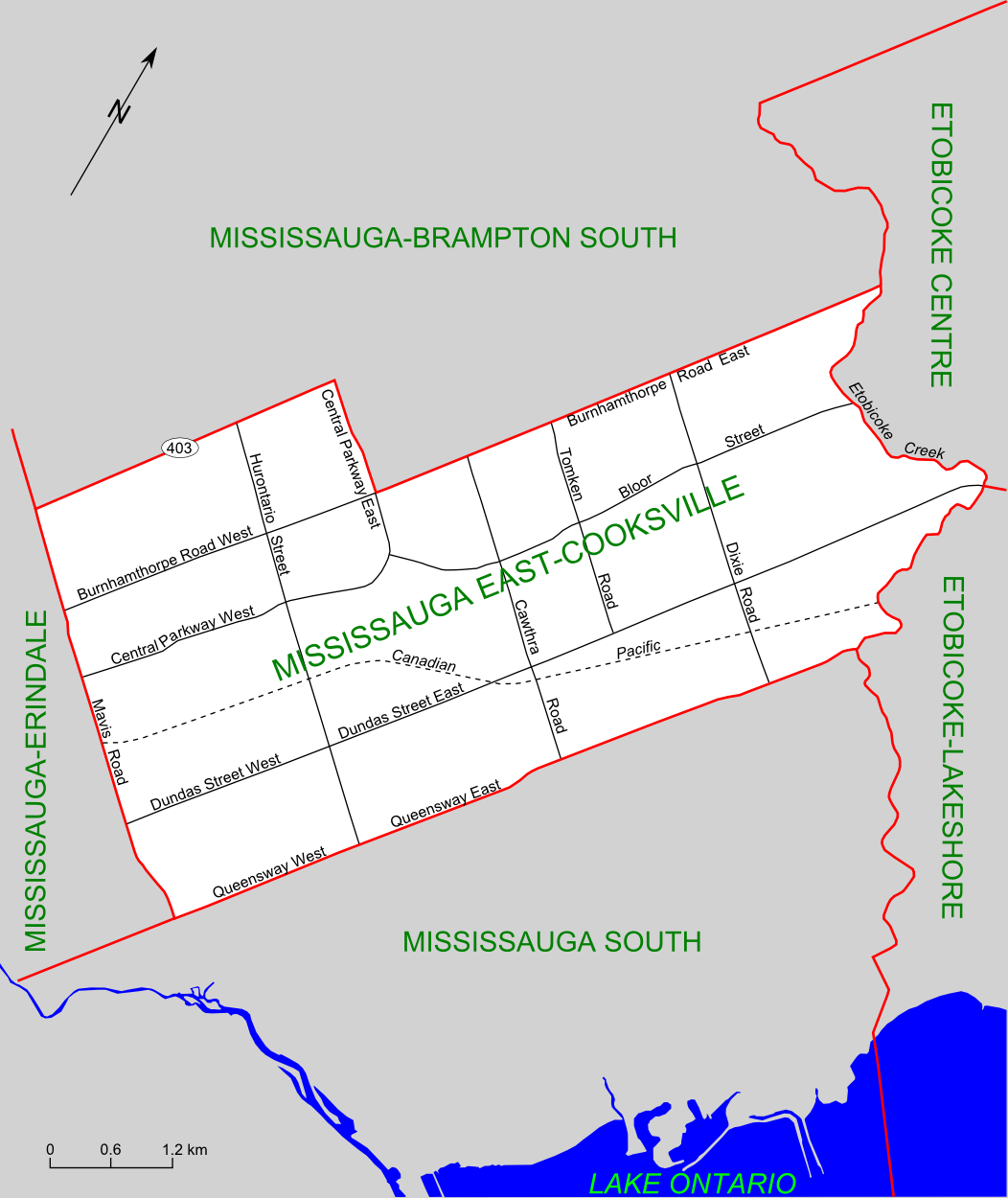
Map of Mississauga East-Cooksville (2005-2015 boundaries)

Mississauga East—Cooksville is a provincial electoral district in Ontario, Canada, that has been represented in the Legislative Assembly of Ontario since the 2007 provincial election.

== History ==
The riding was created in 2003 from parts of Mississauga Centre and Mississauga East ridings. It consists of the part of the city of Mississauga east of a line drawn from north to south along the Queensway, Mavis Road, Highway 403, Central Parkway East and Burnhamthorpe Road East.

== Members of Provincial Parliament ==
This riding has elected the following members of the Legislative Assembly of Ontario:

Mississauga East—Cooksville
| Assembly | Years | Member | Party |
|---|---|---|---|
Riding created from Mississauga Centre and Mississauga East
| 39th | 2007–2011 | Peter Fonseca | Liberal |
| 40th | 2011–2014 | Dipika Damerla | Liberal |
| 41st | 2014–2018 | Dipika Damerla | Liberal |
| 42nd | 2018–2022 | Kaleed Rasheed | Progressive Conservative |
| 43rd | 2022–2023 | Kaleed Rasheed | Progressive Conservative |
| 43rd | 2023–2025 | Kaleed Rasheed | Independent |
| 44th | 2025–present | Silvia Gualtieri | Progressive Conservative |

== Election results ==
Winning party in each polling division of Mississauga East—Cooksville at the 2025 Ontario general election

2025 Ontario general election
| Party | Candidate | Votes | % | ±% |
|---|---|---|---|---|
| Progressive Conservative | Silvia Gualtieri | 16,764 | 46.69 | +5.78 |
| Liberal | Bonnie Crombie | 15,554 | 43.32 | +5.97 |
| New Democratic | Alex Venuto | 1,879 | 5.23 | –5.60 |
| Green | David Zeni | 744 | 2.07 | –1.91 |
| New Blue | Kevin Peck | 429 | 1.19 | –3.54 |
| Independent | Syed Hussain | 223 | 0.62 | N/A |
| Independent | Mark De Pelham | 205 | 0.57 | N/A |
| Ontario Party | Vittoria Trichilo | 192 | 0.53 | –1.32 |
| Moderate | Oleksandra Iakolieva | 118 | 0.33 | –0.03 |
| Total valid votes | | 35,903 | 99.39 | +0.04 |
| Total rejected, unmarked and declined ballots | | 222 | 0.61 | –0.04 |
| Turnout | | 36,125 | 41.28 | +1.70 |
| Eligible voters | | 87,521 | | |
| Progressive Conservative hold | | Swing | | –0.10 |
Source(s): "Candidates in: Mississauga East—Cooksville (061)". Elections Ontario.; D'Andrea, Aaron (January 28, 2025). "Liberals' Bonnie Crombie chooses riding as Doug Ford readies early Ontario vote". Global News. Cornwell, Steve (January 28, 2025). "'Fired up': Ontario Liberal leader Bonnie Crombie announces Mississauga riding she's running in ahead of possible Feb. 27 election". Mississauga.com.; "Mississauga East—Cooksville Unofficial Election Results". Elections Ontario. February 28, 2025.

Winning party in each polling division of Mississauga East—Cooksville at the 2022 Ontario general election

2022 Ontario general election
| Party | Candidate | Votes | % | ±% |
|---|---|---|---|---|
| Progressive Conservative | Kaleed Rasheed | 13,840 | 40.91 | −0.24 |
| Liberal | Dipika Damerla | 12,634 | 37.35 | +7.11 |
| New Democratic | Khawar Hussain | 3,664 | 10.83 | −11.91 |
| New Blue | Mark Morrissey | 1,599 | 4.73 | |
| Green | James Hea | 1,345 | 3.98 | +0.52 |
| Ontario Party | Gregory Tomchyshyn | 625 | 1.85 | |
| Moderate | Wiktor Jachtholtz | 121 | 0.36 | −0.05 |
| Total valid votes | | 33,828 | 100.0 | |
| Total rejected, unmarked, and declined ballots | | 222 | | |
| Turnout | | 34,050 | 39.58 | |
| Eligible voters | | 85,958 | | |
| Progressive Conservative hold | | Swing | | −3.68 |
Source(s): "Summary of Valid Votes Cast for Each Candidate" (PDF). Elections Ontario. 2022. Archived from the original on May 18, 2023.; "Statistical Summary by Electoral District" (PDF). Elections Ontario. 2022. Archived from the original on May 21, 2023.

2018 Ontario general election
| Party | Candidate | Votes | % | ±% |
|---|---|---|---|---|
| Progressive Conservative | Kaleed Rasheed | 17,862 | 41.15 | +13.22 |
| Liberal | Dipika Damerla | 13,123 | 30.23 | −19.96 |
| New Democratic | Tom Takacs | 9,871 | 22.74 | +7.83 |
| Green | Basia Krzyzanowski | 1,498 | 3.45 | −0.20 |
| Libertarian | Mark Donaldson | 463 | 1.07 | N/A |
| None of the Above | Leonard Little | 413 | 0.95 | N/A |
| Moderate | Mykola Ponomarenko | 175 | 0.40 | N/A |
| Total valid votes | | 43,405 | 98.97 | |
| Total rejected, unmarked and declined ballots | | 447 | 1.03 | |
| Turnout | | 43,852 | 52.2 | |
| Eligible voters | | 83,122 | | |
| Progressive Conservative notional gain from Liberal | | Swing | | +16.59 |
Source: Elections Ontario

2014 general election redistributed results
| Party | Vote | % |
|---|---|---|
| Liberal | 18,510 | 50.19 |
| Progressive Conservative | 10,302 | 27.93 |
| New Democratic | 5,500 | 14.91 |
| Green | 1,344 | 3.65 |
| Others | 1,224 | 3.32 |

2014 Ontario general election
| Party | Candidate | Votes | % | ±% |
|---|---|---|---|---|
| Liberal | Dipika Damerla | 20,934 | 52.33 | +6.59 |
| Progressive Conservative | Zoran Churchin | 10,479 | 26.20 | −7.06 |
| New Democratic | Fayaz Karim | 6,158 | 15.39 | −1.40 |
| Green | Linh Nguyen | 1,408 | 3.52 | +0.97 |
| Libertarian | Levko Iwanusiw | 788 | 1.97 | |
| Equal Parenting | Dolly Catena | 234 | 0.58 | |
| Total valid votes | | 40,001 | 100.0 | |
| Total rejected, unmarked and declined ballots | | 557 | 1.37 | |
| Turnout | | 40,558 | 43.89 | |
| Eligible voters | | 92,402 | | |
| Liberal hold | | Swing | | +6.83 |
Source(s) Elections Ontario (2014). "Official Returns from the Records, 048 Mississauga East-Cooksville" (PDF).

2011 Ontario general election
| Party | Candidate | Votes | % | ±% |
|---|---|---|---|---|
| Liberal | Dipika Damerla | 15,535 | 45.74 | −13.19 |
| Progressive Conservative | Zoran Churchin | 11,297 | 33.26 | +10.18 |
| New Democratic | Waseem Ahmed | 5,704 | 16.79 | +8.33 |
| Green | Lloyd Jones | 934 | 2.75 | −3.50 |
| Independent | Winston Harding | 199 | 0.59 | |
| Freedom | Jonathon Dury | 177 | 0.52 | −0.12 |
| Paramount Canadians | Shriya Shah-Klorfine | 117 | 0.34 | |
| Total valid votes | | 33,963 | 100.00 | |
| Total rejected, unmarked and declined ballots | | 191 | 0.56 | |
| Turnout | | 34,154 | 40.50 | |
| Eligible voters | | 84,330 | | |
| Liberal hold | | Swing | | −11.69 |
Source(s) Elections Ontario (2011). "Official return from the records / Rapport des registres officiels - Mississauga East—Cooksville" (PDF).

2007 Ontario general election
| Party | Candidate | Votes | % |
|---|---|---|---|
| Liberal | Peter Fonseca | 22,249 | 58.93 |
| Progressive Conservative | Zoran Churchin | 8,715 | 23.08 |
| New Democratic | Satish Balasunderam | 3,192 | 8.46 |
| Green | Carla Cassanova | 2,361 | 6.25 |
| Family Coalition | Al Zawadzki | 992 | 2.63 |
| Freedom | Ryan Jamieson | 243 | 0.64 |
| Total valid votes | | 37,752 | 100.0 |
| Total rejected, unmarked and declined ballots | | 349 | 0.92 |
| Turnout | | 38,101 | 47.47 |
| Eligible voters | | 80,247 | |
| Liberal pickup new district. | | | |
Source(s) Elections Ontario (2007). "General Election Poll by Poll Results, 048 Mississauga East—Cooksville" (PDF).

== 2007 electoral reform referendum ==
2007 Ontario electoral reform referendum
| Side | Votes | % |
|---|---|---|
| First Past the Post | 21,898 | 61.6 |
| Mixed member proportional | 13,659 | 38.4 |
| Total valid votes | 35,557 | 100.0 |

== See also ==
- List of Ontario provincial electoral districts
- Canadian provincial electoral districts
- Mississauga East—Cooksville (federal electoral district)
