= Springdale, Brampton =

Springdale
- Suburban district
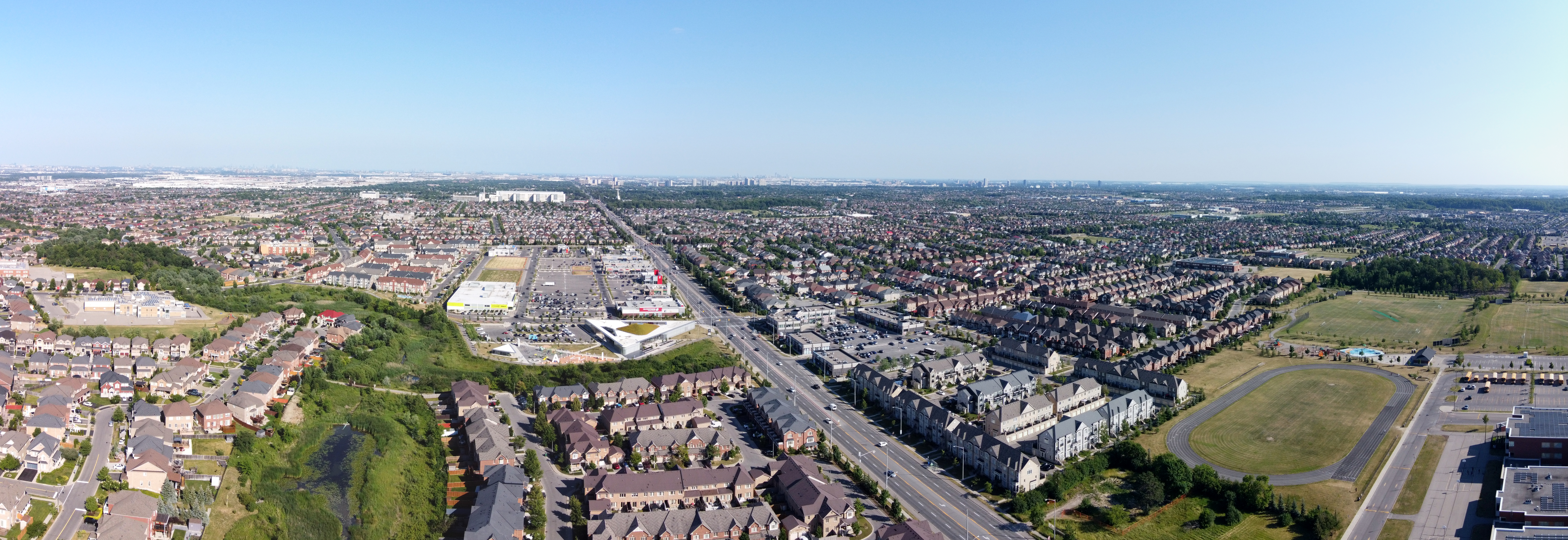
- Aerial view of Springdale
- Interactive map of Springdale
- Coordinates: 43°45′30″N 79°45′20″W
- Country: Canada
- Province: Ontario
- Regional municipality: Peel
- City: Brampton
- Established: 1991 (as New Town)

Government
  - MPs: Ruby Sahota (Brampton North—Caledon); Maninder Sidhu (Brampton East)
  - MPPs: Graham McGregor (Brampton North); Hardeep Grewal (Brampton East)
  - Councillors: Gurpartap Singh Toor (Regional councillor) (Wards 9 & 10); Harkirat Singh (City councillor) (Wards 9 & 10)

Population (2021) (Note: Total population (2021) calculated by summing up the populations of the 15 census tracts that cover Springdale, i.e., Countryside Drive to Bovaird Drive, Heart Lake Road to Airport Road)
  - Total: 89,524
- Postal code: L6R

Springdale is a large suburban district in Brampton, Ontario, Canada covering 4,000 acres (1,600 ha) in the northern part of the city. It is generally bounded by Countryside Drive to the north, Bovaird Drive to the south, Heart Lake Road to the west, and Airport Road to the east. Springdale is known for its large population of Sikh Canadians, who make up 39.6% of the community's population.

== History ==
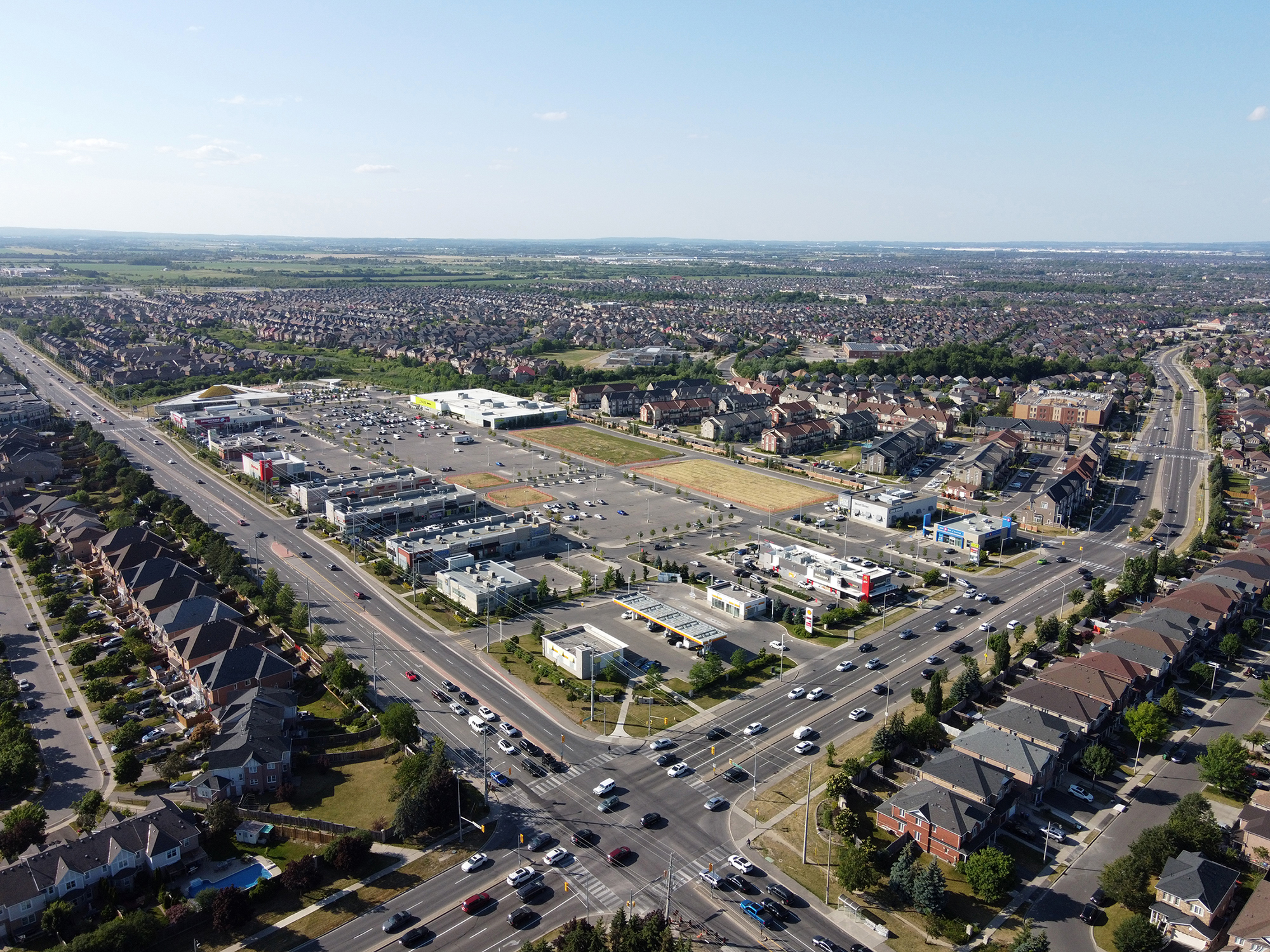
Plaza along Bramalea Road

The present-day area of Springdale was located in the southeastern part of Chinguacousy Township before the township was amalgamated into the city of Brampton in 1974.

Located at the east end of present-day Springdale along Airport Road was the hamlet of Stanley’s Mills; established in 1820. By 1860, the hamlet, characterized by an important milling industry, consisted of "three mills, a wagon shop, a blacksmith, tailor, seamstress, inn, store, post office, and Methodist church." The sole remaining vestige of the hamlet is the designated heritage site at 10416 Airport Road, a Gothic revival brick residence built circa 1860 and associated with the Alderson family, among Brampton’s earliest settlers. The Aldersons operated a mill in the 1860s and 1870s on the creek to the south of the present house.

Two other designated heritage sites are along Torbram Road and reflect the area’s rural and agricultural past. The Elliott Farmhouse, of a vernacular Ontario Gothic style, was built about 1865. The Elliott Homestead, of a Gothic Revival style, was built in 1876 and is linked to the former Harrison Methodist Church a kilometre south.

Springdale was planned in the 1980s, and construction began in 1991. The $5 billion “town within a city” was expected to be completed around 2005, and would house 75,000 people in 22,000 homes on a 4,000-acre site. The project was planned to include "a hospital, 17 churches [and places of worship], 13 public and nine separate schools, a public library, two fire stations, a police station, a public transit terminal, 45 community parks, a large regional shopping centre, 18 plazas, and three low-rise office complexes," as well as over 700 acres of park space or open green space and 120 kilometres of paved bike paths. As part of the "green" focus for Springdale, developers also gave the community’s eight different neighbourhoods a distinct geographical theme, such as mountains, tundra, grasslands, forests, deserts, and so on, and named the streets to reflect that particular environment.

In 2007, Highway 410 was extended from it original northern terminus at Bovaird Drive to Mayfield Road through the west end of Springdale, with an interchange at Sandalwood Parkway.

== Politics ==
Springdale is split in federal and provincial representation between Brampton North and Brampton East. Brampton North covers the area west of Torbram Road, south of Sandalwood Parkway, west of Bramalea Road, and north of Sandalwood Parkway. Brampton East covers the area east to Airport Road.

== Infrastructure ==
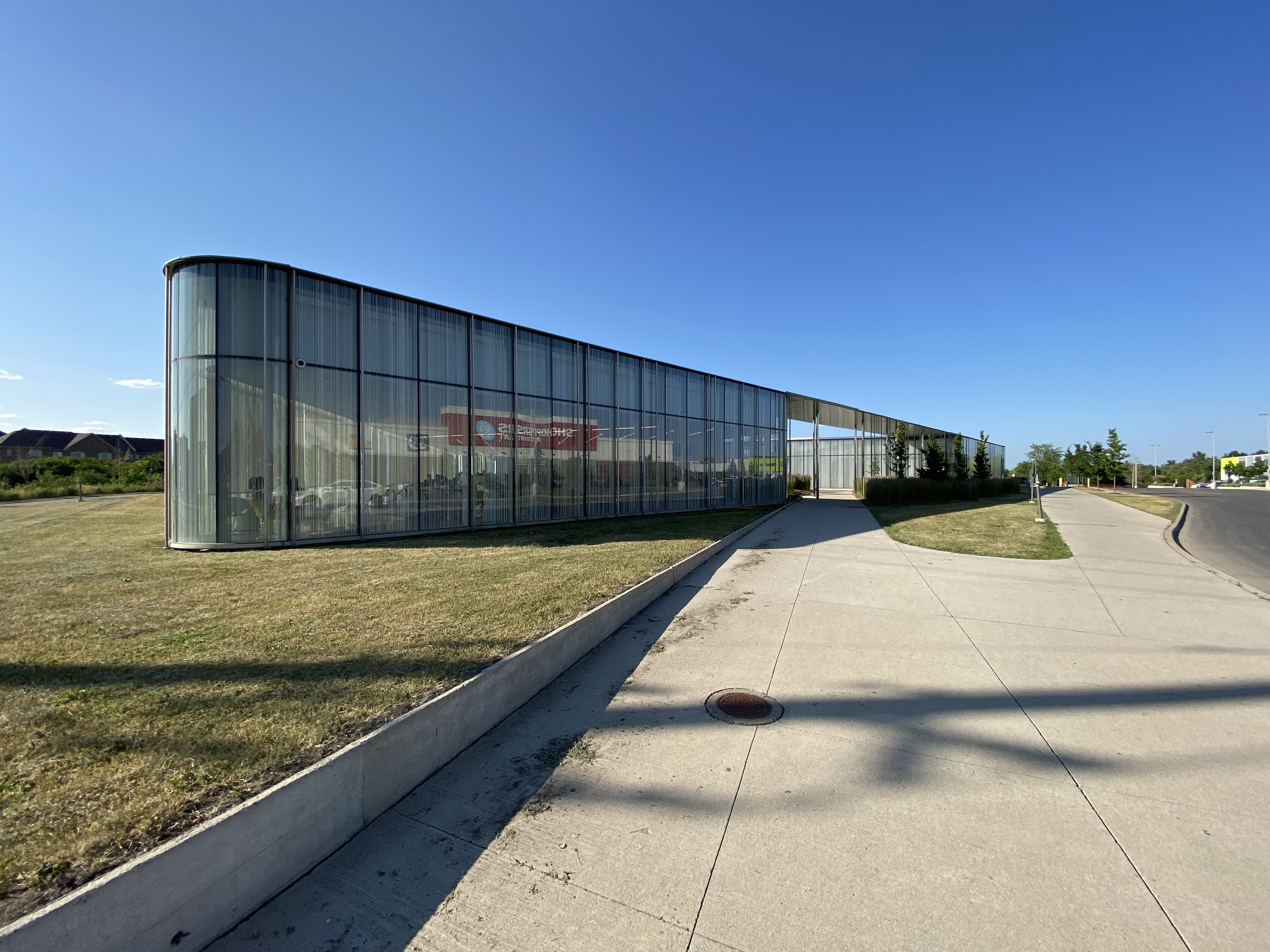
Brampton Library Springdale Branch

Brampton Civic Hospital, opened in 2007, is located in the area, along with two fire stations and a paramedic station.

Trinity Common Mall is a large shopping plaza in the area and includes a Cineplex movie theatre and transit terminal.

=== Recreation ===
The Save Max Sports Centre, formerly Brampton Soccer Centre, opened in 2007.

The Brampton Library, Springdale branch opened in 2019.

== Demographics ==
Religion in L6R (2021)
1. Sikh (39.6%)
2. Christian (24.9%)
3. Hindu (19.7%)
4. Muslim (8.50%)
5. Buddhist (1.10%)
6. Other (0.30%)
7. Irreligious (5.90%)

According to the 2016 Census, the top six mother tongues in the L6R forward sortation area (which is largely the area of Springdale) are English (36.3%), Punjabi (34.4%), Gujarati (3.6%), Urdu (2.8%), Tamil (2.6%), and Hindi (2.5%).

Immigrants make up 59.7% of residents in the area, compared to 52.3% for the city. Among the immigrant population, the top six places of birth are India (55.8%), Jamaica (6.6%), Guyana (4.9%), Pakistan (4.3%), Sri Lanka (4.3%), and the Philippines (3%).

Immigrant source countries (2016)
Country	%
India	55.8
Jamaica	6.6
Guyana	4.9
Sri Lanka	4.3
Pakistan	4.3
Philippines	3.0
Trinidad and Tobago	1.9
Others	19.1

Mother tongue	%
English	36.3
Punjabi	34.4
Gujarati	3.6
Urdu	2.8
Tamil	2.6
Hindi	2.5
Spanish	1.4
Tagalog (Filipino)	1.3
Italian	1.1
Vietnamese	0.7
Akan (Twi)	0.7
Cantonese	0.6
Portuguese	0.5
Malayalam	0.5
Persian (Farsi)	0.5
French	0.4
Arabic	0.4

Knowledge of language	%
English	92.3
Punjabi	42.8
Hindi	14.6
French	4.7
Urdu	4.5
Gujarati	4.2
Tamil	3.4
Spanish	1.9
Tagalog (Filipino)	1.7
Italian	1.4
Akan (Twi)	1
Vietnamese	0.9
Cantonese	0.9
Portuguese	0.9
Persian (Farsi)	0.7
Arabic	0.7
Malayalam	0.7

== Education ==
There are numerous elementary and middle schools, and four secondary schools in the area.

=== Peel District School Board ===
Elementary and middle schools

- Carberry Public School
- Eagle Plains Public School
- Fernforest Public School
- Great Lakes Public School
- Hewson Public School
- Larkspur Public School
- Lougheed Middle School
- Mountain Ash Public School
- Robert J. Lee Public School
- Shaw Public School
- Springdale Public School
- Stanley Mills Public School
- Sunny View Middle School

Secondary schools

- Harold M. Brathwaite Secondary School
- Louise Arbour Secondary School
- Sandalwood Heights Secondary School

=== Dufferin-Peel Catholic District School Board ===
- Blessed Michael J. McGivney Catholic School
- Father Clair Tipping School
- Good Shepherd Elementary School
- Our Lady of Providence School
- St. Isaac Jogues Elementary School
- St. Marguerite d'Youville Secondary School

== Notable people ==
- Ayo Akinola - professional soccer player
- Anthony Bennett - professional basketball player
- Nakas Onyeka - professional Canadian football player
- Tristan Thompson - professional basketball player
