= Dixie Road (Peel Region) =

Road in Ontario, Canada

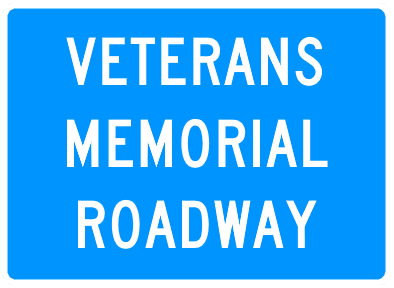
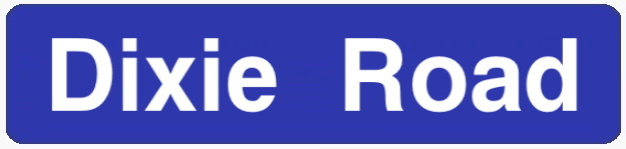
- Peel Regional Road 4 Veterans Memorial Roadway
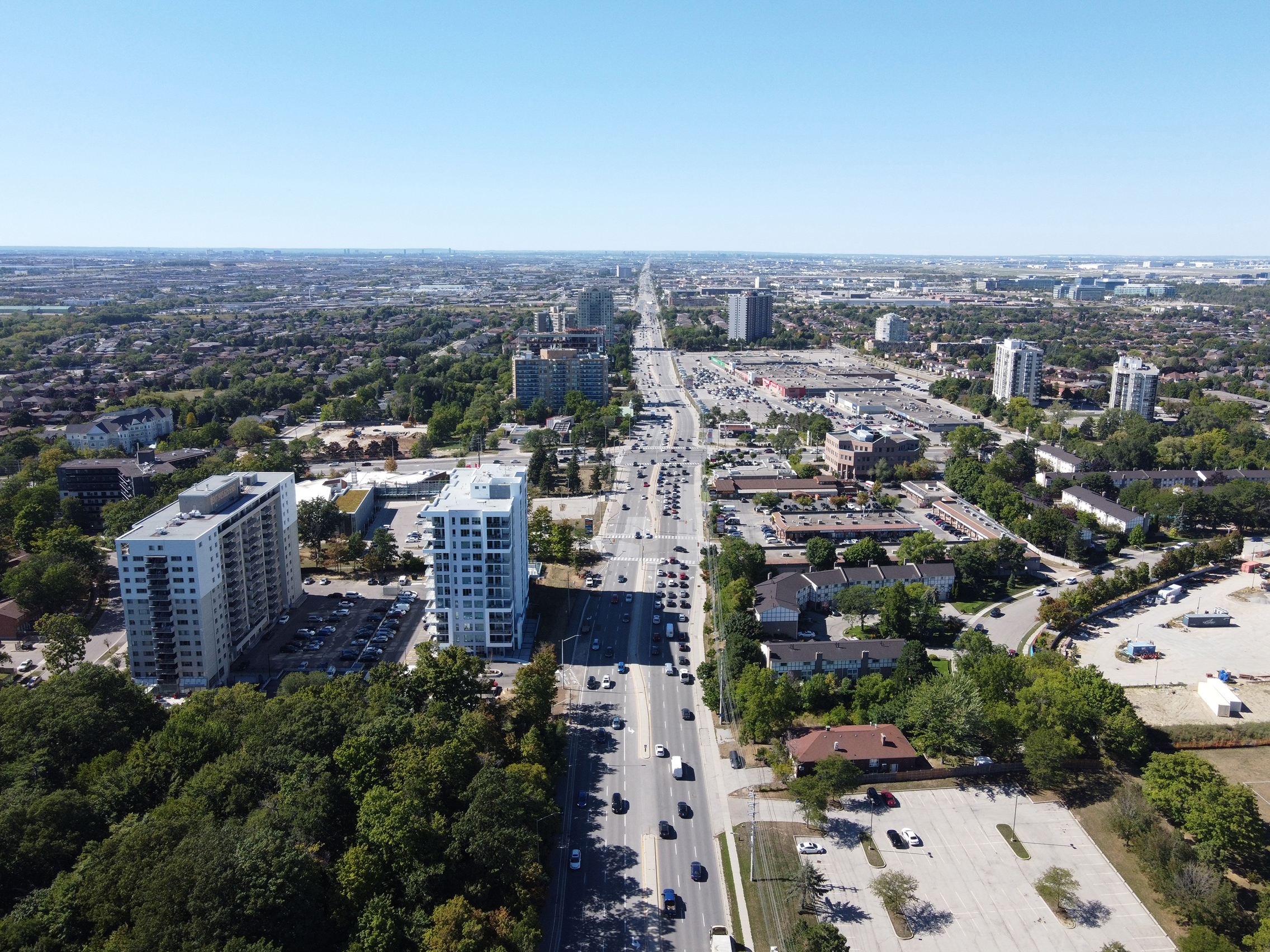
- Aerial view of Dixie Road, looking north from near Burnhamthorpe Road

- Route of Dixie Road (solid blue line). Also shown is the continuation of the Veterans Memorial Roadway designation along Horseshoe Hill Road (dotted blue line).
- Namesake: Beaumont Dixie
- Maintained by: Region of Peel
- Length: 38.3 km (23.8 mi)
- Location: Peel Region (Mississauga, Brampton, Caledon)
- South end: Lakeshore Road in Mississauga
- Major junctions: Queen Elizabeth Way; Queensway; Dundas Street; Bloor Street; Burnhamthorpe Road; Rathburn Road; Eastgate Parkway; Eglinton Avenue; Matheson Boulevard; Highway 401; Britannia Road; Courtneypark Drive; Derry Road; 407 ETR; Steeles Avenue; Queen Street; Williams Parkway; Bovaird Drive; Sandalwood Parkway; Countryside Drive; Mayfield Road; Old School Road; King Street; Boston Mills Road
- North end: Olde Base Line Road in Caledon (continues as Horseshoe Hill Road)

Other
Nearby arterial roads
← Cawthra Road; Highway 403; Highway 410; Highway 10 / Hurontario Street	Brown's Line; Highway 427; Airport Road →

Dixie Road is a major north–south thoroughfare in the Regional Municipality of Peel in Ontario, Canada, passing through the lower-tier cities of Mississauga and Brampton, and the rural town of Caledon. It is roughly 38 km (24 mi.) long and is the third concession road east of Hurontario Street, and before being named was concession-numbered as 3rd Line East. It is designated and signposted as Peel Regional Road 4 in Peel's regional road system. Despite already being named, it has also been designated as Veterans Memorial Roadway (which extends along its continuation, Horseshoe Hill Road) since 2016.

== Name ==
Dixie Road is named for the Dixie neighbourhood (a former rural hamlet at Cawthra Road and Dundas Street in Mississauga, 2 km (1.25 mi.) to the west of the street along Dundas), which was in turn named for Beaumont Dixie, a settler who paid for the establishment of the Union Chapel, a multi-denominational Protestant church in the community.

== Route description ==
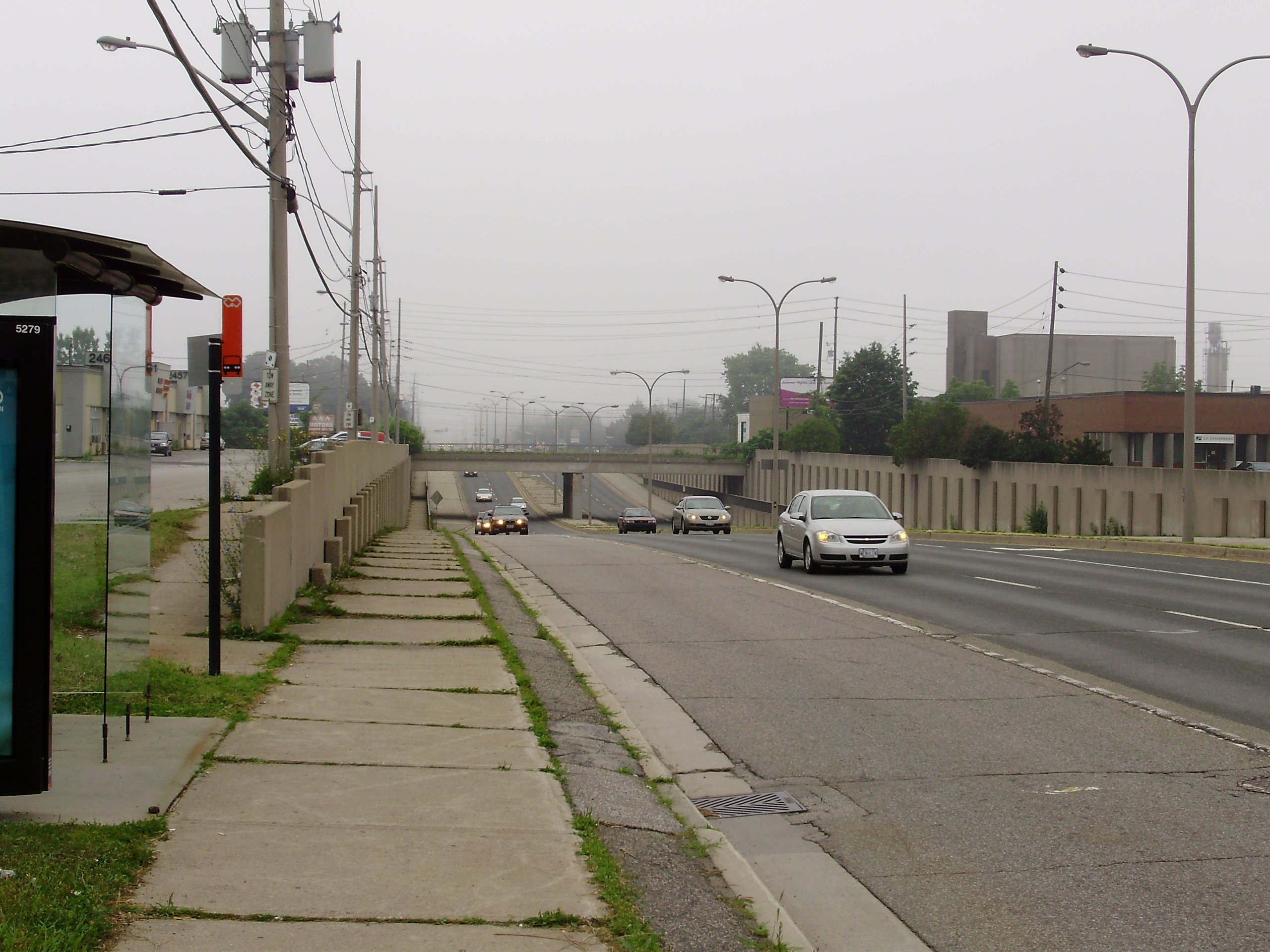
South of Dundas Street East, Dixie Road dips beneath a railway bridge carrying the GO Transit Milton line

Dixie begins at Lakeshore Road in southeast Mississauga at Lake Ontario in the Lakeview neighbourhood, just west of the Etobicoke Creek near the Toronto city limits. A short distance north of Lakeshore, it dips under GO Transit's Lakeshore West Line tracks. It then interchanges with the Queen Elizabeth Way and passes through the Applewood (where it passes under the Canadian Pacific Kansas City tracks which host GO Transit's Milton line trains, with Dixie GO station a short distance southeast of the Dundas Street) intersection) and Rockwood Village neighbourhoods. At Eastgate Parkway, a road running through a hydro corridor, it crosses the Mississauga Transitway, an east–west bus rapid transit line also running through the corridor, with a station at Dixie. It then enters a major industrialized zone with heavy truck traffic and is often congested as a result. In the centre of this industrial district, it interchanges with Highway 401. Some distance north of that freeway the industrial development thins out as Dixie passes the western outfield of Toronto Pearson International Airport and the end of Runway 05. North of Derry Road, it crosses through another hydro corridor and the tolled Highway 407 and enters Brampton.

North of Steeles Avenue, Dixie passes under the Canadian National tracks carrying GO Transit Kitchener Line trains, enters residential areas again as it continues through the Bramalea district, passing the namesake Bramalea City Centre, a regional shopping mall at Queen Street, which was originally Highway 7, and is now Peel Regional Road 107. It enters both the Springdale district north of Bovaird Drive, and narrows to a two-lane semi-rural road as it passes through a mixed residential/commercial area still under development as it approaches Mayfield Road.

Dixie then enters the mostly rural Town of Caledon north of Mayfield, though it briefly passes through an area of newer industrial developments (both complete and under construction) spilling over from Brampton before the suburban environs give way to farmland. It ends at Olde Base Line Road (Peel Regional Road 12) at a roundabout where it becomes Horseshoe Hill Road, which continues to and ends at Highway 9.

== Public transit ==
Dixie Road is served by two bus routes in Mississauga and Brampton. Both cities operate separate systems; MiWay in Mississauga and Brampton Transit in Brampton. MiWay's Route #5 Dixie's southern terminus is at Long Branch Loop in Toronto, where it makes connections with GO Transit commuter trains and even the city's streetcar system, which otherwise is limited to areas closer to its downtown. Brampton Transit's Route #18 Dixie travels into Mississauga as far south as Meyerside Drive, and also has limited service extending a short distance north into Caledon.

The trunk routes serving the street are:

Mississauga (MiWay):

Route		Direction and Termini			
5	Dixie	NB	To Lorimar Dr. / Cardiff Blvd. (Derry Road) via Mid-way Blvd.	SB	Long Branch GO station (Long Branch Loop)

Brampton (Brampton Transit):

Route		Direction and Termini			
18	Dixie	NB	To Mayfield Road (Limited service extends to UPS warehouse in Caledon)	SB	To Meyerside Drive

== Landmarks ==
Sites along Dixie Road include:

- Dixie Outlet Mall
- Dixie GO Station
- Canada Post Warehouse
- Toronto Pearson International Airport (Near end of Runway 05)
- Ontario Khalsa Darbar
- Bramalea City Centre
- St. Marguerite d'Youville Secondary School
- UPS Warehouse
