= RDH Architects =

Design studio specialising in civic buildings, based in Toronto, Canada

RDH Architects Inc.
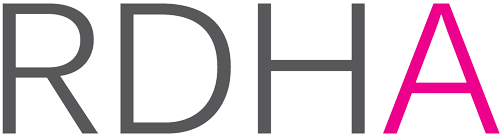
- Formation: 1919
- Founder: Ferdinand Marani
- Type: Architecture firm
- Headquarters: Toronto, Ontario, Canada
- Key people: Bob Goyeche, Tyler Sharp, Geoff Miller
- Website: https://www.rdharch.com

RDH Architects Inc. (RDHA) is a Toronto-based design studio specializing in civic buildings. Founded in 1919, it is one of Canada’s oldest continuing architectural practices with a portfolio spanning mid-century corporate headquarters to contemporary public buildings. Recent work includes corporate headquarters, embassies and chanceries, industrial facilities, academic buildings, recreation centres, arenas, transportation infrastructure, and both academic and public libraries.

== Early practice (1919–1990) ==
The practice was founded by Ferdinand Marani in Toronto in 1919. At the time Marani frequented the Diet Kitchen Tea Room at 72 Bloor Street West, which was a gathering place for young architects such as John M. Lyle, Alvan Mathers, Eric Haldenby, Eric Arthur and others who sought to “raise appreciation for Canadian design and allied arts.” The group was informally dubbed “The Diet Kitchen School of Architecture,” and many of its members would go on to design landmark buildings in Canada. The practice was renamed Marani and Paisley in 1924, and then Marani Lawson and Paisley in 1927, when it landed its first major commission for the Medical Arts Building at the corner of Bloor and St. George Streets in Toronto. Over 75 years later, a plaque was affixed to its face by Heritage Toronto reading, “Designed in a Georgian-influenced style by Marani, Lawson and Paisley, Architects, it exhibits high-quality materials and craftsmanship, particularly in its stone detailing and main lobby.”

By 1930 the practice had become Marani, Lawson & Morris, and was responsible for The North American Life Assurance Company headquarters at King and University Streets. A 1932 article published in Construction described the seven-storey Art Deco building as “an edifice of real distinction, its simplicity of design and reversion to clean lines being somewhat in contrast to the earlier home of the company.”

In the 1940s, all three partners left the practice to support the war. Afterwards Lawson stepped down and the practice became Marani & Morris. Following the war, the studio began to adopt Modernism into its designs. The Bank of Canada building at 250 University Avenue in Toronto, completed in 1958, exemplifies Classical Modernism, a moderate approach to the movement that appealed to the practice’s corporate clients.

From 1964 to 1980, the practice operated as Marani, Rounthwaite & Dick, and then as Rounthwaite, Dick & Hadley. During this period, the studio designed the new Toronto Courthouse (1966) and the Bank of Canada headquarters in Ottawa with architect Arthur Erickson (1979).

== Current practice (1990– ) ==
The current practice, still based in Toronto, took the name RDH Architects in 2018, the initials of former partners Rounthwaite, Dick and Hadley. The studio is led by partners Bob Goyeche, Tyler Sharp, and Geoff Miller and is known for its designs for public and institutional buildings, including libraries, academic buildings, municipal government offices, and operations centres, and high-security facilities.

Sharp’s first project at RDH Architects, the renovation of the historic Bloor/Gladstone District Library in 2010, marked a significant turning point for the reputation of the firm. “A contemporary update and expansion of a 1913 library building”, the project has led to many more public library commissions since completion. The project received several awards for architectural excellence including in 2014 a RAIC Governor General’s Medal in Architecture, the highest architectural recognition in Canada. In 2014, Tyler Sharp received the RAIC’s Young Architect Award for his personal work and contributions to the studio’s portfolio.

Miller’s first project with RDHA, the Newmarket Operations Centre, was completed in 2011. The project also received a RAIC Governor General’s Medal in Architecture among numerous awards, proving that this generally overlooked industrial building type can demonstrate excellent design.

In 2018 RDHA received the Architectural Firm Award from the RAIC which recognizes a firm's achievements for its quality of architecture, its service to its clients, its innovations in practice, contributions to architectural education and to professional institutions and associations and public recognition. According to the RAIC jury, “There is a remarkable consistency throughout the last 10 to 15 years of work by a younger generation of designers that have taken over the firm and kept the lineage and re-established themselves as a leading designing firm in Toronto.”

== Awards ==
RDHA has been recognized with numerous provincial, national and international awards for design excellence, most notably five Governor General’s Medals in Architecture, the 2014 Royal Architectural Institute of Canada (RAIC) Young Architect Award for Principal and Design Director Tyler Sharp, and the 2018 RAIC Architectural Firm Award.

=== Governor General's Medals in Architecture ===
- Newmarket Operations Centre, Newmarket, Ontario, 2012
- The Mississauga Library Project, Mississauaga, Ontario, 2012
- Bloor/Gladstone District Library, Toronto, Ontario, 2014
- Springdale Library and Komagata Maru Park, Brampton, Ontario, 2020
- Idea Exchange Old Post Office, Cambridge, Ontario, 2022

=== Ontario Association of Architects (OAA) Design Excellence Awards ===
- Toronto Metropolitan University Raymond Chang School of Continuing Education, Toronto, Ontario, 2008
- Hamilton Central Library and Farmers’ Market, Hamilton, Ontario, 2011
- Bloor/Gladstone District Library, Toronto, Ontario, 2011
- Stoney Creek Recreation Centre, Stoney Creek, Ontario, 2014
- Williams Parkway Operations Centre, Brampton, Ontario, 2017
- Springdale Library and Komagata Maru Park, Brampton, Ontario, 2022

=== Canadian Architect Awards of Excellence ===
- First Leaside Securities Head Office, Uxbridge, Ontario, 2008
- Newmarket Operations Centre, Newmarket, Ontario, 2009
- Waterdown Library and Civic Centre, Hamilton, Ontario, 2013
- Springdale Library and Komagata Maru Park, Brampton, Ontario, 2015
- Eglinton GO Station, Toronto, Ontario, 2015
- Idea Exchange Old Post Office, Cambridge, Ontario, 2018
- Day Hall Renovation and Addition, University of Guelph, Guelph, Ontario, 2025

== Selected Projects ==
=== Cultural ===
- Bloor/Gladstone Library, Toronto, Ontario, 2009
- Hamilton Central Library and Farmers' Market, Hamilton, Ontario, 2010
- Mississauga Public Libraries – Lakeview Library, Port Credit Library, Lorne Park Library – Mississauga, Ontario, 2011
- Waterdown Library and Civic Centre, Hamilton, Ontario, 2015
- Springdale Library and Komagata Maru Park, Brampton, Ontario, 2018
- Idea Exchange Old Post Office, Cambridge, Ontario, 2018
- Centennial College Story Arts Library, Toronto, Ontario, 2021
- Hazel McCallion Central Library, Mississauga, Ontario, 2024

=== Education ===
- Academic Resource Centre at the University of Toronto Scarborough, Scarborough, Ontario, 2003
- Plaza Building, Brock University, St. Catharines, Ontario, 2007
- School of Optometry and Vision Science, University of Waterloo, Waterloo, Ontario, 2009
- Centre for Social Innovation and Davis Welcome Centre, Sheridan College, Brampton, Ontario, 2009
- Royal Canadian Electrical and Mechanical Engineering School, CFB Borden, Ontario, 2018
- FitzGerald Building Revitalization, University of Toronto (with OMA), Toronto, Ontario, 2025
- Lawson Centre for Sustainability, Trinity College, University of Toronto (with Mecanoo), Toronto, Ontario, 2026
- Day Hall Renewal Project, University of Guelph, Guelph, Ontario, ongoing

=== Industrial ===
- Newmarket Operations Centre, Newmarket, Ontario, 2010
- Robert C Austin Operations Centre, Halton Hills, Ontario, 2015
- Surrey Operations Centre, Surrey, BC, 2016
- Riverview Operations Centre, Riverview, New Brunswick, 2016
- Quinte West Operations Centre, Quinte West, Ontario, 2017
- Williams Parkway Operations Centre, Brampton, Ontario, 2017
- Whitehorse Central Operations Centre, Whitehorse, Yukon, 2020

=== Office ===
- First Leaside Securities Head Office, Uxbridge, Ontario, 2010

=== Recreation ===
- Cornwall Aquatic and Recreation Centre, Cornwall, Ontario, 2006
- Stoney Creek Recreation Centre, Hamilton, Ontario, 2012
- Harry Howel Twin Pad Arena, Hamilton, Ontario, 2012
- Welland International Flatwater Centre (with VJAA), Welland, Ontario, 2014
- Upper Canada College Rowing Facility (with VJAA), Toronto, Ontario, 2023
- Cloverdale Sport and Ice Complex, Surrey, British Columbia, 2025

=== Secure ===
- Canadian Chancery and Official Residence, Dhaka, Bangladesh, 2009
- Canadian Chancery and Official Residence, Abuja, Nigeria, 2016

=== Transit ===
- Guildwood GO Station, Scarborough, Ontario, 2021
- Scott Street Interlocking Signal Tower Generator, Toronto, Ontario, 2022
