= Brampton Soccer Centre =

Sports venue in Brampton, Ontario

Coordinates: 43.7436°N 79.76895°W

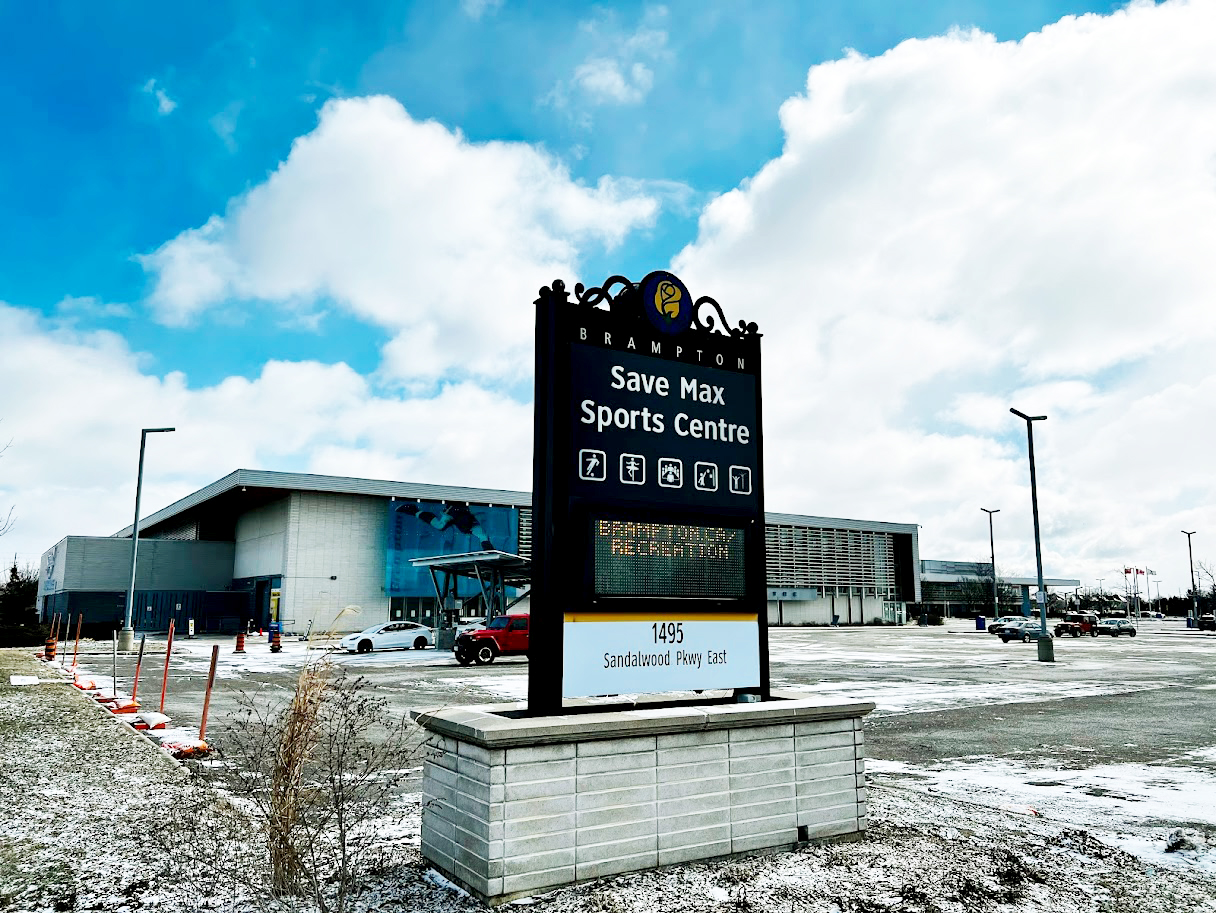
Brampton Soccer Centre

The Brampton Soccer Centre is a soccer-specific sports venue and recreation centre in Brampton, Ontario, Canada. Inaugurated on June 25, 2007, it was known as Save Max Sports Centre from 2020 to 2026. It is located in the neighbourhood of Springdale.

== Background ==
The venue was first proposed by Ward 9 & 10 Councillor Garnett Manning, with Mayor Susan Fennell and other Brampton city councillors later supporting the idea of a new recreation centre on the southwest corner of Dixie Road and Sandalwood Parkway. The initial concept for the facility was to host ice hockey, basketball, volleyball, and soccer. Mayor Fennell reviewed the plans and sought a shift toward rendering the building a soccer-only facility. The facility was constructed by the Atlas Corporation at the cost of $26.9 million. Outside the venue, there are four outdoor soccer fields with two overlapping cricket pitches, basketball courts, and a playground with a splashpad. Inside, there are four indoor soccer fields, community rooms, a snack bar, a gymnasium, and a dance studio. The facility was designed and developed by the City of Brampton and is accessible to facility users of all ages. The centre is used by four major Brampton soccer clubs: Brampton Adult Soccer, Brampton Youth Soccer Club, Brampton East Youth Soccer Club, and Brams United Girls Soccer Club. The centre also hosts pick-up soccer and summer camps organized by the city. The venue is credited for the growth of soccer in the city.
