= Bloor/Gladstone Library =

Library in Toronto, Canada

Coordinates: 43.659913°N 79.434017°W

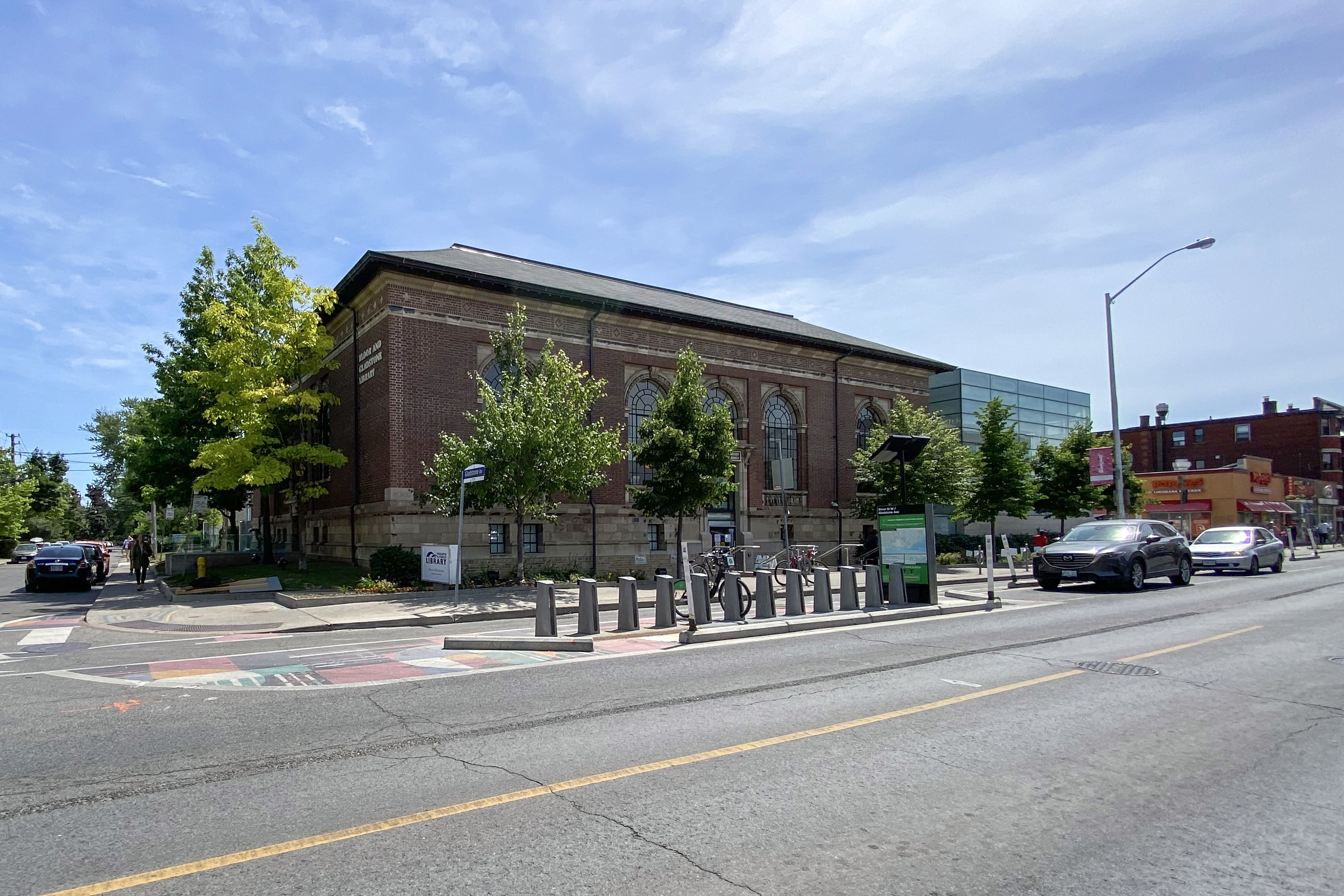
- Established: 1913
- Branch of: Toronto Public Library

Collection
- Items collected: books, music, cds, periodicals, maps, genealogical archives, business directories, local history

Other information
- Public transit access: Dufferin station
- Website: Toronto Public Library: Bloor-Gladstone branch

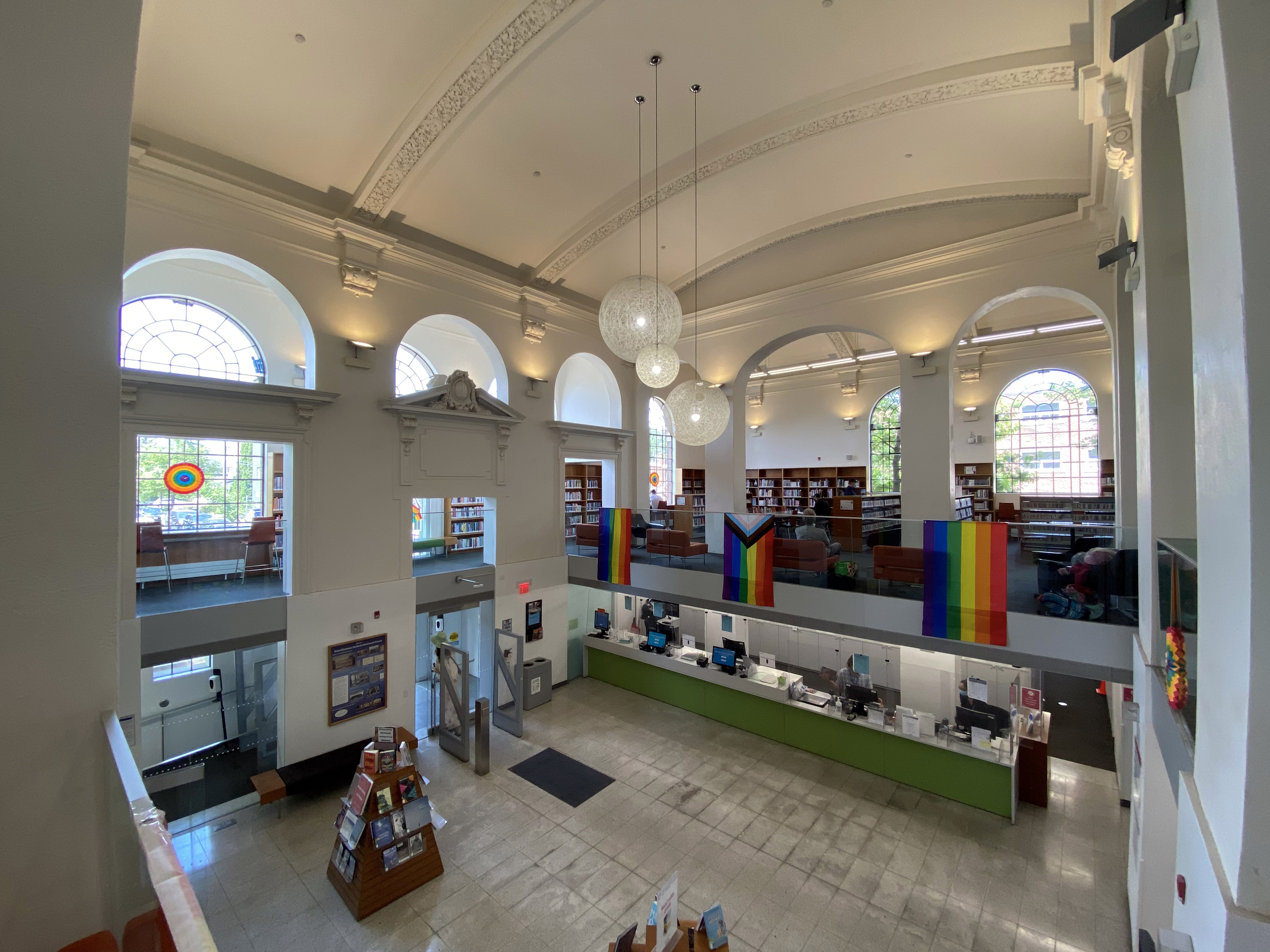
Library interior

The Bloor/Gladstone Library is a branch of Toronto Public Library, located at 1101 Bloor Street West, Toronto, Ontario.

== Services ==
- Information and reference services
- Access to full text databases
- Community information
- Internet access
- Reader's advisory services
- Programs for children, youth and adults
- Delivery to homebound individuals
- Interlibrary loan
- Free downloadable audiobooks

== Architecture ==
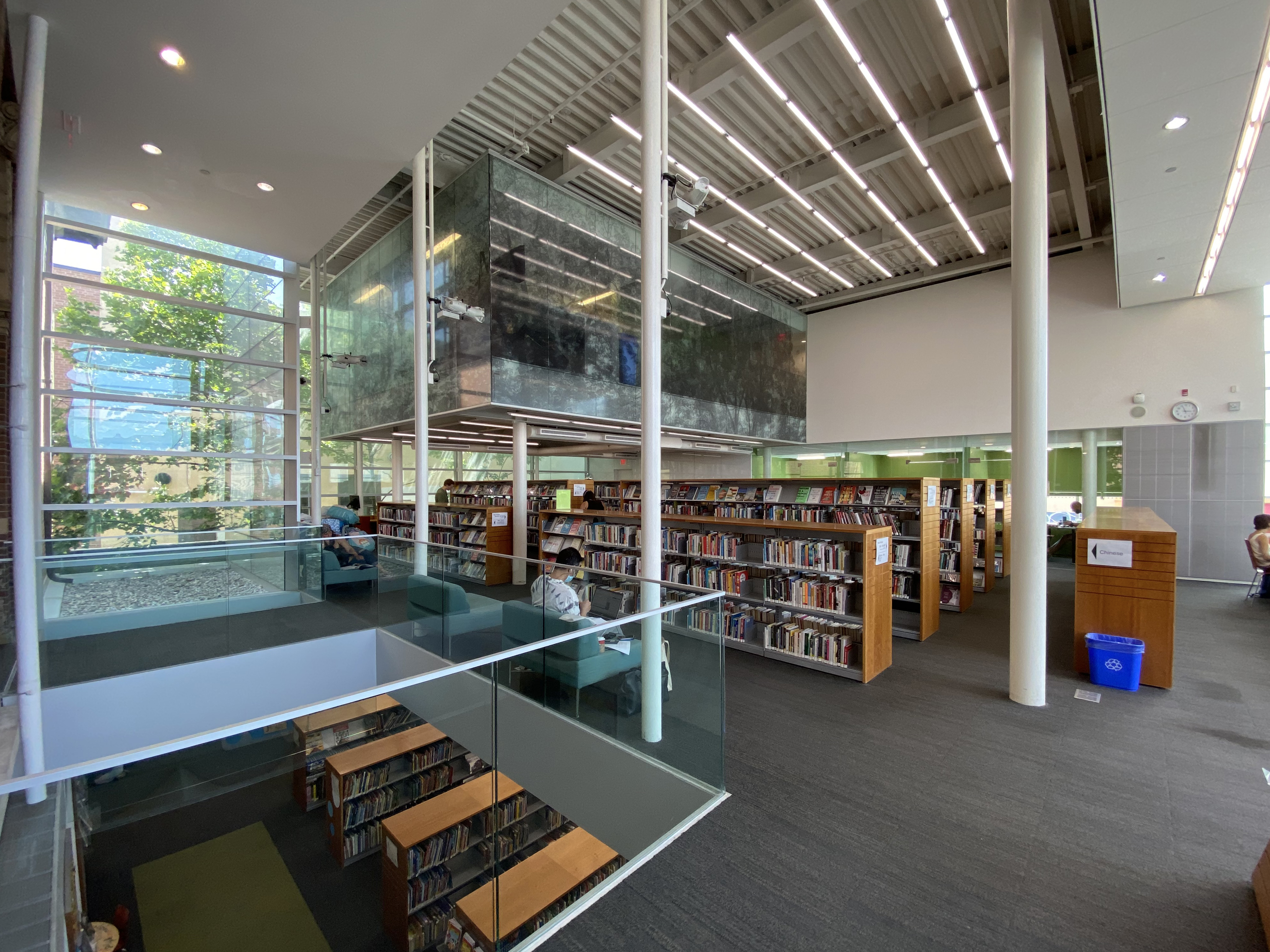
"glass box" addition of the library completed in 2009

It was designed by Chapman and McGiffin Architects. Its construction started in 1912, ended in 1913 and the library opened for business on October 25, 1913. The original building was inspired by the classical architectural tradition and incorporates many elements of the Italian Renaissance architecture, such as round arches, supported by pilasters with extruding head stones on the façade; decorative pediments that echoed Ancient Greek Temples; ornamentation, which included non-structural brackets on the interior, two fireplaces with sculpted angel faces on both sides of each fireplace, natural motifs, etc.; a slightly hipped roof with what seems like an entablature, created with the use of brick ornamentation and terra cotta veneer; the attempt to create a "perfect" square-shaped plan of the library with barrel-vaulted ceilings and a courtyard. The library has undergone two major renovations. The first was done in 1975–1976 by architects Howard V. Walker and Howard D. Chapman, which mainly affected the plan of the library since the facade remained virtually intact. The second renovation was from 2006 to 2009. The architects involved in this project were RDH Architects, Shoalts and Zaback, and ERA. As a result of this renovation, the library now has a "glass box" addition, its main entrance has been lowered by approximately half a metre and some of the interior features, such as the staircase, have been altered for functional reasons.
