= St. Marguerite d'Youville Secondary School =

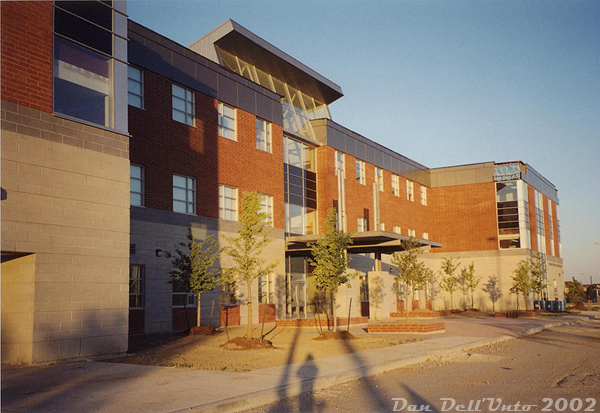

Location
- 10815 Dixie Road; Brampton, Ontario, L6R 2W5; Canada; 43.7523°N 79.7766°W

Information
- School type: Separate secondary school
- Motto: To Trust, To Risk, To Love, To Serve
- Religious affiliation: Roman Catholic
- Founded: 1995
- School board: Dufferin-Peel Catholic District School Board
- Superintendent: Adrian Scigliano
- Area trustee: Shawn Xavier Darryl D'Souza
- Principal: Rob Weatherbee
- Grades: 9 to 12
- Enrolment: 1200
- Language: English, programs include French
- Campus: Suburban
- Area: Springdale
- Colours: Blue and black
- Team name: Panther
- Website: www.dpcdsb.org/DYOUV

St. Marguerite d'Youville Secondary School (commonly referred to as d'Youville or abbreviated as d'Y) is a Catholic high school in Brampton, Ontario, Canada, in the Dufferin-Peel Catholic District School Board (DPCDSB).

== History ==
The present school building, located at 10815 Dixie Road in the Springdale neighbourhood of Brampton, was completed in 2002 and opened for classes in September of that year. It replaced an older, smaller facility at 115 Glenvale Boulevard.

The old school building, today home to Holy Name of Mary Catholic Secondary School (previously a holding school location known as the "Glenvale Campus"), began construction in 1975. It was originally occupied by St. Thomas Aquinas SS from September 1976 until they moved into a new larger school building nearby in 1992. After, Robert F. Hall CSS students that previously attended Notre Dame CSS occupied it from September 1992 until their new building in Caledon was complete. St. Marguerite d'Youville CSS was formed and commenced classes at the Glenvale location starting in September 1995, and continued to reside there until the end of the 2001/2002 school year. By this time, the small two level building was at capacity, with students being bussed in to the location from other parts of Brampton, numerous portables providing additional classroom space, and the potential for even more school enrolment as Brampton continued to expand to the north.

Back in 1999, the DPCDSB initially considered a plan with the public board to include St. Marguerite d'Youville (then searching for a new site) in a dual-school campus in the Springdale community. It would have been the first of five such facilities planned, in order to save on the costs of building new separate school facilities, according to studies conducted in 1997. This campus would have included both public and catholic schools using shared facilities, and also a community centre and park, and was to be located at the intersection of Sandalwood Parkway and Dixie Road. A number of student, security, vehicular congestion and school rivalry concerns were brought up with the plan, and it was ultimately voted down by Brampton's planning board in January 2000. Then-Mayor Peter Robertson called for the Ontario Education Minister to intervene, and accused the DPCDSB of bailing out due to a possible loss of identity on a campus with a public school. A representative from the DPCDSB however citied concerns with the pressing issue of overcrowding at their existing schools, and the ability of the board to build a new school on a separate site to the north quicker on their own than in a joint venture, which would take an extra year or longer to design and build.

Ultimately, a new building was built to house St. Marguerite d'Youville on the proposed northerly site, on the east side of Dixie Road North between Sandalwood Parkway and Countryside Drive. It was expected to accommodate roughly ~1500 students from the growing north central Brampton area. Initially the new Dixie Road building was on the outer reaches of development in Brampton in the Springdale community, but over the next few years more and more surrounding farmland was developed into residential neighbourhoods and public transit access was improved. As time went on, enrolment from the surrounding area increased and a number of portables were added to the new school grounds, on the east side of the building where a small field was.

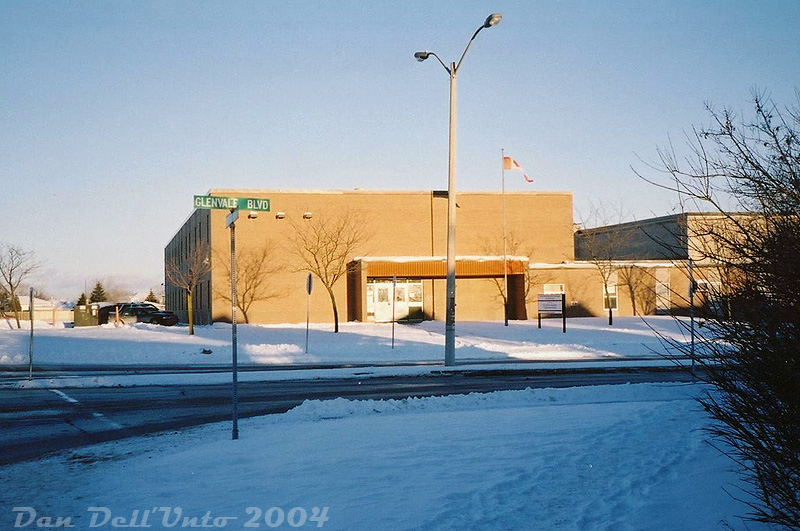
Original location of St. Marguerite d'Youville Catholic Secondary School on Glenvale Blvd

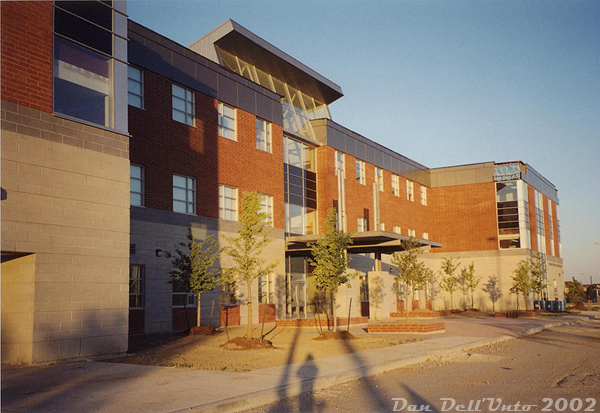
The new St. Marguerite d'Youville CSS under construction, during August 2002

Father Tobin Road, located to the immediate north of the current building, was named after a longtime chaplain and priest at the school, Father Jim Tobin, who retired at the end of the 2002/2003 school year. At first it was a small section of road stretching east from Dixie and ending past the north roadway entrance, just north of the track field. As the surrounding farmland was redeveloped into residential neighbourhoods, it was extended east and now reaches Mountainash Road.

== Facilities ==
Facilities include:

- 130-seat theater
- Triple gymnasium
- Full weight room
- Library
- Chapel
- Cafeteria
- Shop area for wood
- Dance studio
- Various classrooms specially equipped for STEM such as cosmetics, science STEM Lab and computer labs
- Track field with soccer goals
- 3 separate parking lots (one typically for teachers only)

== Programs and extracurriculars ==
Sports teams have always been popular at d'Youville, including soccer, basketball and football under the d'Youville Panthers banner.

There are Specialist High School Major (SHSM) program offered in Health Care, ICT, and Hospitality. The Regional STEM program at St. Marguerite d’Youville Catholic Secondary School began in September 2025 for incoming Grade 9 students. STEM focuses on Science, Technology, Engineering, and Mathematics. This early start allows students to build a strong foundation in these critical areas, preparing them for future academic and emerging career opportunities. The program offers various experiential learning opportunities, including: hands-on projects, certifications, field trips, and partnerships with local industries which provide real-world experience and problem solving skills. Enhancements such as access to STEM competitions, specialized workshops, and mentorships will set students up for success in high-demand fields. Students who complete all the requirements of the program will receive a STEM certificate at graduation.

== Notable alumni ==
- Tristan Thompson, basketball player
- Kenny Ejim, basketball player
- Nakas Onyeka, Canadian football player
- Ayo Akinola, Canadian football player

== See also ==
- Education in Ontario
- List of secondary schools in Ontario
