= Harold M. Brathwaite =

Barbadian-Canadian educator and school administrator (1940–2020)

Harold McDonald Brathwaite OOnt
- Born: June 1, 1940
- Died: May 31, 2020 (aged 79)
- Education: University of the West Indies; University of Bordeaux; McMaster University
- Occupations: Educator, school administrator

Harold McDonald Brathwaite (June 1, 1940 - May 31, 2020) was a Barbadian-Canadian educator and school administrator.

== Early life and education ==
Brathwaite was from Saint Michael, Barbados, where he was educated at St Giles' Primary School, Combermere School, and Harrison College. He moved to Jamaica for undergraduate study at the University of the West Indies, with a year abroad at the University of Lyon. He graduated from the University of the West Indies in 1965 and went on to earn a diplôme d'études supérieures from the University of Bordeaux and a master's degree in French from McMaster University. His 1969 master's thesis compared the works of André Gide and Charles Baudelaire.

== Career ==
He worked within the Halton School District as a teacher and administrator, and then as principal of M. M. Robinson High School, before moving to the Toronto Board of Education as Superintendent of French Language Schools in 1984 and then to the Peel District School Board as director of education in 1994. He retired in 2002. In 2003, he became senior advisor to the president of Seneca College and from 2004 to 2015 he was Executive Director of the Retired Teachers of Ontario. He also chaired the Nelson Mandela Children's Fund in Canada, and became a trustee of the Art Gallery of Toronto and a member of the Toronto Lands Corporation.

== Recognition ==
In 2006, Brathwaite was awarded the Order of Ontario "for his contributions to racial harmony and education" in Ontario, and in particular for "developing and guiding initiatives to assist at risk youth in the black community".

His other awards include the McMaster University Distinguished Alumnus Award, the Outstanding Educator Award of the Canadian Alliance of Black Educators, the 1995 Canadian Black Achievement Award, the 1998 Harry Jerome Award for Professional Excellence of the Black Business and Professional Association, the 2002 Arbor Award of the University of Toronto, and, in 2007, the People For Education's First Annual Egerton Ryerson Award for Contributions to Public Education.

The Harold M. Brathwaite Secondary School was named in his honour.
