= Kenny Ejim =

Canadian basketball player (1994–2022)

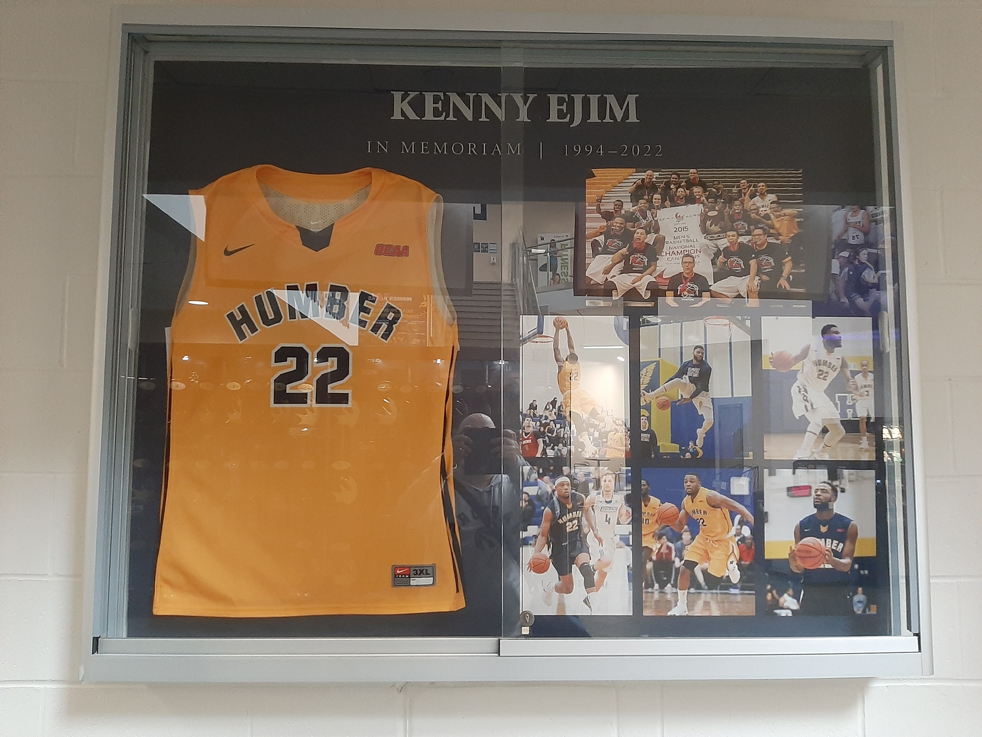
- Ejim's Humber College jersey and photos

Personal information
- Born: 3 December 1994 Toronto, Ontario, Canada
- Died: 14 February 2022 (aged 27) Manama, Bahrain
- Listed height: 1.97 m (6 ft 6 in)

Career information
- High school: St. Marguerite d'Youville (Brampton, Ontario)
- College: Humber (2014–2018)
- NBA draft: 2016: undrafted
- Playing career: 2018–2022
- Position: Power forward

Career history
- 2018: Aquimisa Laboratorios
- 2018–2019: Gijón Basket
- 2019–2020: Zornotza ST
- 2020: Saskatchewan Rattlers
- 2020–2021: CAM Enrique Soler
- 2021–2022: Hamilton Honey Badgers
- 2022: Al-Najma

Kenny Tobechi Ejim (3 December 1994 – 14 February 2022) was a Canadian professional basketball player.

== Playing career ==
Ejim began playing basketball in grade 7 having grown up playing soccer before that. A power forward, Ejim played professionally in Spain, Canada and Bahrain.

== Personal life ==
Ejim's three brothers Ryan, Melvin and Deon as well as his sister Yvonne all played basketball professionally.

== Death ==
Ejim died on 14 February 2022, at his apartment in Manama, Bahrain, while playing for Al-Najma of the Bahraini Premier League. An investigation ruled out foul play.

== See also ==
- List of basketball players who died during their careers
