= Brampton Library, Springdale branch =

Library building in Ontario, Canada

Coordinates: 43.7580°N 79.7613°W

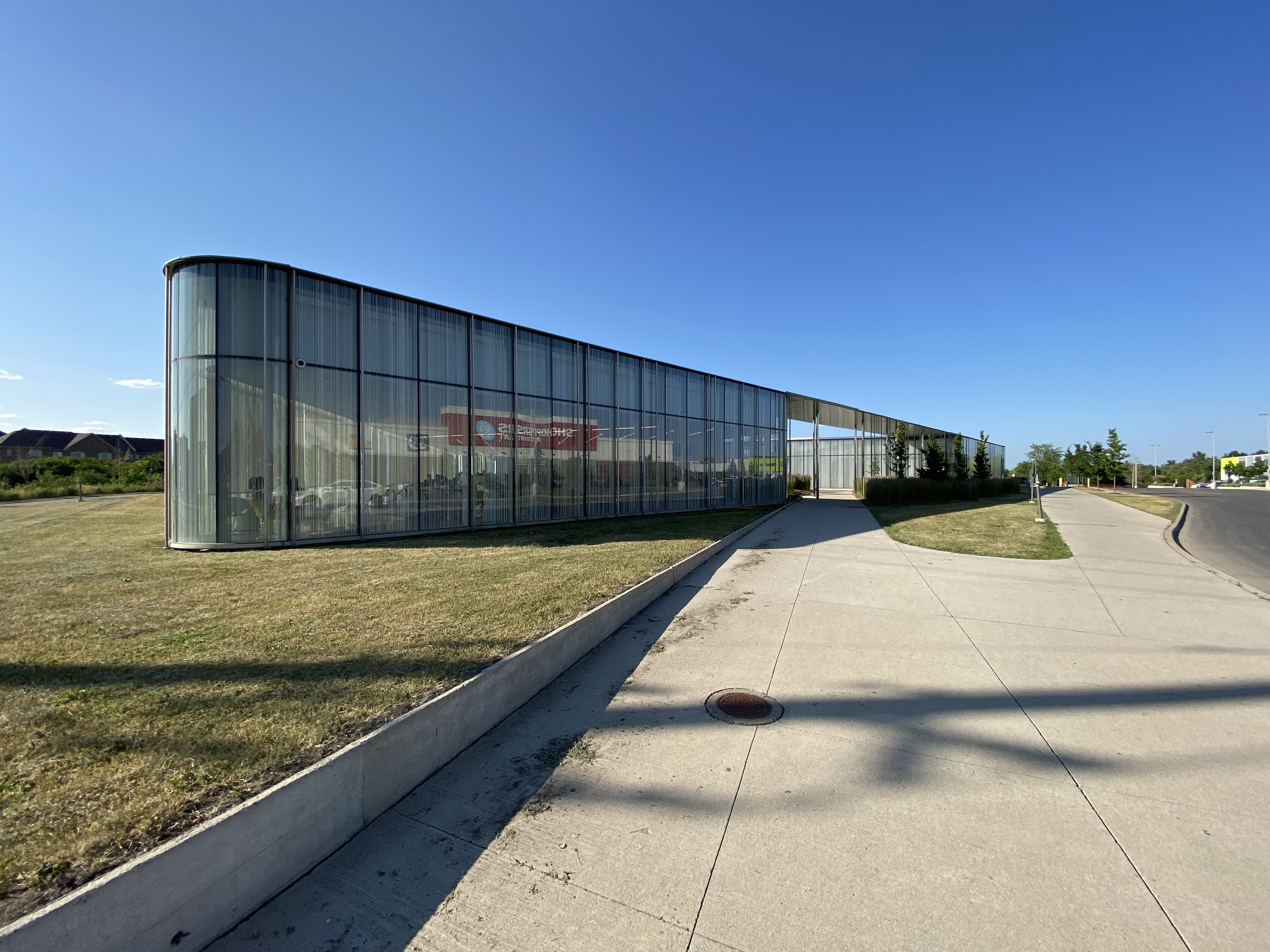
Exterior of Brampton Library Springdale

The Brampton Library, Springdale branch and Komagata Maru Park, designed by RDH Architects, is near the intersection of Bramalea Road and Sandalwood Parkway in Springdale, Brampton, Ontario, Canada. It is an example of " progressive organic architecture and urbanism that focuses on an experience set within the typical fabric of a North American suburb." Inaugurated in 2019, the opening of Brampton Library's Springdale Branch introduced a single storey structure. It rests on a triangular footprint of the library that optimizes the utilization of green areas.

This interactive design is also new to RDHA's portfolio of libraries as they typically consist of linear forms and straight edges. The main structure maintains the integrity of the site's natural landscape and circulation as the structure was situated near the street to enhance its visibility. The organic perimeter connects the building with courtyards, while the topography resembles the ceiling and the mountainous green roof that extends throughout the interior space and blends with the park landscape.

== History ==
Lead Architect Tyler Sharp fosters a sense of community regardless of one's background and age. In commemoration of the 1914 incident involving Canada's discriminatory immigration policies, the library was constructed, being a symbol of Canada's celebration of multiculturalism and immigration. The tragedy was the defining moment in naming Komagata Maru Park as 376 immigrants died on the steamship Komagata Maru due to restrictive immigration regulations in Canada. The City of Brampton intends to honour this incident by pushing the themes of immigration and cultural diversity into this new design.

== Architecture ==
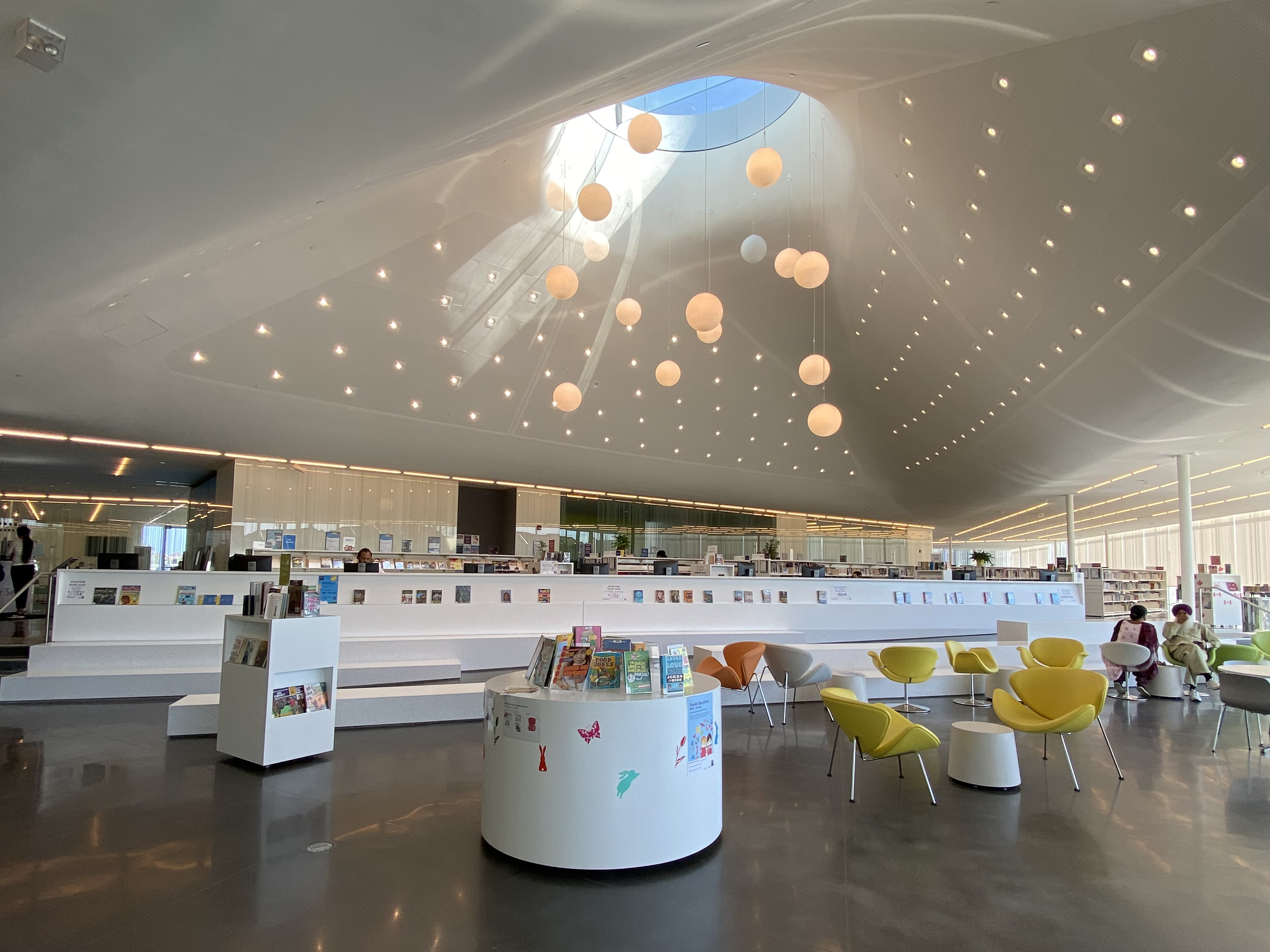
Interior of the library

Construction of the library was finished in the summer of 2019 with a construction cost of $16,670,000 and an area of 26000 sf. According to RDHA Architects, every component of the library is designed with a focus on nontraditional design while utilising traditional resources and expenditures.

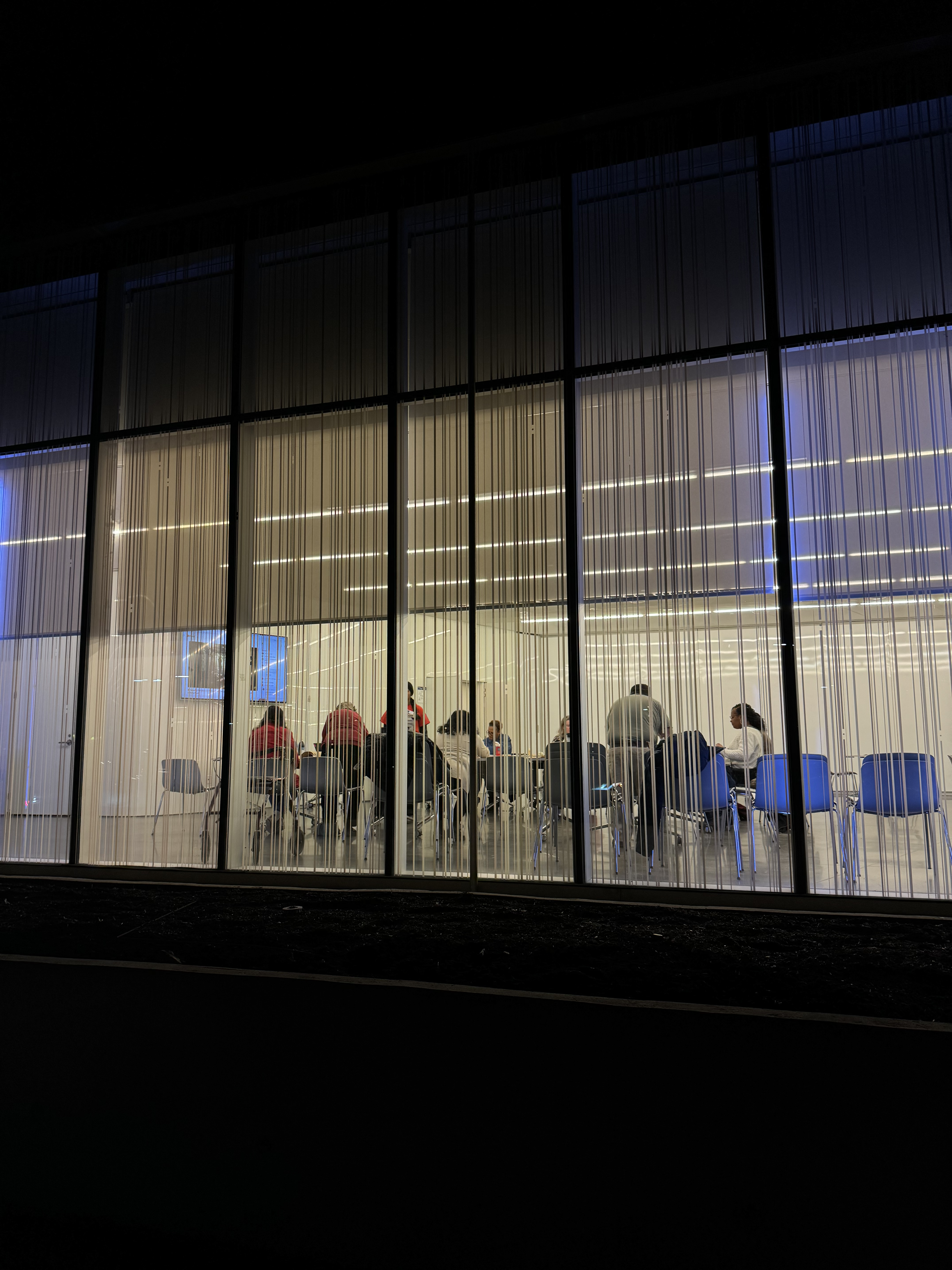
One of the Springdale Library's study spaces being used as a meeting room.

The building contains 20,000 square feet of library program with a 5,000-square-foot community multipurpose room and library space that is four times the size included in the interior program. The 2,400-square-metre complex includes an expansive multi-purpose room for meetings, exhibitions, and public gatherings. This building creates a space where the community can gather and learn. Within the rooms, various dividers, materials, and soundproofing modifications cater for an assortment of programs.

The naturally shaped perimeter that divides the building and courtyards to the undulating topography between the ceiling and steep green roof. The triangle plan is separated into three sections that consist of a children's area, a study space, and a community room, with glazed partitions providing nearly complete visual continuity between them. The windows of the structure are constructed as a functional abstraction. Both the floor and the roofscape rise and fall in the Centre with a ceiling that rises to an oculus 13 feet across, which is displayed outside as a massive mound wrapped in a green roof.

Another Oculus can be found in the children's area, where a thin-edged oval of drywall extends down from the ceiling, forming a half-enclosed space between the sky and the green-carpeted floor. Komagata Park has a series of terraced gardens for older users, a splash pad, and a children's playground. The splash pad and play area are themed on the word Imagine, with five-metre-high letters that are aligned in both horizontal and vertical planes, as an interactive feature for children.

=== Post occupancy ===
According to Lexi Sensicle, the Branch Manager of the Springdale Library, students from a local high school visited to explore sustainability in architecture which prompted a partnership with the Toronto and Region Conservation Authority (TRCA) to access a 3D printer to promote conservation. Through this initiative models that simulated snapping turtles were created and placed in nesting locations around the Heart Lake Conservation Area. It offers an array of programs and events tailored to cater to the interests and preferences of the local community. From storytelling sessions for children to language classes and workshops for adults, the library serves as an educational and recreational space for all.

== Sustainable approach ==
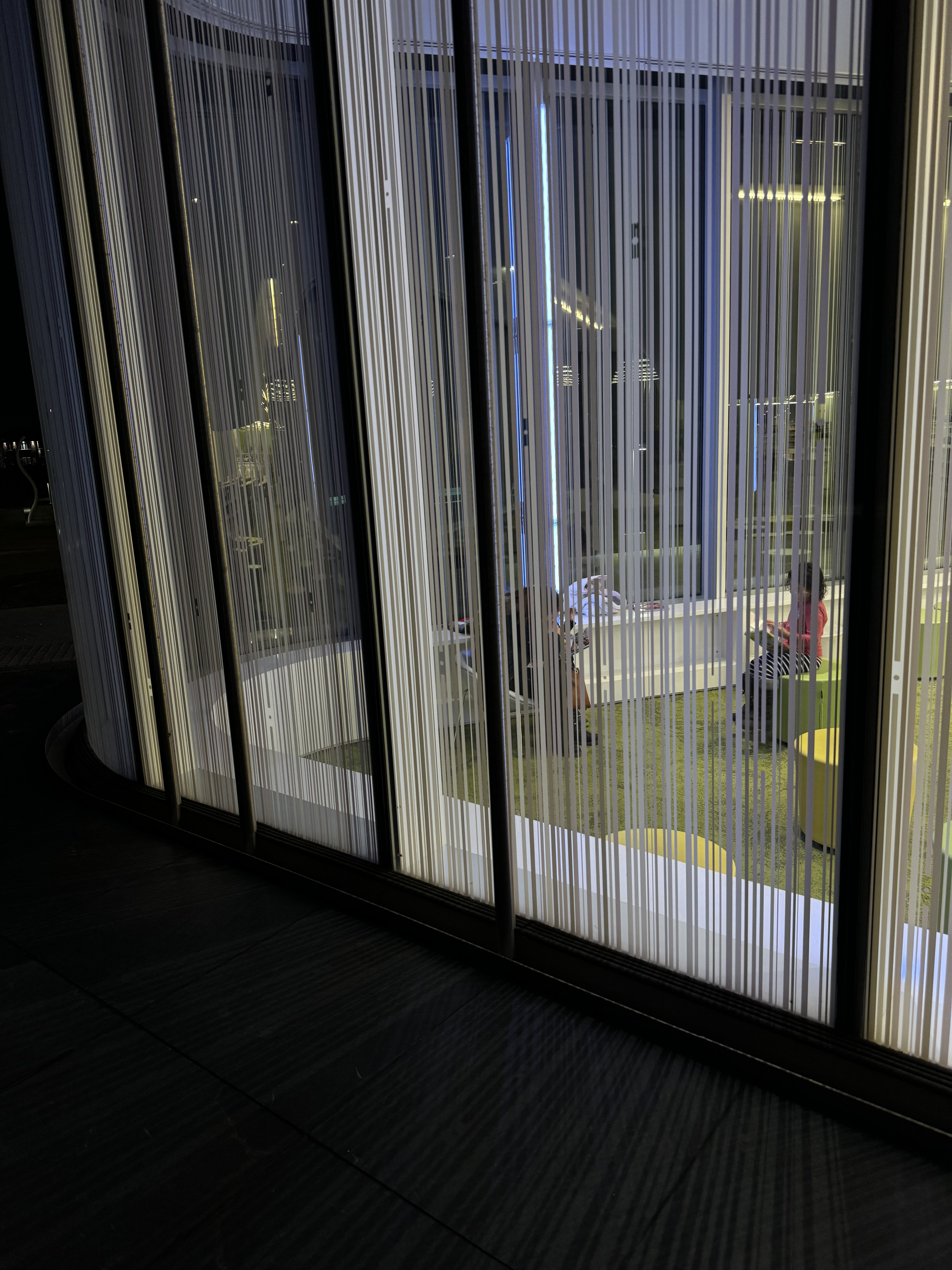
Custom solar-responsive ceramic frit pattern on the windows.

The Springdale Library and Komagata Park hold a LEED gold rating which was the targeted level of sustainability that the City of Brampton encouraged RDHA to achieve. Collaborating with Brady Peters, Tyler Sharp RDHA Design Principal created a solar-responsive ceramic frit pattern for the building's windows. This custom design expands and contracts to deal with varying degrees of solar radiation. According to Springdale's LEED scorecard, a substantial amount of focus was put on water efficiency, innovation in design, and regional priority as they were the categories that attained the maximum amount of points. Numerous initiatives were implemented such as geothermal heating and cooling; low VOC materials throughout; green roofs that strive to improve thermal insulation; and a rainwater collection system that provides grey water for use in toilets, reflecting pools, irrigation, the community splash pad, and bioswales which help to contribute to the overall resiliency of the building.

== Awards ==
- 2015 Canadian Architect Award for Design Excellence
- 2019 OLA Library Building Award
- 2019 CISC Award of Excellence
- 2019 Brampton Urban Design Award of Excellence
- 2020 RAIC National Urban Design Certificate of Merit
- 2020 ALA/IIDA Library Interior Design Award
- 2020 Chicago Athenaeum International Architecture Award
- 2020 Architecture MasterPrize Award, including a "Best of the Best" distinction
- 2020 Canadian Interiors Best of Canada Award
- 2020 Governor General's Medal in Architecture
- 2021 Architizer A+Awards Winner
- 2022 Miles Crown Prize Nominee
- 2022 ALA/IIDA Award of Excellence
- 2022 OAA Design Excellence Award
- 2022 Lieutenant Governor's Award
