= Harold M. Brathwaite Secondary School =

Location
- 415 Great Lakes Drive; Brampton, Ontario, L6R 2Z4; Canada; 43°44′23″N 79°46′14″W

Information
- School type: High school
- Motto: Dream, Believe, Succeed
- Religious affiliation: Public-secondary
- Founded: 2003
- School board: Peel District School Board
- Superintendent: Neerja Punjabi
- Area trustee: Balbir Sohi
- School number: 943916
- Principal: Lola Gayle
- Grades: 9-12
- Enrolment: 1,744 (September 2021)
- Language: English
- Colours: Purple, silver and black
- Mascot: Blizzard The Bear
- Team name: Blizzards
- Website: haroldmbrathwaite.peelschools.org

Harold M. Brathwaite Secondary School is a public high school located in Brampton, Ontario, Canada. The school is named after Harold M. Brathwaite (d.2020), a former director of education of the Peel District School Board. Harold M. Brathwaite offers the International Baccalaureate program.

== Notable alumni ==
- Anthony Bennett, basketball player

== See also ==
- Education in Ontario
- List of secondary schools in Ontario
