= Anthony Bennett (basketball) =

Canadian basketball player (born 1993)

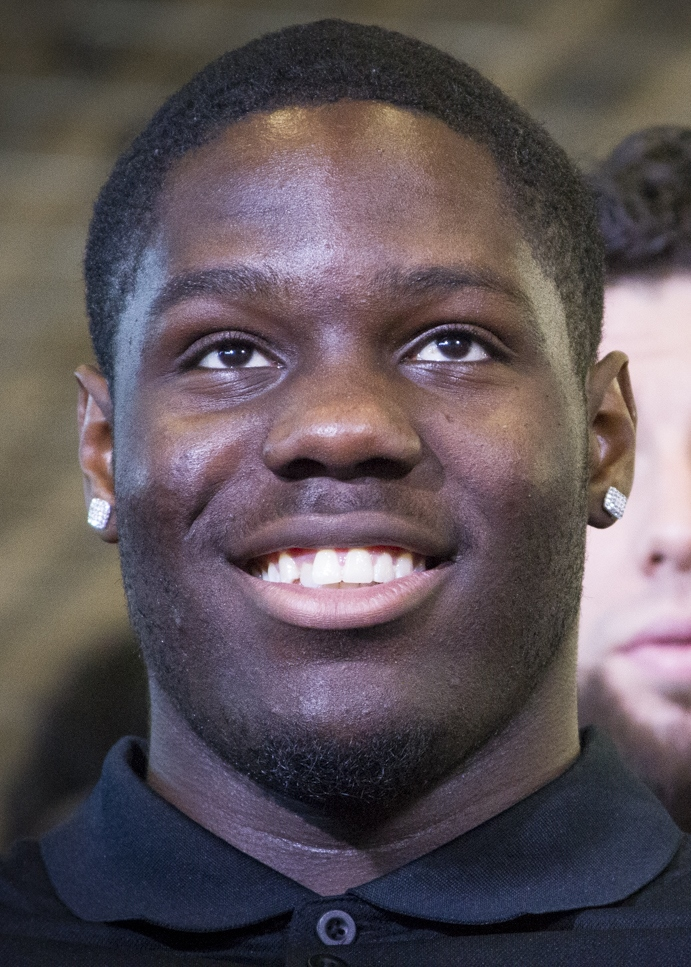
- Bennett in 2013

Al-Najma
- Position: Power forward
- League: Bahraini Premier League

Personal information
- Born: March 14, 1993 (age 33) Toronto, Ontario, Canada
- Listed height: 6 ft 8 in (2.03 m)
- Listed weight: 245 lb (111 kg)

Career information
- High school: Harold M. Brathwaite (Brampton, Ontario, Canada); Findlay Prep (Henderson, Nevada, U.S.)
- College: UNLV (2012–2013)
- NBA draft: 2013: 1st round, 1st overall pick
- Drafted by: Cleveland Cavaliers
- Playing career: 2013–present

Career history
- 2013–2014: Cleveland Cavaliers
- 2014–2015: Minnesota Timberwolves
- 2015–2016: Toronto Raptors
- 2015–2016: →Raptors 905
- 2016–2017: Brooklyn Nets
- 2016: →Long Island Nets
- 2017: Fenerbahçe
- 2017: Northern Arizona Suns
- 2017–2018: Maine Red Claws
- 2018–2019: Agua Caliente Clippers
- 2021–2022: Hapoel Jerusalem
- 2022: Kaohsiung Steelers
- 2022–2023: Hsinchu JKO Lioneers
- 2023: Kaohsiung 17LIVE Steelers
- 2024–2025: Formosa Dreamers
- 2026–present: Al-Najma

Career highlights
- EuroLeague champion (2017); AP honorable mention All-American (2013); MWC Freshman of the Year (2013); First-team All-MWC (2013); McDonald's All-American (2012)
- Stats at NBA.com
- Stats at Basketball Reference
Medals
Men's basketball
Representing Canada
FIBA AmeriCup
| Bronze medal – third place | 2015 Mexico City |
Pan American Games
| Silver medal – second place | 2015 Toronto |
FIBA World U17 Cup
| Bronze medal – third place | 2010 Hamburg | Under-17 |
FIBA Americas U16 Championship
| Bronze medal – third place | 2009 Mendoza | Under-16 |

Anthony Harris Bennett (born March 14, 1993) is a Canadian professional basketball player for Al-Najma of the Bahraini Premier League. He played college basketball for the University of Nevada, Las Vegas (UNLV) for one year. He was the first overall pick in the 2013 NBA draft by the Cleveland Cavaliers, becoming the first Canadian to be drafted number one overall. He played only four seasons in the NBA, averaging 4.4 points per game, and has been named the worst number-one pick in league history.

== Early life ==
Bennett was born on March 14, 1993, in Toronto, Ontario. He was raised in the city's Jane and Finch neighbourhood, and in nearby Brampton, to where he moved at age ten. He is the son of Edith Bennett, a nurse who is originally from Jamaica, and Delroy Harris. He also has an older sister, Danielle, and an older brother, Sheldon. Edith raised her family as a single mother, working two jobs, at a hospital and a mental health facility. As a teenager in Jamaica, his mother ran track and field and played netball.

Bennett attended Harold M. Brathwaite Secondary School in Brampton. At age 16, he relocated to Beckley, West Virginia, to play basketball for Mountain State Academy. After the school closed a year later, Bennett moved to Henderson, Nevada, to play for the basketball preparatory academy Findlay Prep. He was the #1 forward and the #7 player overall in the high school class of 2012 according to ESPNU 100, the #7 player by Scout.com, and the #7 player by Rivals.com.

While initially receiving interest from many teams, Bennett narrowed down his college choices to Oregon and UNLV. He committed to UNLV under head coach Dave Rice on May 12, 2012.

== College career ==
During the 2012–13 UNLV Runnin' Rebels basketball season, Bennett played 35 games. While mostly starting at power forward, he would occasionally play small forward. He averaged 16.1 points and 8.1 rebounds a game despite only averaging 27.1 minutes a game due to injury. He shot 53.3% from the field overall and 37.5% from three-point range. He was extremely efficient in college, averaging a PER of 28.3. Halfway through the season, Bennett was plagued with a shoulder injury. His minutes were cut to allow him to rest and he even came off the bench in a few games. UNLV received an at-large berth to the NCAA tournament and lost in the Round of 64 to California.

In April 2013, Bennett declared for the NBA draft, foregoing his final three years of college eligibility. In May 2013, he underwent elective surgery for sleep apnea and asthma.

== Professional career ==
=== Cleveland Cavaliers (2013–2014) ===
Bennett was one of thirteen players invited to the green room for the 2013 NBA draft, meaning he was expected to be chosen as a lottery pick. In what CBC described as "a stunning turn of events that surprised even" Bennett, he was selected first overall by the Cleveland Cavaliers, making him the first Canadian ever to be selected first overall in an NBA draft. He told the media that "I didn't really have any idea who's going No. 1 or who was going No. 2. I heard everything was up for grabs. But I'm just really happy, glad that I have this opportunity, and I've just got to thank God for everything."

On August 20, 2013, Bennett signed a 2-year, $10.9 million rookie scale contract with the Cleveland Cavaliers. After producing multiple mediocre performances to begin his rookie season, he was ranked by some as one of the worst first overall picks in recent memory. He did not score a field goal until his fifth NBA game, and missed his first 16 shot attempts in 43 minutes of playing time.

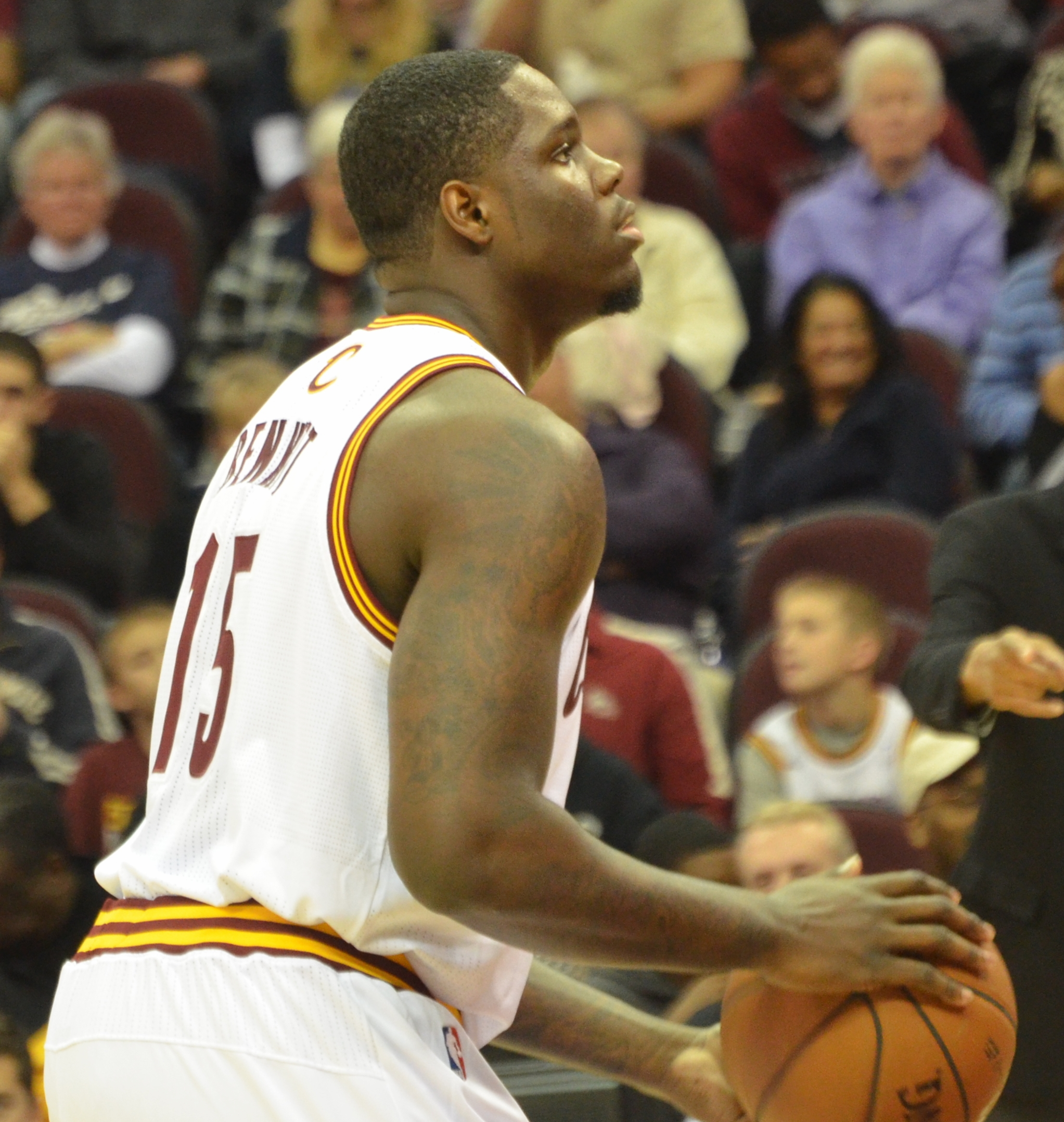
Bennett taking a free throw for the Cavaliers in October 2013

On January 28, 2014, Bennett recorded 15 points and 8 rebounds in a 100–89 loss to the New Orleans Pelicans. It was the first double-figure scoring game in his NBA career, coming after 33 games—three times as long as any previous No. 1 overall pick. Almost two-thirds of all previous top picks scored in double digits in their first game. On February 11, 2014, Bennett recorded his first career double-double with 19 points and 10 rebounds in a 109–99 win over the Sacramento Kings. For the 2013–2014 season, he played 52 games while averaging 4.2 points and 3.0 rebounds in 12.8 minutes per game.

In July 2014, Bennett joined the Cavaliers for the 2014 NBA Summer League where he averaged 13.3 points in four games.

=== Minnesota Timberwolves (2014–2015) ===
On August 23, 2014, Bennett was traded to the Minnesota Timberwolves in a three-team trade involving the Cavaliers and the Philadelphia 76ers.

On October 19, 2014, the Timberwolves exercised their third-year team option on Bennett's rookie scale contract, extending the contract through the 2015–16 season. On November 21, 2014, he scored a career-high 20 points in a 121–92 loss to the San Antonio Spurs. On February 21, 2015, he was ruled out for two weeks due to an injured right ankle he sustained the day before playing against the Phoenix Suns. After recovering from the injury, Bennett appeared in just four more games to finish the 2014–2015 season. In 57 games (three starts) for the Timberwolves, he averaged career highs of 5.2 points, 3.8 rebounds and 15.7 minutes per game.

On September 23, 2015, Bennett was waived by the Timberwolves via a contract buyout.

=== Toronto Raptors (2015–2016) ===
On September 28, 2015, Bennett signed a one-year, veteran's minimum deal with his hometown Toronto Raptors. He made his debut with them on October 30, recording three rebounds and one steal in a 113–103 win over the Boston Celtics. On December 20, Bennett requested that the team send him to Raptors 905 of the NBA Development League. He played for Raptors 905 in their game against the Delaware 87ers, recording 13 points and 4 rebounds in a 105–94 win, becoming the NBA's first No. 1 overall pick to play in the D-League. He returned to Toronto later that night for their game against the Sacramento Kings. He later received three more assignments to Raptors 905. On March 1, 2016, he was waived by the Raptors. Bennett's love for the game was questioned during his tenure in Toronto, and the organization grew increasingly frustrated with his inability to grasp the cut-throat world of the NBA despite their attempts to work with him.

=== Brooklyn Nets (2016–2017) ===
On July 14, 2016, Bennett signed a 2-year, $2.1 million contract with the Brooklyn Nets. He made his debut for the Nets in their third game of the season on October 29, scoring nine points in 18 minutes off the bench in a 110–108 loss to the Milwaukee Bucks. On November 18, he scored a season-high 12 points in a 124–105 loss to the Oklahoma City Thunder. On November 27, he was assigned to Brooklyn's D-League affiliate, the Long Island Nets. He was recalled by Brooklyn prior to their game later that night. He was reassigned to Long Island on November 28, and was recalled the next day. On December 3, he made his first start of the season and had 7 points and a career-high 14 rebounds in a 112–103 loss to the Milwaukee Bucks. On January 9, 2017, he was waived by the Nets.

=== Fenerbahçe (2017) ===
On January 13, 2017, Bennett signed with Fenerbahçe of the Turkish Basketball Super League on a 1+1 contract. In 10 EuroLeague games he averaged 1.2 points per game. Fenerbahçe went on to win their first ever EuroLeague title in 2017, beating out Olympiakos 80–64 in the championship game. On May 25, 2017, he was released by Fenerbahçe.

=== Northern Arizona Suns (2017) ===
On September 22, 2017, Bennett signed with the Phoenix Suns. On October 11, 2017, he was waived by the Suns. Later that month, he joined the Northern Arizona Suns of the NBA G League. On November 19, 2017, he temporarily left the team to join the Canadian national team for the 2019 FIBA Basketball World Cup qualification. He rejoined Northern Arizona on November 29.

=== Maine Red Claws (2017–2018) ===
On December 28, 2017, Bennett was traded to the Maine Red Claws alongside a third-round pick for the player rights of Wesley Saunders and a second-round pick.

=== Agua Caliente Clippers (2018–2019) ===
In October 2018, Bennett was traded to the Agua Caliente Clippers in exchange for James Michael McAdoo and a third-round draft pick.

=== Hapoel Jerusalem (2021–2022) ===
On July 12, 2019, Bennett signed a one-year, $1.7 million deal with the Houston Rockets. However, he was waived on October 9 after undergoing arthroscopic knee surgery.

In May 2021, he signed with Cangrejeros de Santurce of the Puerto Rican Baloncesto Superior Nacional. On July 7, the club announced that they had terminated Bennett's contract to make room for Dante Cunningham.

On August 25, 2021, Bennett signed with Hapoel Jerusalem of the Israeli Basketball Premier League (IBSL). On October 5, Bennett made his debut, logging a team-high 22 points, 8 rebounds, and one assist in 23 minutes of play. On October 10, it was announced that Bennett's contract would be extended until the end of the season, contrary to previous rumours that he was leaving the team. On January 2, 2022, he was waived. In eight games, he averaged 6.3 points and 3.3 rebounds in 12.9 minutes per game.

=== Kaohsiung Steelers (2022) ===
On February 9, 2022, Bennett joined the Kaohsiung Steelers of the Taiwanese P. League+. The deal made him the highest drafted player in the NBA to play in Taiwan professionally.

=== Hsinchu JKO Lioneers (2022–2023) ===
On August 19, 2022, Bennett signed to Hsinchu JKO Lioneers for the 2022–23 season.

On August 1, 2023, Bennett joined the Goyang Sono Skygunners of the Korean Basketball League. He left the team in mid September prior to the start of the season due to personal reasons.

=== Formosa Dreamers (2024–2025) ===
On December 24, 2024, Bennett signed with the Formosa Dreamers of the Taiwan Professional Basketball League (TPBL). On March 26, 2025, Formosa Dreamers terminated the contract relationship with Bennett.

=== Al-Najma (2025–present) ===
On April 28, 2025, Bennett signed with Al-Najma of the Bahraini Premier League.

== National team career ==
Bennett participated in the 2009 FIBA Americas Under-16 Championship and 2010 FIBA Under-17 World Championship, helping Canada win a bronze medal in each tournament. In the 2010 tournament, he was a teammate of Andrew Wiggins, the number one overall pick in the 2014 NBA draft and his former teammate on the Timberwolves.

In July 2015, Bennett was named to the Canadian national team roster for the 2015 Pan American Games. Playing in his hometown of Toronto, Bennett helped Canada win the silver medal with four victories, including an upset win over the United States in the semi-final, before losing in the final to Brazil. Bennett averaged 15.6 points and 10.4 rebounds per game in the tournament.

== Player profile ==
When he was drafted, Bennett drew comparisons to Larry Johnson, a former UNLV great, NBA All-Star, and number one overall pick in the 1991 NBA draft.

== Career statistics ==
Legend
| GP | Games played | GS | Games started | MPG | Minutes per game |
| FG% | Field-goal percentage | 3P% | 3-point field-goal percentage | FT% | Free-throw percentage |
| RPG | Rebounds per game | APG | Assists per game | SPG | Steals per game |
| BPG | Blocks per game | PPG | Points per game | PIR | Performance index rating |
| **Bold** | Career high |

=== NBA ===
==== Regular season ====
| Year | Team | GP | GS | MPG | FG% | 3P% | FT% | RPG | APG | SPG | BPG | PPG |
|---|---|---|---|---|---|---|---|---|---|---|---|---|
| 2013–14 | Cleveland | 52 | 0 | 12.8 | .356 | .245 | .638 | 3.0 | .3 | .4 | .2 | 4.2 |
| 2014–15 | Minnesota | **57** | **3** | **15.7** | **.421** | **.304** | .641 | **3.8** | **.8** | **.5** | **.3** | **5.2** |
| 2015–16 | Toronto | 19 | 0 | 4.4 | .296 | .214 | **.900** | 1.2 | .0 | .3 | .0 | 1.5 |
| 2016–17 | Brooklyn | 23 | 1 | 11.5 | .413 | .271 | .722 | 3.4 | .5 | .2 | .1 | 5.0 |
| Career | | 151 | 4 | 12.6 | .392 | .261 | .670 | 3.1 | .5 | .4 | .2 | 4.4 |

=== EuroLeague ===
| † | Denotes seasons in which Bennett won the EuroLeague |

| Year | Team | GP | GS | MPG | FG% | 3P% | FT% | RPG | APG | SPG | BPG | PPG | PIR |
|---|---|---|---|---|---|---|---|---|---|---|---|---|---|
| 2016–17† | Fenerbahçe | 10 | 4 | 6.3 | .263 | .182 | — | .9 | .2 | .3 | .1 | 1.2 | 0.6 |
| Career | | 10 | 4 | 6.3 | .263 | .182 | — | .9 | .2 | .3 | .1 | 1.2 | 0.6 |

=== IBSL ===
| Year | Team | GP | GS | MPG | FG% | 3P% | FT% | RPG | APG | SPG | BPG | PPG |
|---|---|---|---|---|---|---|---|---|---|---|---|---|
| 2021–22 | Hapoel Jerusalem | 8 | 1 | 12.9 | .514 | .440 | .333 | 3.3 | .9 | .5 | .0 | 6.3 |
| Career | | 8 | 1 | 12.9 | .514 | .440 | .333 | 3.3 | .9 | .5 | .0 | 6.3 |

=== College ===
| Year | Team | GP | GS | MPG | FG% | 3P% | FT% | RPG | APG | SPG | BPG | PPG |
|---|---|---|---|---|---|---|---|---|---|---|---|---|
| 2012–13 | UNLV | 35 | 32 | 27.1 | .533 | .375 | .701 | 8.1 | 1.0 | .7 | 1.2 | 16.1 |

== See also ==
- List of Canadians in the National Basketball Association
