= VJAA =

American architectural firm

VJAA is an American architectural firm based in Minneapolis, Minnesota. The firm is the recipient of the National American Institute of Architects Firm Award (2012). VJAA was founded in 1995 and is led by its two Design Partners Vincent James FAIA and Jennifer Yoos FAIA; with Nathan Knutson FAIA, Managing Principal. Select projects include the Lindsay Boathouse at Upper Canada College in Toronto, Fraser Hall Chemistry Undergraduate Teaching Laboratory Facility at the University of Minnesota, the Charles Hostler Student Center at the American University of Beirut, the Guesthouse at Saint John's Abbey, 825 Arts and the Minnesota Museum of American Art in St. Paul, the Walker Library in Minneapolis and the Welland International Flatwater Centre for the Toronto 2015 Pan Am games. The firm's work has been published in Architecture, Architectural Record, Architecture Review (UK), A+U (Japan), The New York Times, Perspecta, Praxis, and in a number of books in the United States and in France, Germany, the Netherlands, Spain, the United Kingdom, India, China, and South America.

== Awards ==
VJAA has received 27 national design awards, including fourteen National American Institute of Architects Awards of which eight are National American Institute of Architects Honor Awards, six Progressive Architecture Awards, an AN 2025 Best of Design Award, and two American Institute of Architects/Committee on the Environment Top 10 Green Building Awards. In 2010, Architect magazine ranked VJAA first in the United States for design recognition. In 2001, the firm received the Award in Architecture from the American Academy of Arts and Letters.

== Partners ==
Vincent James (born 1952, Minneapolis, Minnesota) first practiced in firms in New York and Minneapolis before founding VJAA in 1995. He taught Architecture at Harvard (2000-2007), MIT, at IIT as the Morgenstern Chair and Visiting Professor, at the University of Minnesota as a Cass Gilbert Professor, at Cooper Union as the NADAA Visiting Professor, was the John G. Williams Fellow and Distinguished Professor at the University of Arkansas, and Tulane University as the Favrot Visiting Chair. In 1998 he was included in the Emerging Voices series by the Architectural League of New York. Vincent James received his undergraduate and Master of Architecture degrees from the University of Wisconsin.

Jennifer Yoos (born 1965, Minnesota) received her M. Arch. in Architecture and Urbanism from the Design Research Lab (DRL) at the Architectural Association (AA) in London and her professional degree in Architecture from the University of Minnesota (B.Arch). She practiced in Minneapolis and in London and worked with Vincent James beginning in 1988, they have been in practice together as design partners since 1997.

In 2003 Jennifer Yoos was awarded a Loeb Fellowship in Urban and Environmental Studies at Harvard Graduate School of Design. She has taught at Washington University in St. Louis as the Ruth and Norman Moore Visiting Professor, Cooper Union as the NADAA Visiting Professor and the University of Arkansas as the John G. Williams Fellow and Distinguished Professor. Yoos was Head of the School of Architecture at the University of Minnesota from 2020-2026 where she is now a Professor of Architecture.

Vincent James and Jennifer Yoos are co-authors of a monograph on their work published by Princeton Architectural Press as well as their book Parallel Cities: The Multilevel Metropolis (2016) with Andrew Blauvelt and the Walker Art Center. They were each elevated to the AIA College of Fellows in the category of design.

== Significant works ==
- Fraser Hall, Chemistry Undergraduate Teaching Laboratory Facility at the University of Minnesota, Minneapolis, Minnesota, (2025)
- Lindsay Boathouse at Upper Canada College, Toronto, Ontario, Canada, (2023)
- 825 Arts, St. Paul, Minnesota, (2023)
- Welland International Flatwater Centre, Toronto 2015 Pan Am Games, (2014)
- Walker Library, Minneapolis, Minnesota, (2014)
- Hostler Student Recreation Center and Corniche Frontage, Beirut, Lebanon, (2008)
- Church Pavilion and Blessed Sacrament Chapel, Saint John's Abbey and Monastery, Collegeville, Minnesota, (2007)
- Abbey Guesthouse, Saint John's Abbey and Monastery, Collegeville, Minnesota, Completed (2007)
- The Lavin-Bernick Center for University Life, Tulane University, New Orleans, Louisiana, (2007)
- University of Wisconsin-Madison Crewhouse, Madison, Wisconsin, (2004)
- Minneapolis Rowing Club Boathouse, Minneapolis, Minnesota, (2001)

== Resources ==
- Thermally Active Surfaces in Architecture by Kiel Moe. New York: Princeton Architectural Press.
- Ecological Architecture by Chris Van Uffelen. Berlin: Markus Sebastian Braun.
- Integrated Design in Contemporary Architecture by Kiel Moe. New York: Princeton Architectural Press.
- Key Contemporary Buildings by Rob Gregory. London: Lawrence King Publishing.
- VJAA (Monograph) Introduction by Hashim Sarkis. New York: Princeton Architectural Press, November 2006.
- The Phaidon Atlas of 21st Century World Architecture. “U.S.A.-East.” New York: Phaidon Press.
