= Geography of Mississauga =

Overview map of Mississauga, including neighbourhoods, land use patterns, and transport corridors.

Mississauga is a city in the Canadian province of Ontario. It is a suburb of Toronto. The city is situated in the Regional Municipality of Peel and covers 288.42 square kilometres (111.36 sq mi) of land, fronting 13 kilometres (8.1 mi) of shoreline on Lake Ontario.

Mississauga is bounded by Oakville and Milton to the west/southwest, Brampton to the north, Toronto to the east, and Lake Ontario to the south/south-east. Halton Hills borders Mississauga's north-west corner. With the exception of the southeast border with Toronto (Etobicoke Creek), Mississauga shares a land border with all of the previous mentioned municipalities.

Two major river valleys feed into the lake. The Credit River is by far the longest with the heaviest flow. It divides the western side of Mississauga from the central/eastern portions and enters the lake at the Port Credit harbour 600 m (0.37 mi) west of Hurontario Street. The indented, mostly forested valley was inhabited by First Nation peoples long before European exploration of the area. The valley is protected and maintained by the Credit Valley Conservation Authority (CVCA).

Etobicoke Creek forms part of the eastern border of Mississauga with the City of Toronto as far north as Eglinton Avenue. North of there it passes through the western infield area of Toronto Pearson International Airport. There have been two aviation accidents, in 1978 and 2005, where aircraft overshot the runway and slid into the Etobicoke creek banks. In 1954, heavy flooding resulted in some homes along the riverbank being swept into the lake after heavy rains from Hurricane Hazel. Since that storm, houses are no longer constructed along this floodplain. This creek and its tributaries are administered by the Toronto and Region Conservation Authority (TRCA).

Most land in Mississauga drains to either of the two main river systems, with the exception of the smaller Mary Fix and Cooksville creeks which run roughly through the centre of Mississauga, entering the lake east of Hurontario St. Some small streams and reservoirs are part of the Sixteen Mile Creek system in the far northwest corner of the city, but these drain toward the lake in neighbouring Milton and Oakville.

The shoreline of former Glacial Lake Iroquois roughly follows the Dundas Street alignment. It is not noticeable in most places but is very prominent in the vicinity of the Dundas Street and Mavis Road intersection, where the ancient shoreline drops below, affording a clear view of downtown Toronto and Lake Ontario on clear days from the ridge. The land in Mississauga in general slopes gradually downward from almost 190 metres (623 ft) above sea level in some northern spots to Lake Ontario (76 m/249 ft ASL), a 110-metre (361 ft) difference over an averaged 15 kilometres (9 mi) distance.

Apart from the Credit River valley and Iroquois shoreline, the only noticeable hills in Mississauga are actually part of the former Britannia Landfill near Britannia Road and Terry Fox Way.

== Neighbourhoods ==
As defined by the Canadian census, the following areas are neighbourhoods in Mississauga.

- Applewood
- Central Erin Mills
- Churchill Meadows
- City Centre
- Clarkson-Lorne Park
- Cooksville
- Creditview
- Dixie
- East Credit
- Erin Mills
- Erindale
- Fairview
- Hurontario
- Lakeview
- Lisgar
- Malton
- Meadowvale
- Meadowvale Village
- Mineola
- Mississauga Valley
- Port Credit
- Rathwood
- Sheridan
- Streetsville

== Climate ==
The climate of Mississauga is officially represented by Pearson International Airport but conditions can differ depending on location: fog tends to be more common along the lakeshore and in the Credit River Valley at certain times of year, particularly during the autumn. The southwestern side of the city (Clarkson) is usually significantly milder in winter and also on summer nights than northern areas which include the airport, while lakeshore areas particularly from Port Credit east through Lakeview are cooler on hot summer days and it can be noticeably cooler on sunny spring days when there is a lake breeze.

During snowfalls when temperatures hover close to freezing, northern parts of the city, such as around Derry Road away from warmer Lake Ontario, tend to get more snow than the southern parts because of colder temperatures. The reverse occurs when a strong storm approaches from the south kicking up lake effect snow, bringing higher snowfall totals to south Mississauga.

Summer thunderstorms are common, most are not severe but can occasionally bring violent winds. The last known tornado to cause significant damage touched down on July 7, 1985, when an F1 rated tornado struck an industrial park in the Meadowvale area, heavily damaging some buildings and some parked tractor trailers. A relatively strong tornado tore a path across Toronto Township (the precursor municipality to Mississauga) on June 24, 1923, cutting a swath from present-day Meadowvale to near Cooksville, killing four people and causing massive property damage in a time when most of the area was still rural farmland dotted with fruit orchards.

=== Statistics ===
Climate data for Lester B. Pearson International Airport (Brampton and North Mississauga) WMO ID: 71624; coordinates 43°40′38″N 79°37′50″W, elevation: 173.4 m (569 ft), 1991–2020 normals, extremes 1937–present
Month	Jan	Feb	Mar	Apr	May	Jun	Jul	Aug	Sep	Oct	Nov	Dec	Year
Record high humidex	19.0	18.3	29.6	37.9	42.6	45.6	50.3	46.6	48.0	39.1	28.6	23.9	50.3
Record high °C (°F)	17.6 (63.7)	17.7 (63.9)	26.0 (78.8)	31.1 (88.0)	34.4 (93.9)	36.7 (98.1)	37.9 (100.2)	38.3 (100.9)	36.7 (98.1)	31.8 (89.2)	25.1 (77.2)	20.0 (68.0)	38.3 (100.9)
Mean daily maximum °C (°F)	−1.2 (29.8)	−0.3 (31.5)	5.0 (41.0)	12.0 (53.6)	19.2 (66.6)	24.5 (76.1)	27.4 (81.3)	26.3 (79.3)	22.3 (72.1)	14.6 (58.3)	7.9 (46.2)	1.9 (35.4)	13.3 (55.9)
Daily mean °C (°F)	−5 (23)	−4.4 (24.1)	0.6 (33.1)	7.0 (44.6)	13.7 (56.7)	19.2 (66.6)	22.1 (71.8)	21.1 (70.0)	16.9 (62.4)	10.0 (50.0)	4.1 (39.4)	−1.6 (29.1)	8.6 (47.5)
Mean daily minimum °C (°F)	−8.9 (16.0)	−8.5 (16.7)	−3.8 (25.2)	1.9 (35.4)	8.2 (46.8)	13.9 (57.0)	16.6 (61.9)	15.8 (60.4)	11.6 (52.9)	5.3 (41.5)	0.2 (32.4)	−5 (23)	3.9 (39.0)
Record low °C (°F)	−31.3 (−24.3)	−31.1 (−24.0)	−28.9 (−20.0)	−17.2 (1.0)	−5.6 (21.9)	0.6 (33.1)	3.9 (39.0)	1.1 (34.0)	−3.9 (25.0)	−8.3 (17.1)	−18.3 (−0.9)	−31.1 (−24.0)	−31.3 (−24.3)
Record low wind chill	−44.7	−38.9	−36.2	−25.4	−9.5	0.0	0.0	0.0	−8.0	−13.5	−25.4	−38.5	−44.7
Average precipitation mm (inches)	61.6 (2.43)	50.2 (1.98)	50.5 (1.99)	76.7 (3.02)	77.6 (3.06)	80.7 (3.18)	74.0 (2.91)	68.5 (2.70)	69.4 (2.73)	67.2 (2.65)	71.8 (2.83)	58.6 (2.31)	806.8 (31.76)
Average rainfall mm (inches)	33.8 (1.33)	23.9 (0.94)	34.0 (1.34)	70.7 (2.78)	77.5 (3.05)	80.7 (3.18)	74.0 (2.91)	68.5 (2.70)	69.4 (2.73)	67.0 (2.64)	62.7 (2.47)	35.3 (1.39)	697.4 (27.46)
Average snowfall cm (inches)	31.5 (12.4)	27.7 (10.9)	17.2 (6.8)	4.5 (1.8)	0.1 (0.0)	0.0 (0.0)	0.0 (0.0)	0.0 (0.0)	0.0 (0.0)	0.2 (0.1)	9.3 (3.7)	24.1 (9.5)	114.5 (45.1)
Average precipitation days (≥ 0.2 mm)	16.2	12.0	12.3	12.5	12.7	10.8	10.3	9.8	10.2	12.8	12.6	14.9	147.3
Average rainy days (≥ 0.2 mm)	6.2	4.6	7.2	11.7	12.7	10.8	10.3	9.8	10.2	12.8	10.4	7.5	114.1
Average snowy days (≥ 0.2 cm)	12.7	9.7	6.8	2.2	0.12	0.0	0.0	0.0	0.0	0.24	3.6	9.2	44.7
Average relative humidity (%) (at 15:00)	69.7	65.7	58.5	53.4	53.6	54.4	52.9	55.2	57.3	61.6	66.7	70.5	60.0
Mean monthly sunshine hours	79.7	112.2	159.4	204.4	228.2	249.7	294.4	274.5	215.7	163.7	94.2	86.2	2,161.4
Percentage possible sunshine	27.6	38.0	43.2	50.8	50.1	54.1	63.0	63.4	57.4	47.8	32.0	30.9	46.5
Source: Environment and Climate Change Canada

Climate data for Lester B. Pearson International Airport (1971–2000)
Month	Jan	Feb	Mar	Apr	May	Jun	Jul	Aug	Sep	Oct	Nov	Dec	Year
Mean daily maximum °C (°F)	−2.1 (28.2)	−1.1 (30.0)	4.1 (39.4)	11.5 (52.7)	18.8 (65.8)	23.7 (74.7)	26.8 (80.2)	25.6 (78.1)	21.0 (69.8)	13.9 (57.0)	7.0 (44.6)	0.9 (33.6)	12.5 (54.5)
Daily mean °C (°F)	−6.3 (20.7)	−5.4 (22.3)	−0.4 (31.3)	6.3 (43.3)	12.9 (55.2)	17.8 (64.0)	20.8 (69.4)	19.9 (67.8)	15.3 (59.5)	8.9 (48.0)	3.2 (37.8)	−2.9 (26.8)	7.5 (45.5)
Mean daily minimum °C (°F)	−10.5 (13.1)	−9.7 (14.5)	−5 (23)	1.0 (33.8)	6.9 (44.4)	11.9 (53.4)	14.8 (58.6)	14.0 (57.2)	9.6 (49.3)	3.9 (39.0)	−0.7 (30.7)	−6.7 (19.9)	2.5 (36.5)
Average precipitation mm (inches)	52.2 (2.06)	42.6 (1.68)	57.1 (2.25)	68.4 (2.69)	72.5 (2.85)	74.2 (2.92)	74.4 (2.93)	79.6 (3.13)	77.5 (3.05)	64.1 (2.52)	69.3 (2.73)	60.9 (2.40)	792.7 (31.21)
Average rainfall mm (inches)	24.9 (0.98)	22.3 (0.88)	36.7 (1.44)	62.4 (2.46)	72.4 (2.85)	74.2 (2.92)	74.4 (2.93)	79.6 (3.13)	77.5 (3.05)	63.4 (2.50)	62.0 (2.44)	34.7 (1.37)	684.6 (26.95)
Average snowfall cm (inches)	31.1 (12.2)	22.1 (8.7)	19.2 (7.6)	5.7 (2.2)	0.1 (0.0)	0.0 (0.0)	0.0 (0.0)	0.0 (0.0)	0.0 (0.0)	0.5 (0.2)	7.6 (3.0)	29.2 (11.5)	115.4 (45.4)
Average precipitation days (≥ 0.2 mm)	14.9	11.6	13.1	12.1	11.9	11.0	10.1	10.8	10.7	11.5	13.2	14.6	145.5
Average rainy days (≥ 0.2 mm)	5.1	4.6	8.0	10.7	11.9	11.0	10.1	10.8	10.7	11.5	10.6	6.7	111.8
Average snowy days (≥ 0.2 cm)	12.6	9.4	7.1	2.6	0.07	0.0	0.0	0.0	0.0	0.40	4.0	10.3	46.5
Average relative humidity (%)	81.7	81.3	81.2	78.8	80.0	82.6	84.5	88.6	89.5	87.1	84.7	83.7	83.6
Mean monthly sunshine hours	75	114	178	218	244	276	302	264	208	173	94	89	2,235
Source 1: Environment and Climate Change Canada
Source 2: The Weather Network (sun only).

Climate data for Lester B. Pearson International Airport (1961–1990)
Month	Jan	Feb	Mar	Apr	May	Jun	Jul	Aug	Sep	Oct	Nov	Dec	Year
Mean daily maximum °C (°F)	−2.5 (27.5)	−1.6 (29.1)	3.7 (38.7)	11.5 (52.7)	18.4 (65.1)	23.6 (74.5)	26.8 (80.2)	25.5 (77.9)	20.9 (69.6)	14.1 (57.4)	7.2 (45.0)	0.4 (32.7)	12.3 (54.1)
Daily mean °C (°F)	−6.7 (19.9)	−6.1 (21.0)	−0.8 (30.6)	6.0 (42.8)	12.3 (54.1)	17.4 (63.3)	20.5 (68.9)	19.5 (67.1)	15.2 (59.4)	8.9 (48.0)	3.2 (37.8)	−3.5 (25.7)	7.2 (45.0)
Mean daily minimum °C (°F)	−11.1 (12.0)	−10.6 (12.9)	−5.3 (22.5)	0.6 (33.1)	6.1 (43.0)	11.1 (52.0)	14.2 (57.6)	13.4 (56.1)	9.4 (48.9)	3.6 (38.5)	−0.8 (30.6)	−7.4 (18.7)	1.9 (35.4)
Average precipitation mm (inches)	45.6 (1.80)	45.5 (1.79)	56.9 (2.24)	64.0 (2.52)	66.0 (2.60)	68.9 (2.71)	76.6 (3.02)	84.2 (3.31)	74.2 (2.92)	63.0 (2.48)	70.3 (2.77)	65.5 (2.58)	780.8 (30.74)
Average rainfall mm (inches)	18.5 (0.73)	20.8 (0.82)	35.1 (1.38)	56.0 (2.20)	65.8 (2.59)	68.9 (2.71)	76.6 (3.02)	84.2 (3.31)	74.2 (2.92)	62.0 (2.44)	64.3 (2.53)	38.3 (1.51)	664.7 (26.17)
Average snowfall cm (inches)	32.3 (12.7)	25.9 (10.2)	19.9 (7.8)	7.3 (2.9)	0.1 (0.0)	0.0 (0.0)	0.0 (0.0)	0.0 (0.0)	0.0 (0.0)	1.1 (0.4)	6.4 (2.5)	31.1 (12.2)	124.2 (48.9)
Average precipitation days (≥ 0.2 mm)	14	12	13	12	11	11	10	11	10	12	13	15	141
Average rainy days (≥ 0.2 mm)	4	4	8	10	11	11	10	11	10	11	11	7	107
Average snowy days (≥ 0.2 cm)	12	10	7	3	0	0	0	0	0	0	4	11	47
Average relative humidity (%) (at 6:00)	82	82	83	81	81	84	86	90	90	88	86	85	85
Source: Environment and Climate Change Canada

Climate data for Lakeview, south Mississauga (1981–2010, extremes 1963–1994)
Month	Jan	Feb	Mar	Apr	May	Jun	Jul	Aug	Sep	Oct	Nov	Dec	Year
Record high °C (°F)	14.4 (57.9)	14.0 (57.2)	24.0 (75.2)	31.0 (87.8)	33.3 (91.9)	36.0 (96.8)	37.0 (98.6)	36.1 (97.0)	34.0 (93.2)	30.6 (87.1)	22.8 (73.0)	20.0 (68.0)	37.0 (98.6)
Mean daily maximum °C (°F)	−0.1 (31.8)	0.8 (33.4)	4.5 (40.1)	11.1 (52.0)	17.3 (63.1)	22.6 (72.7)	25.7 (78.3)	24.6 (76.3)	20.4 (68.7)	13.8 (56.8)	8.3 (46.9)	3.0 (37.4)	12.7 (54.9)
Daily mean °C (°F)	−4.1 (24.6)	−3.2 (26.2)	0.5 (32.9)	7.0 (44.6)	12.5 (54.5)	17.7 (63.9)	21.1 (70.0)	20.2 (68.4)	16.1 (61.0)	9.6 (49.3)	4.7 (40.5)	−0.8 (30.6)	8.4 (47.1)
Mean daily minimum °C (°F)	−8.2 (17.2)	−7.3 (18.9)	−3.5 (25.7)	2.8 (37.0)	7.7 (45.9)	12.8 (55.0)	16.4 (61.5)	15.7 (60.3)	11.7 (53.1)	5.5 (41.9)	1.1 (34.0)	−4.5 (23.9)	4.2 (39.6)
Record low °C (°F)	−31.7 (−25.1)	−31.0 (−23.8)	−25.0 (−13.0)	−12.8 (9.0)	−7.8 (18.0)	1.0 (33.8)	5.6 (42.1)	−0.6 (30.9)	−3.0 (26.6)	−8.3 (17.1)	−11.5 (11.3)	−25.0 (−13.0)	−31.7 (−25.1)
Average precipitation mm (inches)	42.5 (1.67)	44.0 (1.73)	47.2 (1.86)	63.9 (2.52)	77.1 (3.04)	61.0 (2.40)	74.2 (2.92)	88.4 (3.48)	87.0 (3.43)	68.3 (2.69)	82.9 (3.26)	64.3 (2.53)	800.6 (31.52)
Average rainfall mm (inches)	20.3 (0.80)	22.5 (0.89)	35.1 (1.38)	62.5 (2.46)	77.1 (3.04)	61.0 (2.40)	74.2 (2.92)	88.4 (3.48)	87.0 (3.43)	68.3 (2.69)	80.0 (3.15)	46.8 (1.84)	723.1 (28.47)
Average snowfall cm (inches)	22.4 (8.8)	21.5 (8.5)	12.1 (4.8)	1.3 (0.5)	0.0 (0.0)	0.0 (0.0)	0.0 (0.0)	0.0 (0.0)	0.0 (0.0)	0.03 (0.01)	2.8 (1.1)	17.5 (6.9)	77.5 (30.5)
Average precipitation days (≥ 0.2 mm)	9.2	7.6	9.2	11.1	11.9	9.8	10.4	11.0	10.5	12.1	12.8	10.5	126.2
Average rainy days (≥ 0.2 mm)	4.1	3.6	7.0	10.6	11.9	9.8	10.4	11.0	10.5	12.0	12.2	7.5	110.7
Average snowy days (≥ 0.2 cm)	5.3	4.2	2.7	0.64	0.0	0.0	0.0	0.0	0.0	0.07	0.93	3.6	17.4
Source: Environment and Climate Change Canada

Climate data for Lakeview, south Mississauga (1971–2000)
Month	Jan	Feb	Mar	Apr	May	Jun	Jul	Aug	Sep	Oct	Nov	Dec	Year
Mean daily maximum °C (°F)	−0.6 (30.9)	0.1 (32.2)	4.3 (39.7)	10.7 (51.3)	17.0 (62.6)	22.2 (72.0)	25.5 (77.9)	24.5 (76.1)	20.4 (68.7)	13.6 (56.5)	8.1 (46.6)	2.7 (36.9)	12.4 (54.3)
Daily mean °C (°F)	−4.6 (23.7)	−4.0 (24.8)	0.3 (32.5)	6.5 (43.7)	12.2 (54.0)	17.4 (63.3)	20.7 (69.3)	20.0 (68.0)	16.0 (60.8)	9.5 (49.1)	4.7 (40.5)	−1.0 (30.2)	8.2 (46.8)
Mean daily minimum °C (°F)	−8.5 (16.7)	−8.0 (17.6)	−3.6 (25.5)	2.2 (36.0)	7.5 (45.5)	12.5 (54.5)	15.9 (60.6)	15.5 (59.9)	11.6 (52.9)	5.4 (41.7)	1.2 (34.2)	−4.7 (23.5)	3.9 (39.0)
Average precipitation mm (inches)	44.1 (1.74)	41.0 (1.61)	58.8 (2.31)	66.1 (2.60)	72.5 (2.85)	68.9 (2.71)	68.8 (2.71)	76.0 (2.99)	80.2 (3.16)	65.1 (2.56)	76.4 (3.01)	66.3 (2.61)	784.3 (30.88)
Average rainfall mm (inches)	23.1 (0.91)	23.5 (0.93)	46.3 (1.82)	64.2 (2.53)	72.5 (2.85)	68.9 (2.71)	68.8 (2.71)	76.0 (2.99)	80.2 (3.16)	65.1 (2.56)	73.4 (2.89)	46.7 (1.84)	708.7 (27.90)
Average snowfall cm (inches)	21.0 (8.3)	17.5 (6.9)	12.5 (4.9)	2.0 (0.8)	0.0 (0.0)	0.0 (0.0)	0.0 (0.0)	0.0 (0.0)	0.0 (0.0)	0.0 (0.0)	3.0 (1.2)	19.6 (7.7)	75.6 (29.8)
Average precipitation days (≥ 0.2 mm)	8.7	6.9	9.5	10.1	10.7	9.7	9.7	10.0	9.7	10.9	11.6	10.4	117.9
Average rainy days (≥ 0.2 mm)	4.0	3.6	7.5	9.7	10.7	9.7	9.7	10.0	9.7	10.8	11.0	7.0	103.3
Average snowy days (≥ 0.2 cm)	5.1	3.5	2.6	0.65	0.0	0.0	0.0	0.0	0.0	0.05	0.87	4.1	16.8
Source: Environment and Climate Change Canada

Climate data for Clarkson (southwest Mississauga) 1951–1980
Month	Jan	Feb	Mar	Apr	May	Jun	Jul	Aug	Sep	Oct	Nov	Dec	Year
Record high °C (°F)	15.6 (60.1)	14.4 (57.9)	22.8 (73.0)	30.0 (86.0)	35.0 (95.0)	36.1 (97.0)	36.7 (98.1)	38.9 (102.0)	37.8 (100.0)	29.4 (84.9)	26.1 (79.0)	15.6 (60.1)	38.9 (102.0)
Mean daily maximum °C (°F)	−1.2 (29.8)	−0.2 (31.6)	4.2 (39.6)	11.2 (52.2)	17.9 (64.2)	24.3 (75.7)	27.6 (81.7)	26.4 (79.5)	21.9 (71.4)	14.7 (58.5)	7.8 (46.0)	1.5 (34.7)	13.0 (55.4)
Daily mean °C (°F)	−4.8 (23.4)	−3.8 (25.2)	0.7 (33.3)	7.1 (44.8)	12.9 (55.2)	19.0 (66.2)	22.2 (72.0)	21.3 (70.3)	17.2 (63.0)	10.7 (51.3)	4.7 (40.5)	−1.6 (29.1)	8.8 (47.8)
Mean daily minimum °C (°F)	−8.2 (17.2)	−7.5 (18.5)	−2.8 (27.0)	2.8 (37.0)	7.9 (46.2)	13.7 (56.7)	16.7 (62.1)	16.3 (61.3)	12.3 (54.1)	6.6 (43.9)	1.6 (34.9)	−4.8 (23.4)	4.6 (40.3)
Record low °C (°F)	−23.3 (−9.9)	−23.3 (−9.9)	−21.1 (−6.0)	−10 (14)	−0.6 (30.9)	3.9 (39.0)	8.3 (46.9)	5.0 (41.0)	0.6 (33.1)	−6.7 (19.9)	−14.4 (6.1)	−21.7 (−7.1)	−23.3 (−9.9)
Average precipitation mm (inches)	60.0 (2.36)	57.6 (2.27)	68.6 (2.70)	74.3 (2.93)	61.8 (2.43)	69.8 (2.75)	65.6 (2.58)	81.6 (3.21)	66.5 (2.62)	60.8 (2.39)	67.3 (2.65)	70.7 (2.78)	804.6 (31.68)
Average rainfall mm (inches)	24.9 (0.98)	29.1 (1.15)	49.3 (1.94)	70.1 (2.76)	61.8 (2.43)	69.8 (2.75)	65.6 (2.58)	81.6 (3.21)	66.5 (2.62)	60.7 (2.39)	59.8 (2.35)	41.8 (1.65)	681.0 (26.81)
Average snowfall cm (inches)	36.7 (14.4)	29.0 (11.4)	18.6 (7.3)	3.9 (1.5)	0.0 (0.0)	0.0 (0.0)	0.0 (0.0)	0.0 (0.0)	0.0 (0.0)	0.2 (0.1)	7.6 (3.0)	28.0 (11.0)	124.0 (48.8)
Average precipitation days (≥ 0.2 mm)	10	8	8	8	8	8	7	7	8	7	8	10	97
Average rainy days (≥ 0.2 mm)	3	3	5	8	8	8	7	7	8	7	7	5	76
Average snowy days (≥ 0.2 cm)	6	4	3	0	0	0	0	0	0	0	1	4	18
Source: Environment and Climate Change Canada
