= Matari Coffee =

Michigan-based specialty coffee chain

- Founded: 2021 or 2022
- Headquarters: Romulus, Michigan, United States
- Number of locations: 7+
- Website: https://mataricoffee.com/

Matari Coffee is a chain of cafés serving Yemeni coffee headquartered in Romulus, Michigan. The company sources its beans from Yemen and roasts them in Michigan or its individual locations. The chain adheres to Yemeni coffee culture, including by being open late.

The company operates on a franchise model.

The company was founded in 2021 or 2022 with a location in Canton, Michigan. Sadeq Almatari, the CEO, named the café after his family, though the name also refers to a coffee-growing region in Yemen also known as Bani Matar. In July 2023, the chain expanded into Canada, opening a second location at Erin Mills Centre section of Ridgeway Plaza in Mississauga, Ontario. As of January 2025, the chain had four locations, and by January 2026 it had seven.
