= Churchill Meadows Community Centre =

Community centre and park in Ontario, Canada

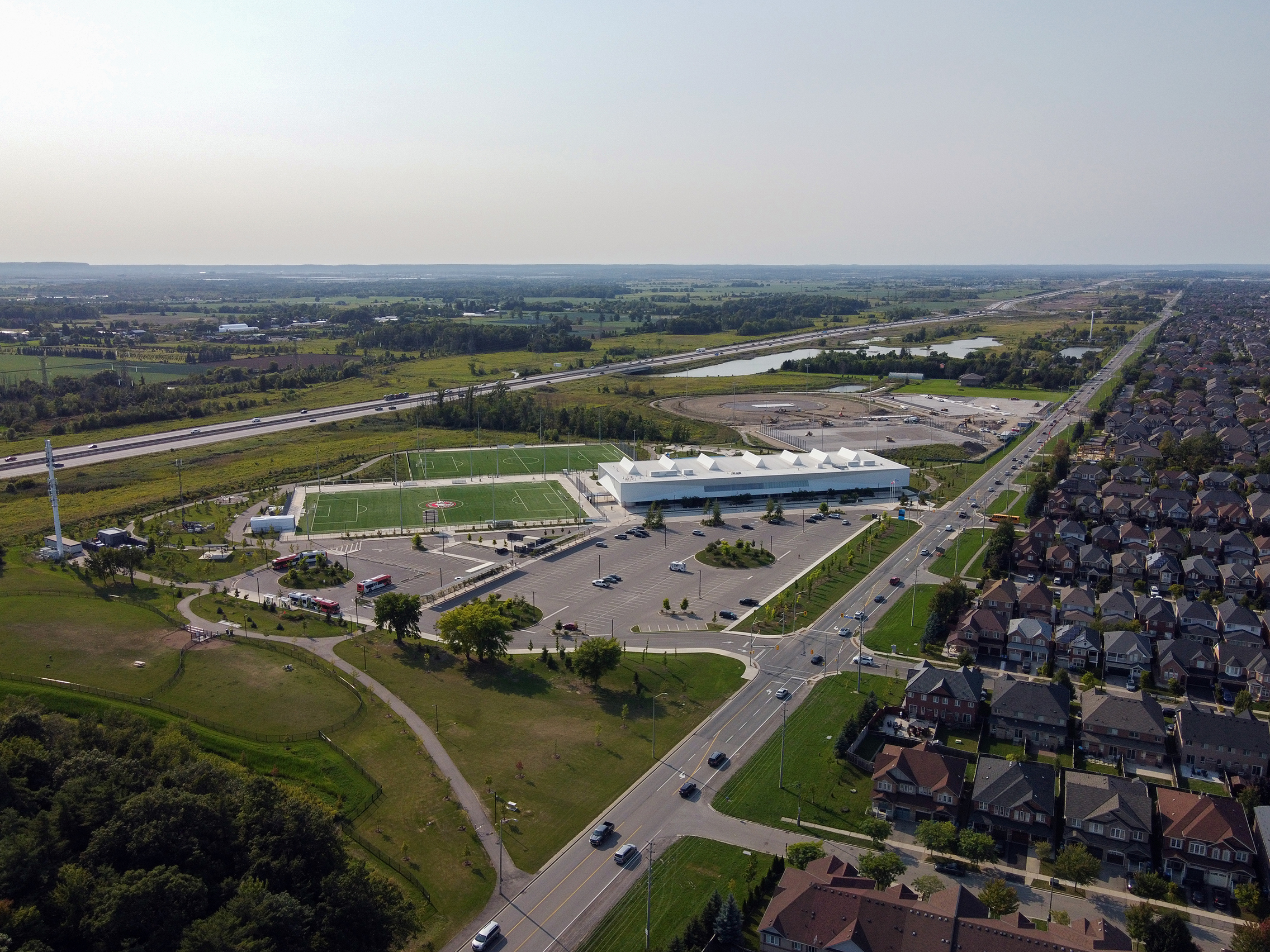
- Aerial view of Churchill Meadows Community Centre and Mattamy Sports Park in 2024
- Interactive map of Churchill Meadows Community Centre
- Type: Community Centre
- Location: Churchill Meadows Mississauga, Ontario, Canada
- Coordinates: 43.540674°N 79.743812°W
- Area: 20.7 hectares (51 acres)
- Opened: September 20, 2021
- Owner: City of Mississauga
- Parking: Yes
- Website: http://www.mississauga.ca/portal/residents/churchillmeadows

Churchill Meadows Community Centre is a community centre and park located in Churchill Meadows, Mississauga, Ontario. It is located on Ninth Line north of Erin Centre Boulevard on the western edge of Mississauga. The site is by relatively flat lands, and contains a protected wooded wetland. It is bordered by Highway 407 on the west, and is expected to connect to the future 407 Transitway once it's complete.

== Construction ==
In mid-2014, the City of Mississauga Ward 10 announced to local residents that they would be building a community park, including a recreational facility, and outdoor recreation as well. They would be building this at the Ninth Line corridor opposite Tacc Drive at its northern point and opposite Burdette Terrace toward the southern part. In late 2014, studies showed that a city-built and operated community centre is the preferred approach for the proposed indoor recreation facility in the city's northwest end. In September 2015, the city approved funding for a pool to be added to the community centre.

The project was designated as Future Community Park 459 set to begin construction in 2017. It was set to cost approximately $51 million (CAD) and would be completed by 2019. After extensive delays, the park opened in September 2021.

== Design ==
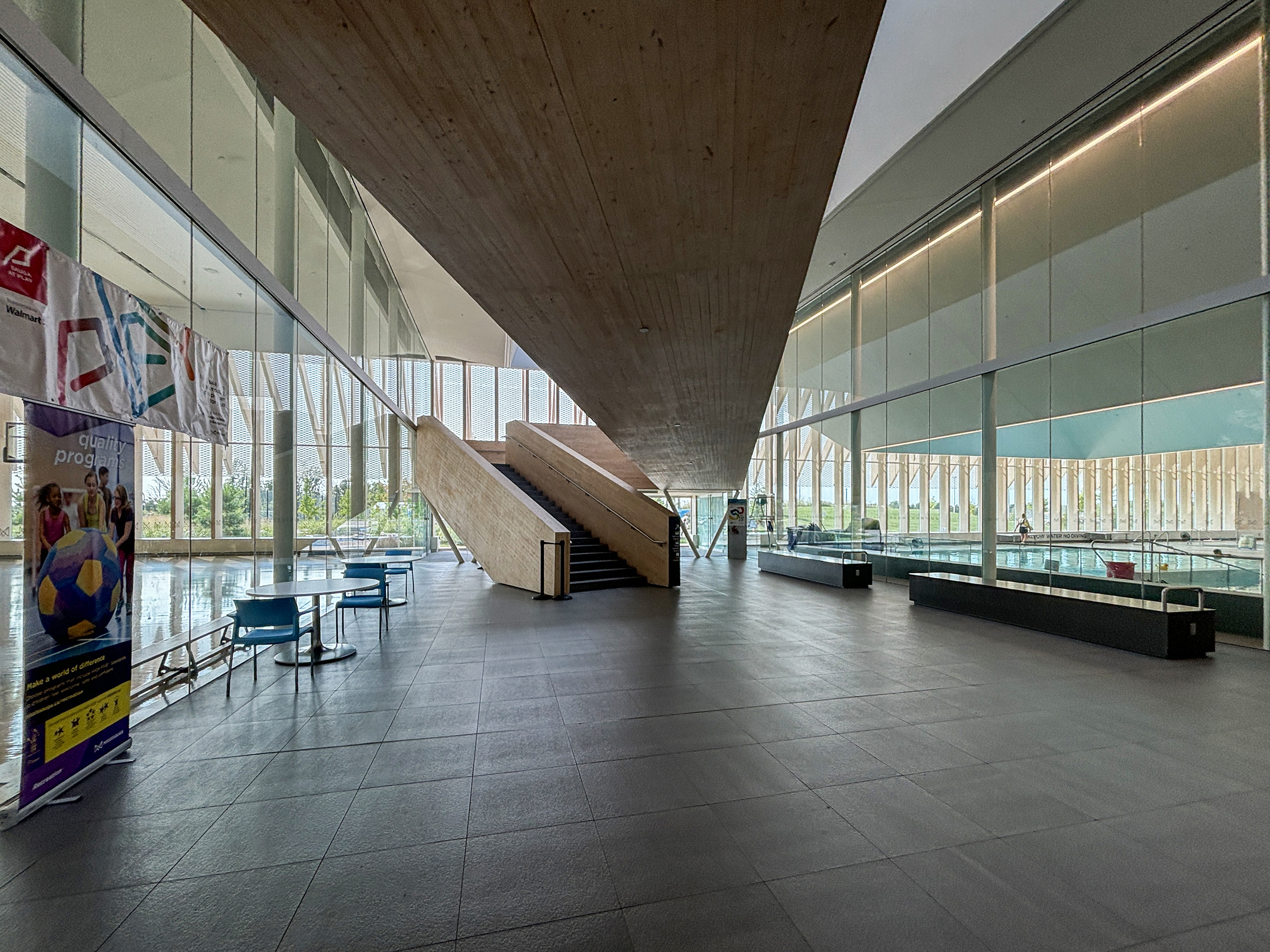
Churchill Meadows Community Centre Lobby

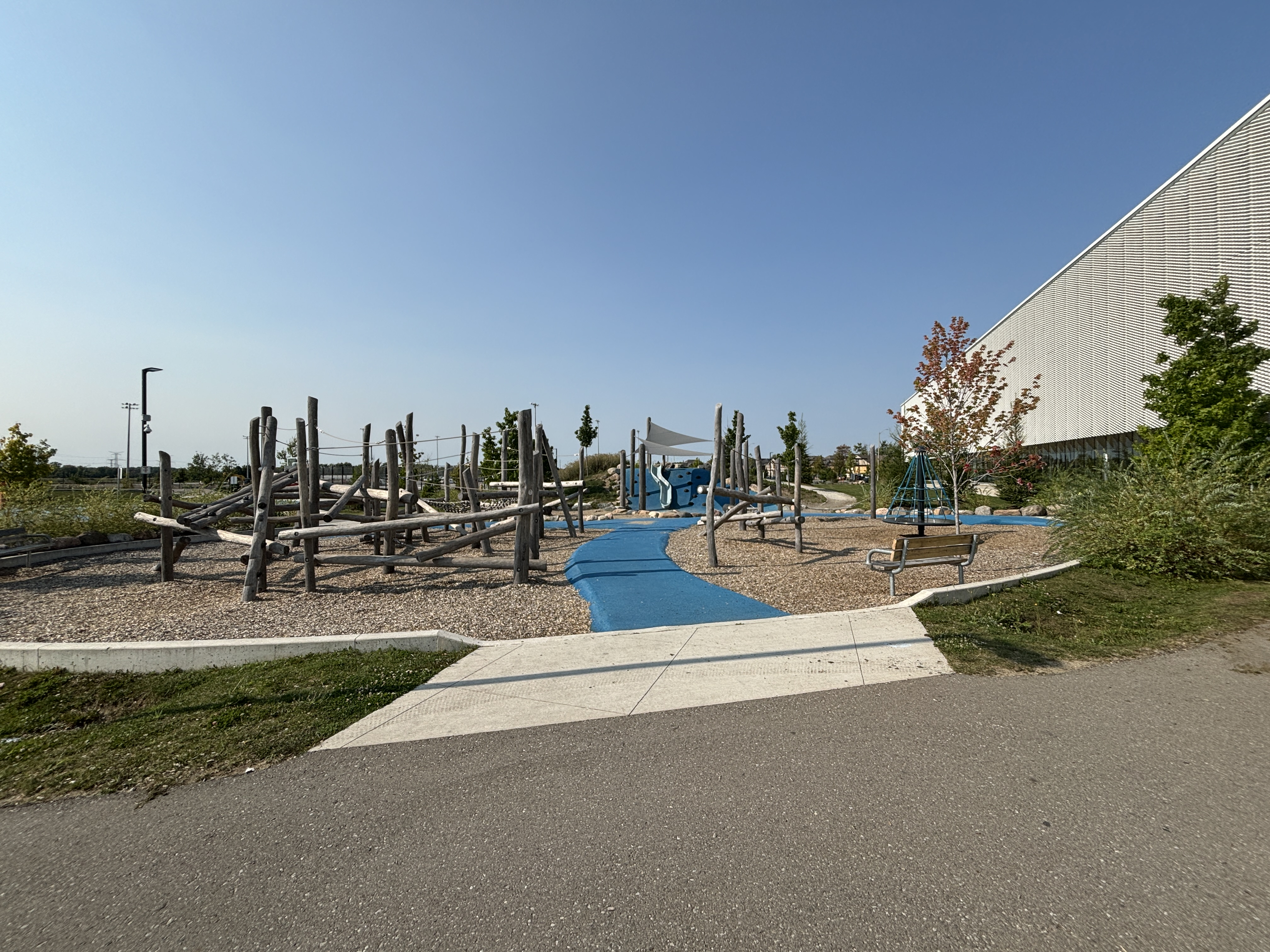
Children Play Area

Ward 10 of Mississauga, Ontario held many public gatherings to discuss the community centre and its design. On December 15, 2016, a concept design photo of the development was released to the public. To date, $360,000 has been spent on the $51 million landmark project. Most of this expenditure is for design of the building, including the 25-metre pool, therapeutic tank and aquatic-related rooms. The centre and area for phase one would include:

- Community centre - with pool, gymnasium and meeting space
- Two lit artificial turf soccer fields, one with a seasonal dome
- Natural area enhancements
- Multipurpose trails, measured loop trail
- Pond and overlook
- Temporary dog leash free zone
- Parks Operations space
- Site servicing, infrastructure and parking

The park is intended to be used by area residents and organized sports groups. It will be designed for all ages and abilities, offering a variety of recreational activities and neighbourhood amenities for year-round use.

The building was designed by Toronto, Ontario-based MacLennan Jaunkalns Miller Architects and constructed by Brampton, Ontario-based Aquicon Construction.

=== Community centre ===
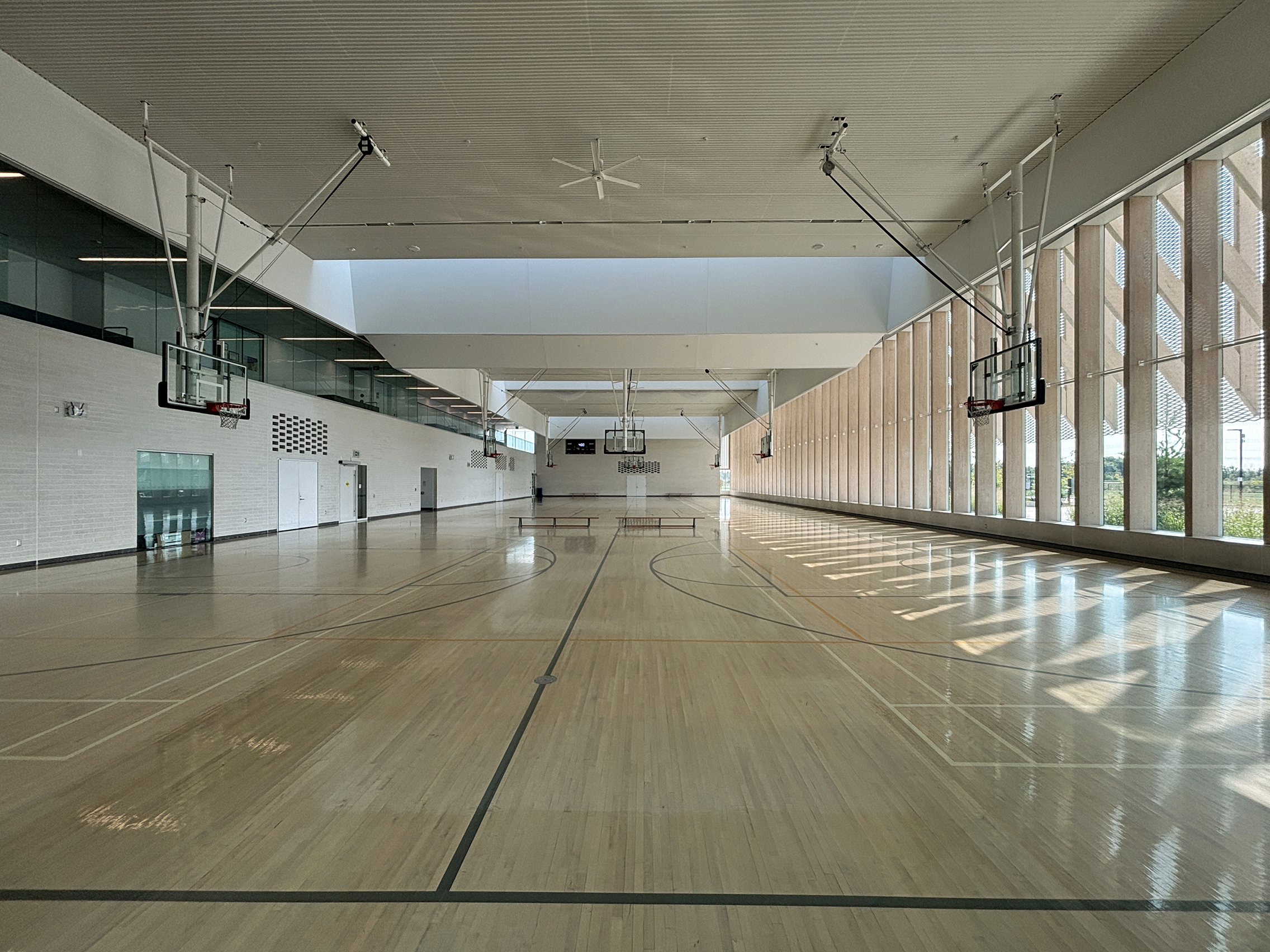
Gymmasium

The community centre is intended to provide multi-use spaces for recreation and community use. Uses for the community centre identified through the public engagement process are being considered, along with the following proposed facilities:

- Gymnasium
- Community social / meeting space
- 25 metre pool and warm water tank

=== Schedule of creation ===
Park 459 will be developed in phases. Construction on Phase One started in the fall of 2018 and finished fall 2021. Future phases to provide additional amenities are dependent on future available funding.

=== Future Phases ===
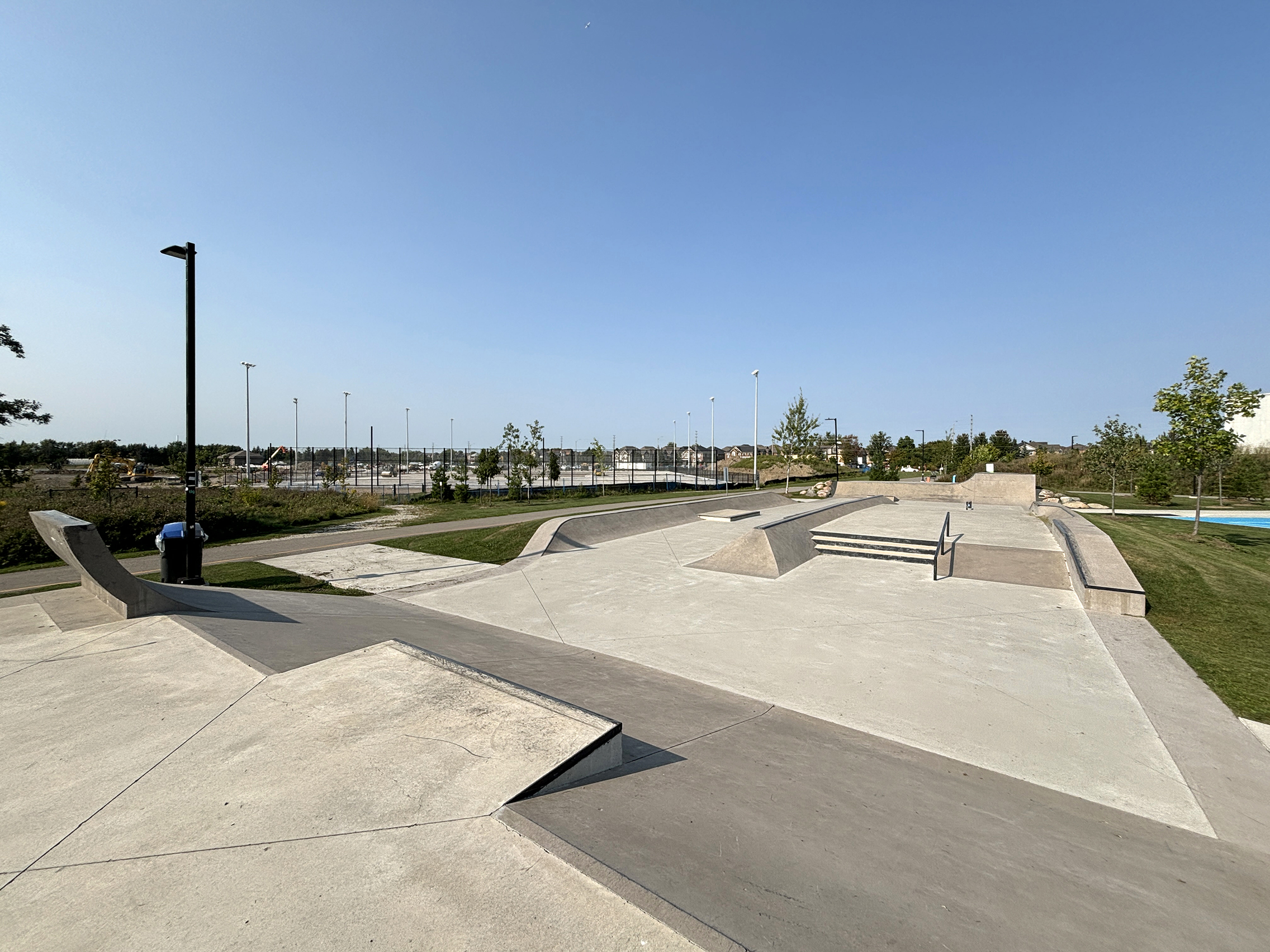
Natural Ice Rink

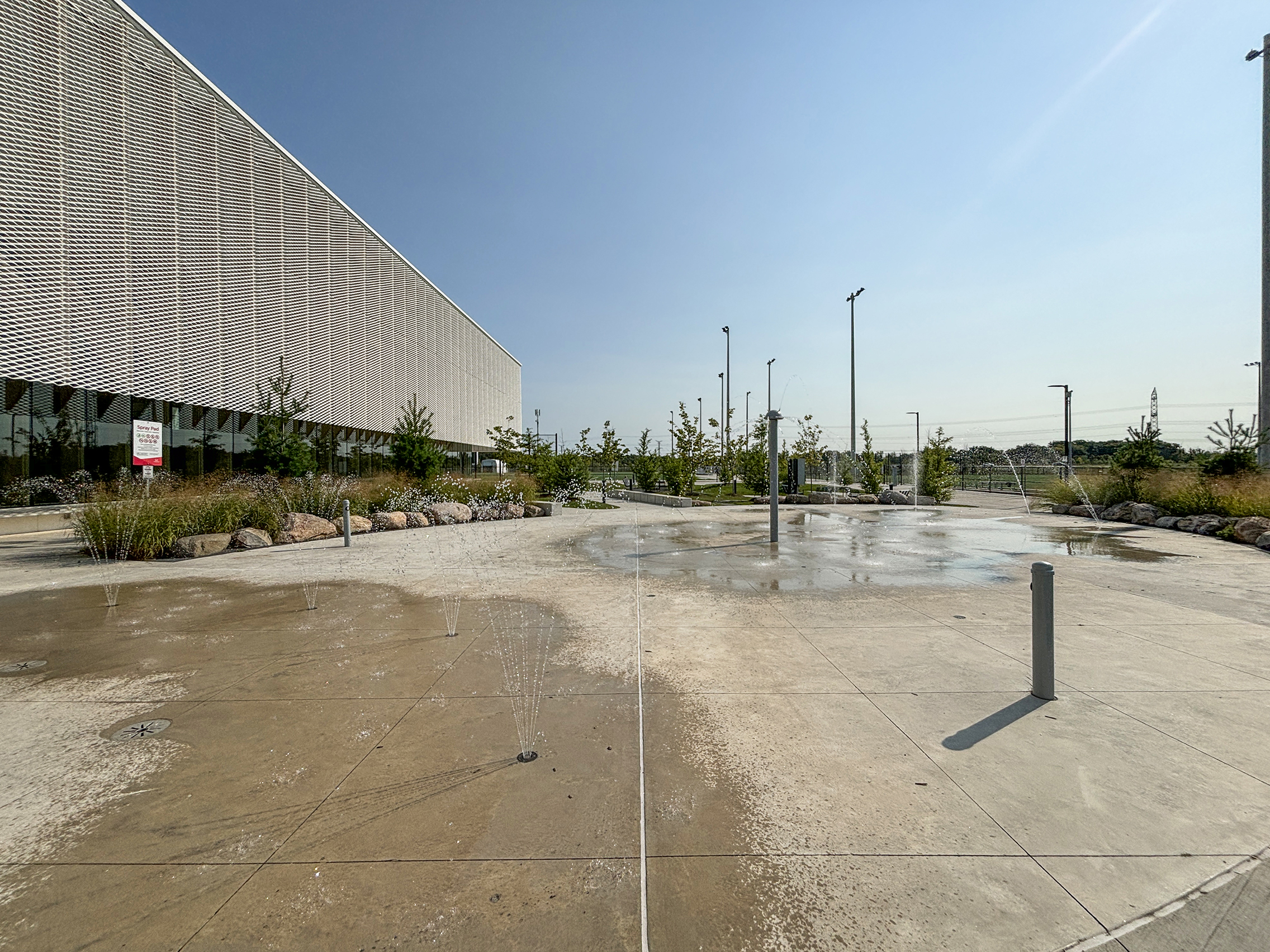
Splash Pad

The design and construction of additional amenities at Park 459 will be determined in the future pending available funding. Uses identified through the public engagement process are being considered, along with the following proposed facilities subject to future available funding. So, the future amenities may include:

- One lit multi-purposed sports field
- One lit cricket pitch
- Playground
- Spray Pad
- Four tennis courts
- One basketball court
- One skate park
- Trails
- Natural areas

== Churchill Meadows Community Centre Terminal ==
Since October 2021, MiWay has operated two routes to service the community centre: 9 Rathburn-Thomas and 35 Eglinton.
