= Churchill Meadows =

- Neighbourhood
- Location of Churchill Meadows in Mississauga Location of Churchill Meadows in Southern Ontario
- Coordinates: 43°33′N 79°44′W
- Country: Canada
- Province: Ontario
- Regional municipality: Peel
- City: Mississauga

Government
  - MP: Iqra Khalid
  - MPP: Sheref Sabawy
  - Councillor: Sue McFadden (Ward 10), Matt Mahoney (Ward 8)

Population (2016)
  - Total: 47,800
- Forward sortation area: L5M

Churchill Meadows is a suburban residential neighbourhood located in the westernmost area of Mississauga, Ontario, Canada. In 2016, Churchill Meadows had a population of 47,800. Postal codes in this area are L5M. The official neighbourhood boundaries for Churchill Meadows are Highway 407 to the west, Britannia Road to the North, Winston Churchill Boulevard to the east and Highway 403 to the south. It is located adjacent to Erin Mills and near the Erin Mills Town Centre. A large community centre, and sports park, Churchill Meadows Community Centre is located in the neighbourhood.

== History ==
The area of present day Churchill Meadows was originally in Trafalgar Township within Halton County. In 1962, Trafalgar Township was divided with the portion containing what is now Churchill Meadows (as well as Lisgar and a small portion of Meadowvale to the north) being amalgamated into Oakville. In 1974, the area became part of Mississauga when the town was given city status and its limits expanded west to Ninth Line (with the remaining area that became part of Oakville 12 years earlier transferred to Milton). An additional annexation of a narrow strip of land west to the then-new Highway 407 was carried out in 2010.

Designed in 1981, the primary plan for Churchill Meadows specified the creation of residential units for the lands north of Eglinton Avenue West and mixed industrial and commercial for the lands located south of Eglinton Avenue West. From 1987 to 1997 secondary plans were created for the newly formed Churchill Meadows Planning district. Finally, in 1997 urban design guidelines outlining the design intent of Churchill Meadows were provided to public and private sector developers. The main principles of the guidelines included a variety of housing types, parks, schools, stormwater management facilities, and a grid pattern of streets within the area. The bulk of the construction and development began in 1997 and ended in 2001, though some infilling is still ongoing. It is one of the newest communities in Mississauga.

== Housing ==
As originally planned by the City of Mississauga the neighbourhood of Churchill Meadows has a wide variety of housing options including fully detached, semi-detached, town houses and condos. Original home owners within Churchill Meadows have seen a great increase in the value of their homes as the average price of homes in Churchill Meadows has increased substantially as of 2017. Homes located in Churchill Meadows are known to sell relatively quickly and for a premium. As one of the newest neighbourhoods in Mississauga, young families have been mostly attracted to the relatively new real estate properties located in Churchill Meadows. As of May 2024 the average price for a fully detached house is $1,497,500. The average price for a semi-detached house is $1,130,000 and the average price for a townhouse is $1,070,000.

== Neighbourhood character ==
The architecture of Churchill Meadows, especially in the southern half of the neighbourhood is quite notable. Almost all of the main streets are lined with medium density town homes, low rise condos and work/live developments. Developers paid particular attention to detail on home exteriors, with classic designs utilizing modern materials. The interior of most homes features modern finishes, layouts and designs.

The residents of Churchill Meadows feature a diverse community. Much of Churchill Meadows is made up of professional families. Due to housing price in the neighbourhood, many homes in the neighbourhood are purchased by middle and upper middle-class buyers.

Churchill Meadows has many small and large parks woven throughout the neighbourhood. Churchill Meadows Community Centre is attached to St. Joan of Arc Catholic Secondary School. The community centre features Churchill Meadows Public Library which it shares with St. Joan of Arc Students during the school year. The community centre also features a dance studio and two gymnasiums that are also utilized by St. Joan of Arc Students during the school year. The Churchill Meadows Community Centre is known to host a variety of family-oriented events throughout the year and is popular among families with young children.

== Demographics ==
Churchill Meadows top six ethnic and cultural groups (by ancestry) in 2021:

- 14% - Pakistani
- 14% - East Indian
- 9% - Chinese
- 6% - Filipino
- 5% - Egyptian
- 4% - Italian

== Education ==
Churchill Meadows is served by a variety of public, private and catholic schools. Public elementary schools include Artesian Drive PS, Oscar Peterson PS, McKinnon PS, and Churchill Meadows PS. Catholic elementary schools include St.Sebastian, St. Faustina, and St.Bernard of Clairvaux. The only private school located in Churchill Meadows is Sherwood Heights Elementary School that opened in 2017. The two public middle schools located in Churchill Meadows include Erin Centre Middle school, and Ruth Thompson Middle school. French immersion is offered at Oscar Peterson PS and Erin Centre Middle School. The sole public high school in Churchill Meadows is Stephen Lewis Secondary School while its catholic counterpart located directly across from it is St. Joan of Arc Catholic Secondary School.

== See also ==
- Churchill Meadows Community Centre
- Erin Mills
- Ridgeway Plaza
