= Applewood, Mississauga =

Applewood
- Suburban district
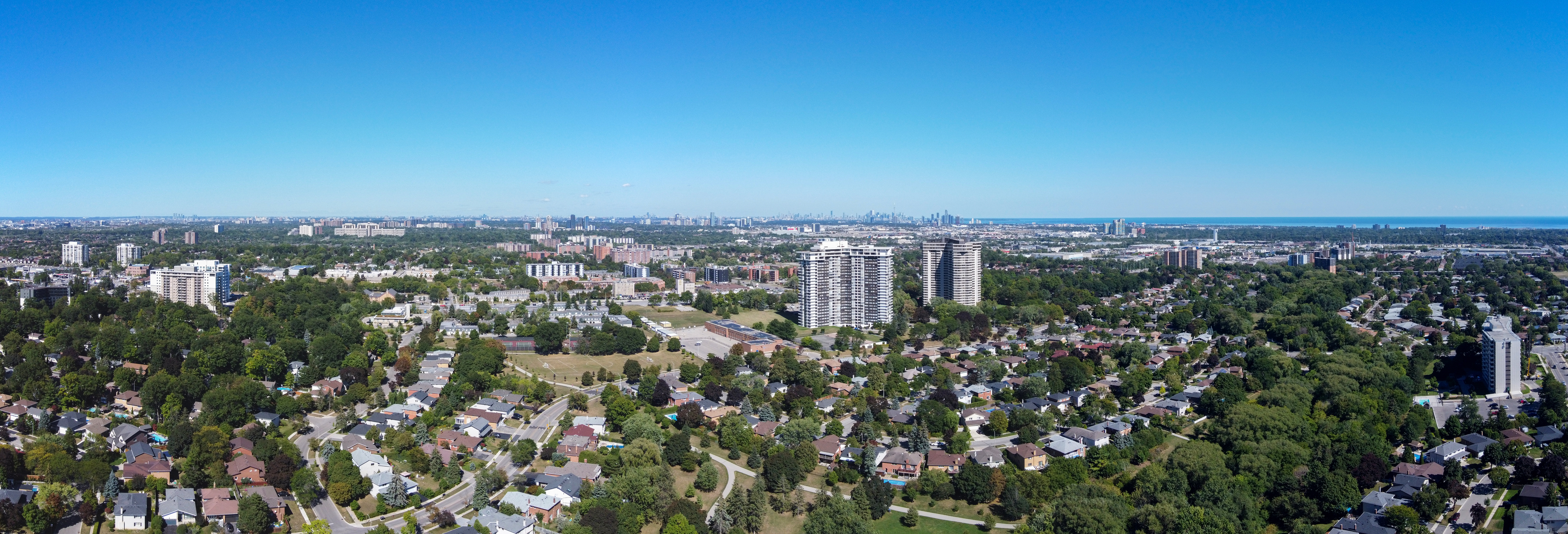
- Aerial view of Applewood

- Location of Applewood in Mississauga Location of Applewood in Southern Ontario
- Coordinates: 43°34′N 79°36′W
- Country: Canada
- Province: Ontario
- Regional Municipality: Peel
- City: Mississauga
- Established: 1955 as subdivision

Government
  - MP: Peter Fonseca (Mississauga East—Cooksville)
  - MPP: Silvia Gualtieri (Mississauga East—Cooksville)
  - Councillors: Chris Fonseca (Ward 3)

Population (2016)
  - Total: 36,000
- Postal code FSA: L5A, L5B

Applewood is a suburban district consisting of a collection of neighbourhoods (each containing the district's name) in the city of Mississauga, Ontario, Canada. It is bordered by Burnhamthorpe Road, Cawthra Road, the Queen Elizabeth Way, and the Etobicoke Creek. It is named for the apple orchards which predominated in the area prior to its development.

== History ==
The earliest settlements in present-day Applewood occurred in the villages of Dixie and Burnhamthorpe which were established during the mid-1800s. The village of Dixie, centred at Dundas Street and Cawthra Road, was built in the early 1800s. The village of Burnhamthorpe was centred around the area of Burnhamthorpe Road and Dixie Road. These villages developed as local service centres for the immediate rural areas, which were characterized by farms and orchards. The cash crop of choice was apples. By the late 1800s, Dixie had an established market gardening centre. The first settlers of Applewood Acres included the Church, Haines, Graham, Stewart and Hedge families. Many Applewood streets are named after these early pioneer families. During the first half of the twentieth century, the villages of Dixie and Burnhamthorpe began to decline as a result of improved access to larger centers such as Port Credit and Cooksville.

The Applewood District area remained predominantly rural to the mid-1950s when G.S. Shipp & Sons Ltd. began to develop the Applewood Heights subdivision on the former T.L. Kennedy farm at the corner of Dundas Street and Tomken Road in 1955. A school, park, church and shopping mall were all constructed in the 1950s to provide service and amenities for the Applewood Acres families. Shipp & Son would build 733 houses in Applewood. Around the same time, the Dixie Industrial Area south of Dundas Street was being promoted for industrial development. Today Applewood is an established residential community, providing a variety of housing types including single and semidetached dwellings, townhouses, apartments and mobile homes. The Applewood district consists of the Applewood Acres community south of Queensway and Applewood Heights and Applewood Hills north of Dundas Street. These communities are separated by an industrial park.

== Demographics ==
According to the Canada 2016 Census (Note: The figures were calculated using Applewood NHD.)

54% of population is immigrants. South Asians and Black make up the largest Visible Minority Groups.
