= List of postal codes of Canada: L =

Postal districts in Ontario: K / L / M / N / P

This is a list of postal codes in Canada where the first letter is L. Postal codes beginning with L are located within the Canadian province of Ontario. Only the first three characters are listed, corresponding to the Forward Sortation Area (FSA).

Canada Post provides a free postal code look-up tool on its website, via its smartphone applications for iPhone and Android, and sells hard-copy directories and CD-ROMs. Many vendors also sell validation tools, which allow customers to properly match addresses and postal codes. Hard-copy directories can also be consulted in all post offices, and some libraries.

== Central Ontario ==
There are currently 168 FSAs in this list.

=== Urban ===
L1A; Port Hope	L2A; Fort Erie	L3A; Not assigned	L4A; Stouffville	L5A; Mississauga (Mississauga Valley / East Cooksville)	L6A; Vaughan (Maple)	L7A; Brampton (West)	L8A; Not assigned	L9A; Hamilton (Crerar / Bruleville / Hill Park / Inch Park / Centremount / Balfour / Greeningdon / Jerome)
L1B; Bowmanville (East)	L2B; Not assigned	L3B; Welland (East)	L4B; Richmond Hill (Southeast)	L5B; Mississauga (West Cooksville / Fairview / City Centre / East Creditview)	L6B; Markham (Cornell / Box Grove )	L7B; King City	L8B; Hamilton (Waterdown)	L9B; Hamilton (Barnstown / West Chappel / Allison / Ryckmans / Mewburn / Sheldon / Falkirk / Carpenter / Kennedy / Southwest Outskirts)
L1C; Bowmanville (West)	L2C; Not assigned	L3C; Welland (West)	L4C; Richmond Hill (Southwest)	L5C; Mississauga (West Creditview / Mavis / Erindale)	L6C; Markham (Berczy Village / Cachet / Angus Glen)	L7C; Caledon (Caledon East / Mayfield West)	L8C; Not assigned	L9C; Hamilton (Southam / Bonnington / Yeoville / Kernighan / Gourley / Rolston / Buchanan / Mohawk / Westcliffe / Gilbert / Gilkson / Gurnett / Fessenden / Mountview)
L1E; Courtice (Bowmanville)	L2E; Niagara Falls (Central)	L3E; Fonthill	L4E; Richmond Hill (Oak Ridges / Lake Wilcox / Temperanceville)	L5E; Mississauga (Central Lakeview)	L6E; Markham (Wismer Commons / Greensborough)	L7E; Bolton	L8E; Hamilton (Confederation Park / Nashdale / East Kentley / Riverdale / Lakely / Grayside / North Stoney Creek)	L9E; Milton (South)
L1G; Oshawa (Central)	L2G; Niagara Falls (Southeast)	L3G; Not assigned	L4G; Aurora	L5G; Mississauga (SW Lakeview / Mineola / East Port Credit)	L6G; Markham (Downtown Markham / Markham Centre)	L7G; Georgetown	L8G; Hamilton (Greenford / North Gershome / West Stoney Creek)	L9G; Hamilton (Ancaster West)
L1H; Oshawa (Southeast)	L2H; Niagara Falls (West)	L3H; Not assigned	L4H; Woodbridge (Kleinburg)	L5H; Mississauga (West Port Credit / Lorne Park / East Sheridan)	L6H; Oakville (North)	L7H; Not assigned	L8H; Hamilton (West Kentley / McQuesten / Parkview / Hamilton Beach / East Industrial Sector / Normanhurst / Homeside / East Crown Point)	L9H; Hamilton (Dundas)
L1J; Oshawa (Southwest)	L2J; Niagara Falls (North)	L3J; Beamsville	L4J; Thornhill (West)	L5J; Mississauga (Clarkson / Southdown)	L6J; Oakville (Northeast)	L7J; Acton	L8J; Hamilton (East Albion Falls / South Stoney Creek)	L9J; Barrie (South)
L1K; Oshawa (East)	L2K; Not assigned	L3K; Port Colborne	L4K; Concord	L5K; Mississauga (West Sheridan)	L6K; Oakville (East)	L7K; Caledon (Caledon Village)	L8K; Hamilton (East Delta / Bartonville / Glenview / Rosedale / Lower King's Forest / Red Hill / Corman / Vincent / South Gershome)	L9K; Hamilton (Ancaster East)
L1L; Oshawa (North)	L2L; Not assigned	L3L; Woodbridge	L4L; Woodbridge (South)	L5L; Mississauga (Erin Mills / Western Business Park)	L6L; Oakville (South)	L7L; Burlington (Corporate, Elizabeth Gardens / Longmoor / Orchard / Pinedale / Shoreacres)	L8L; Hamilton (West Industrial Sector / West Crown Point / North Stipley / North Gibson / Landsdale / Keith / North End / Beasley)	L9L; Port Perry
L1M; Whitby (North)	L2M; St. Catharines (East North End / Port Weller / Facer)	L3M; Grimsby	L4M; Barrie (North/East)	L5M; Mississauga (Churchill Meadows / Central Erin Mills / South Streetsville)	L6M; Oakville (West)	L7M; Burlington (Alton Village / Headon Forest / Millcroft / Palmer / Tansley Woods)	L8M; Hamilton (West Delta / Blakeley / South Stipley / South Gibson / St. Clair)	L9M; Penetanguishene
L1N; Whitby (Southeast)	L2N; St. Catharines (West North End / Port Dalhousie / St. George's Point / Michigan Beach) / Lancaster / North Martindale)	L3N; Not assigned	L4N; Barrie (South/West)	L5N; Mississauga (Lisgar / Meadowvale)	L6N; Not assigned	L7N; Burlington (Dynes, Roseland)	L8N; Hamilton (Stinson / Corktown)	L9N; East Gwillimbury (Holland Landing / River Drive Park)
L1P; Whitby (Southwest)	L2P; St. Catharines (East Queenston / Kernahan / Lock 3, Oakdale / Secord Woods / East Merritton)	L3P; Markham (Central)	L4P; Keswick	L5P; Mississauga (YYZ)	L6P; Brampton (North)	L7P; Burlington (Brant Hills / Tyandaga / Mountainside)	L8P; Hamilton (Durand / Kirkendall / Chedoke Park)	L9P; Uxbridge
L1R; Whitby (Central)	L2R; St. Catharines (Downtown / West Queenston / Fitzgerald / Orchard Park / Haig / North Glenridge)	L3R; Markham (Outer Southwest)	L4R; Midland	L5R; Mississauga (West Hurontario / SW Gateway)	L6R; Brampton (Northwest)	L7R; Burlington (Downtown / Plains)	L8R; Hamilton (Central / Strathcona / South Dundurn)	L9R; Alliston
L1S; Ajax (Southwest)	L2S; St. Catharines (Southeast Martindale / Vansickle / West Power Glen / Western Hill)	L3S; Markham (Armadale, Ontario / Milliken, Ontario)	L4S; Richmond Hill (Central)	L5S; Mississauga (Cardiff / NE Gateway)	L6S; Brampton (North Central)	L7S; Burlington (Maple)	L8S; Hamilton (Westdale / Cootes Paradise / Ainslie Wood / McMaster University)	L9S; Innisfil
L1T; Ajax (Northwest)	L2T; St. Catharines (South Glenridge / East Power Glen / Riverview / Marsdale / Brockview / Barbican Heights / Burleigh Hill / West Merritton)	L3T; Thornhill (East)	L4T; Mississauga (Malton)	L5T; Mississauga (Courtney Park / East Gateway)	L6T; Brampton (East)	L7T; Burlington (Aldershot Central / Aldershot South)	L8T; Hamilton (Sherwood / Huntington / Upper King's Forest / Lisgar / Berrisfield / Hampton Heights / Sunninghill)	L9T; Milton (North)
L1V; Pickering (Southwest)	L2V; Thorold	L3V; Orillia	L4V; Mississauga (Wildwood)	L5V; Mississauga (East Credit)	L6V; Brampton (Central)	L7V; Not assigned	L8V; Hamilton (Raleigh / Macassa / Lawfield / Thorner / Burkholme / Eastmount)	L9V; Orangeville (Shelburne)
L1W; Pickering (South)	L2W; St. Catharines (Southwest Martindale)	L3W; Angus	L4W; Mississauga (Matheson / East Rathwood)	L5W; Mississauga (Meadowvale Village / West Gateway)	L6W; Brampton (Southeast)	L7W; Not assigned	L8W; Hamilton (West Albion Falls / Hannon / Rymal / Trenholme / Quinndale / Templemead / Broughton / Eleanor / Randall / Rushdale / Butler / East Chappel)	L9W; Orangeville (South)
L1X; Pickering (Central)	L2X; Not assigned	L3X; Newmarket (Southwest)	L4X; Mississauga (East Applewood / East Dixie / NE Lakeview)	L5X; Not assigned	L6X; Brampton (Southwest)	L7X; Not assigned	L8X; Not assigned	L9X; Springwater; Barrie; Midhurst; Minesing
L1Y; Pickering (North)	L2Y; Not assigned	L3Y; Newmarket (Northeast)	L4Y; Mississauga (West Applewood / West Dixie / NW Lakeview)	L5Y; Not assigned	L6Y; Brampton (South)	L7Y; Not assigned	L8Y; Not assigned	L9Y; Collingwood
L1Z; Ajax (East)	L2Z; Not assigned	L3Z; Bradford	L4Z; Mississauga (West Rathwood / East Hurontario / SE Gateway / Sandalwood)	L5Z; Not assigned	L6Z; Brampton (West Central)	L7Z; Not assigned	L8Z; Not assigned	L9Z; Wasaga Beach

=== Rural (* = retired) ===
L0A
West Northumberland County / South Kawartha Lakes

1A0: Bethany
1B0: Campbellcroft
1C0: Cavan
1E0: Kendal
1G0: Millbrook
1H0: Newcastle*
1J0: Newtonville
1K0: Pontypool

L0B
East Durham Region

1A0: Ashburn
1B0: Blackstock
1C0: Brooklin*
1E0: Caesarea
1J0: Hampton
1K0: Janetville
1L0: Nestleton Station
1M0: Orono
1N0: Port Perry*
1P0: Prince Albert*

L0C
West Durham Region

1A0: Goodwood
1B0: Greenbank
1C0: Leaskdale
1E0: Sandford
1G0: Seagrave
1H0: Sunderland
1K0: Uxbridge*
1L0: Udora

L0E
Lake Simcoe Southeast Shore

1A0: Baldwin
1E0: Cannington
1L0: Jackson's Point
1M0: Keswick*
1N0: Pefferlaw
1P0: Roches Point*
1R0: Sutton West
1S0: Willow Beach
1T0: Zephyr

L0G
Ontario Centre

1A0: Beeton
1B0: Bond Head
1C0: Bradford*
1E0: Cedar Valley
1H0: Holland Landing*
1J0: Kettleby*
1K0: King City*
1L0: Loretto
1M0: Mount Albert
1N0: Nobleton
1P0: Oak Ridges*
1R0: Queensville
1S0: River Drive Park*
1T0: Schomberg
1V0: Sharon
1W0: Tottenham
1X0: Lake Wilcox*
1Y0: Holland Landing*

L0H
York/Durham Boundary South

1A0: Brougham
1C0: Pickering (Cherrywood)*
1E0: Pickering (Claremont)*
1G0: Gormley
1H0: Greenwood
1J0: Locust Hill
1K0: Markham (Milliken)*
1L0: Stouffville*
1M0: Whitevale

L0J
Peel/York Boundary South

0A1: Kleinburg
1A0: Black Creek Village*
1B0: Huttonville*
1C0: Kleinburg
1E0: Maple*
1K0: Meadowvale*

L0K
Lake Simcoe North Shore

1A0: Beaverton
1B0: Brechin
1C0: Cedar Point*
1E0: Coldwater
1G0: Cumberland Beach
1J0: Grandview Beach*
1L0: Longford Mills
1N0: Moonstone
1P0: Penetanguishene*
1R0: Port McNicoll
1S0: Port Severn
1T0: Rama*
1V0: Sawlog Bay*
1W0: Sebright
1Y0: Thunder Beach*
2A0: Victoria Harbour
2B0: Washago
2C0: Waubaushene
2E0: Wyebridge
2G0: Warminster
2H0: Penetanguishene Sub*
2J0: Penetanguishene Sub*

L0L
Lake Simcoe West Shore

1C0: Belle Ewart*
1K0: Churchill
1L0: Cookstown
1N0: Egbert
1P0: Elmvale
1R0: Gilford
1T0: Oro-Medonte (Hawkestone)
1V0: Hillsdale
1W0: Lefroy
1X0: Midhurst
1Y0: Minesing
2E0: Oro Station
2J0: Tiny
2K0: Phelpston
2L0: Shanty Bay
2M0: Stroud*
2N0: Thornton
2P0: Wasaga Beach*
2T0: Tiny
2X0: Oro

L0M
Georgian Bay South Shore

1A0: Alliston*
1B0: Angus
1C0: Borden
1E0: Wasaga Beach (Brock's Beach)*
1G0: Creemore
1H0: Duntroon
1J0: Everett
1K0: Glencairn
1L0: Glen Huron
1M0: Lisle
1N0: New Lowell
1P0: Nottawa
1S0: Stayner
1T0: Utopia

L0N
Peel/Dufferin Boundary West

1A0: Alton
1B0: Belfountain*
1C0: Caledon Village*
1E0: Caledon East
1G0: Grand Valley*
1H0: Honeywood*
1J0: Horning's Mills*
1K0: Inglewood*
1L0: Laurel*
1M0: Mansfield
1N0: Orton
1P0: Palgrave
1R0: Rosemont
1S0: Shelburne*

L0P
Halton Region / Halton/Peel Boundary North

1A0: Bolton*
1B0: Campbellville
1C0: Cheltenham*
1E0: Hornby
1G0: Kilbride*
1H0: Limehouse
1J0: Moffat
1K0: Norval
1M0: Brampton (Snelgrove)*
1N0: Terra Cotta
1R0: Acton*

L0R
East Haldimand County / Northwest Niagara Region / Most of rural Hamilton

0A0: Binbrook
1A0: Alberton
1B0: Beamsville
1C0: Binbrook
1E0: Caistor Centre
1G0: Campden
1H0: Carlisle
1J0: Copetown
1K0: Freelton
1L0: Hamilton (Fruitland)*
1M0: Grassie
1P0: Hannon
1R0: Jerseyville
1S0: Jordan Station
1T0: Lynden
1V0: Millgrove
1W0: Mount Hope
1X0: Rockton
1Y0: St. Ann's
1Z0: Sheffield
2A0: Smithville
2B0: Troy
2C0: Vineland
2E0: Vineland Station
2G0: Vinemount*
2H0: Waterdown
2J0: Wellandport
2K0: West Flamborough*
2L0: Winona*
2M0: Waterdown
2N0: Beamsville*
3B0: Beamsville

L0S
South and Northeast Niagara Region

1A0: Allanburg
1B0: Crystal Beach
1C0: Fenwick
1E0: Fonthill
1J0: Niagara on the Lake
1K0: Port Robinson
1L0: Queenston
1M0: Ridgeville
1N0: Ridgeway
1P0: St. David's
1R0: Sherkston
1S0: Stevensville
1T0: Virgil
1V0: Wainfleet

L0T
Not in use
L0V
Not in use
L0W
Not in use
L0X
Not in use
L0Y
Not in use
L0Z
Not in use

== Most populated FSAs ==
1. L9T, 110,956
2. L5M, 106,468
3. L7A, 104,009
4. L4N, 100,835
5. L6Y, 97,601

== Least populated FSAs ==
1. L4V, 5
2. L5T, 19
3. L5S, 27
4. L3L, 879
5. L0H, 1,223
