= Erindale, Mississauga =

Erindale
- Neighbourhood
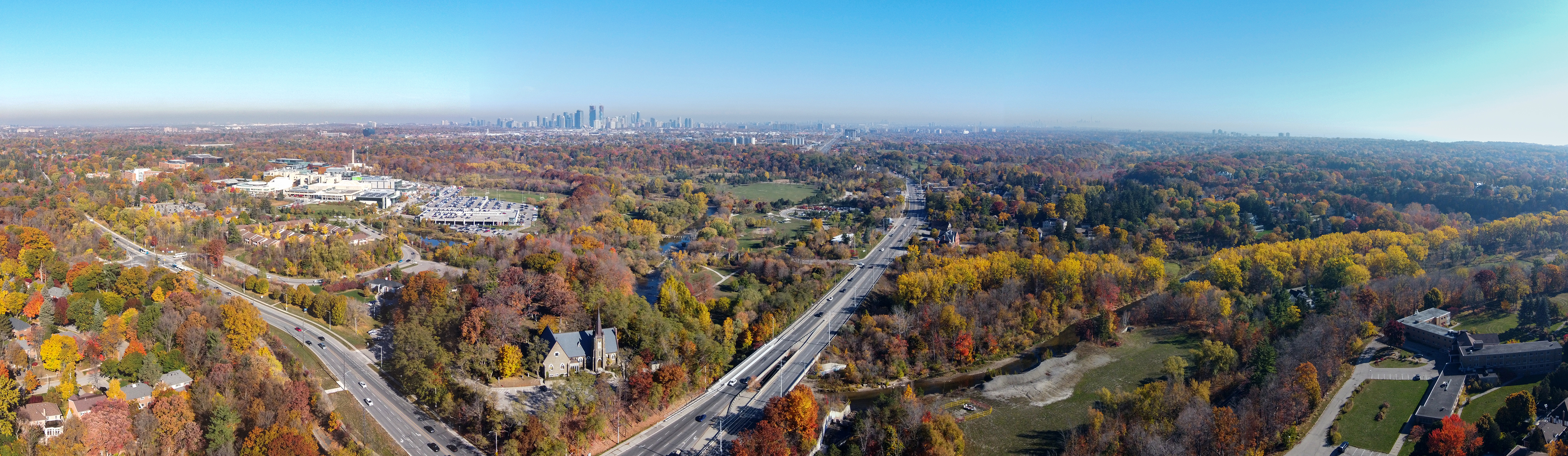
- Aerial view of Erindale, Mississauga in 2022

- Location within Regional Municipality of Peel Location within Southern Ontario
- Coordinates: 43°32′40″N 79°39′5″W
- Country: Canada
- Province: Ontario
- Regional municipality: Peel
- City: Mississauga
- Established: 1805
- Time zone: UTC-5 (EST)
  - Summer (DST): UTC-4 (EDT)
- Forward sortation area: L5C
- Area codes: 905 and 289
- NTS Map: 030M12
- GNBC Code: FBCVH

Erindale is a historical neighbourhood located within the central part of the city of Mississauga, west of Toronto, Ontario, Canada. Erindale is named in honour of the birthplace of the first rector of the village, Reverend James Magrath from Erin (Ireland).

It runs along Dundas Street West. The centre of the old village is just to the east of the Credit River valley. A large campus of the University of Toronto, known as the University of Toronto Mississauga and formerly Erindale College, is located on the west bank of the river.

== Rivière du Credit ==
During the 17th and 18th centuries, French trappers named the river on which Erindale sits as "Rivière du Credit". Aboriginal peoples called it the "trusting river" because the guns, knives and kettles they obtained in exchange for their furs and woven baskets were often bought on credit.

As settlement progressed, the Mississauga Indians sold their land. In the treaty of 1805 signed by Chief Quenippenon the tribe ceded 70,784 acres (286.45 km^{2}). A second sale of 648,000 acres (2,620 km^{2}) followed in 1818.

== Settlers ==
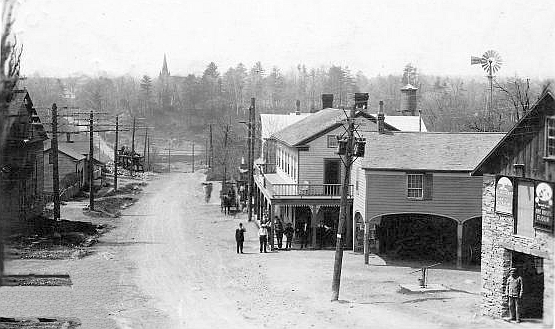
Dundas Street in Erindale (circa 1910)

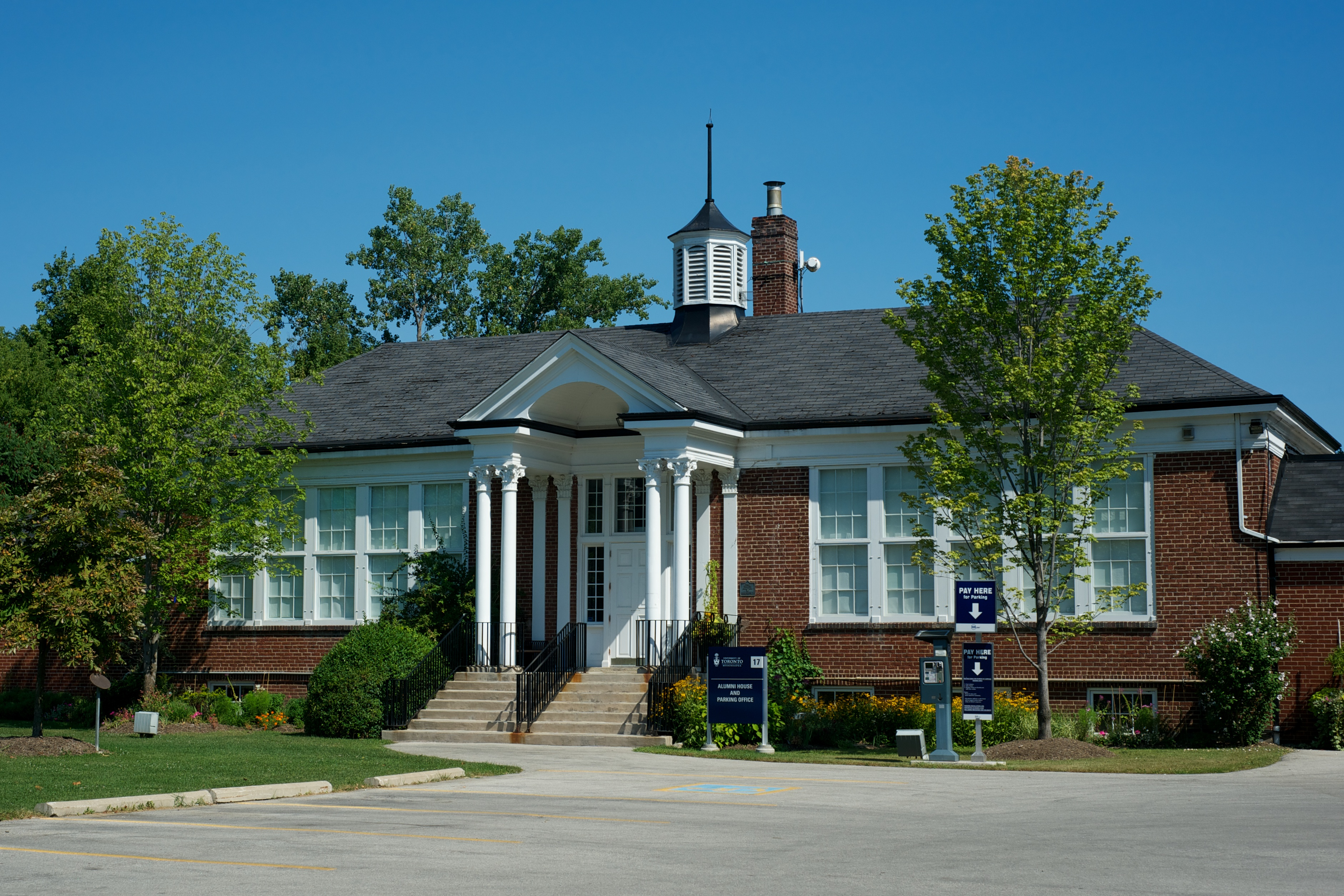
Old Erindale Public School

The "Indian Trail" became a military road and was named Dundas Street after the British Secretary-at-War, Henry Dundas. The Credit Village developed along Dundas Street, settled mainly by people from the bustling Town of York (now Toronto). By 1809 there were 185 settlers in the area. Sawmills and grist mills were built, powered by water diverted from the river. Most of these settlers were United Empire Loyalists from the former Thirteen Colonies to the south or from settlements in Atlantic Canada, especially New Brunswick.

By 1830 the Crown was selling the land in 100- to 200-acre (0.40–0.81 km^{2}) lots and streets were named after prominent people who settled there. Old Country immigrants began arriving, mingling with the United Empire Loyalists and New Brunswickers. There was also a large group of Irish immigrants who arrived from New York City.

== Name ==
The Credit Village became Springbrook, then Springfield and finally Erindale. Plank roads were laid over the mud of spring and fall and Erindale became a main stopping place for stagecoaches travelling between Toronto and Hamilton.

== Points of interest ==
=== Erindale Park ===
The ruins of an old hydro electric dam are situated just north of Dundas and a park is located by the river. Constructed from 1902 to 1910, Erindale Light and Power Company power dam flooded the area located near the entrance of Erindale Park at Dundas Street creating a man made 125 acres Lake Erindale. The power station operated from 1916 to 1923, but suffered for a setback after concrete cracked. Streetsville Public Utility Commission replaced the power company. The dam was made redundant by the opening of the power station in Niagara Falls, Ontario in 1922 but continued to supply power to the local area. The power station dam was drained in 1941, with the dam was blown up and area used as landfill dump from 1961 to 1965. The last reminder of the power station, power house, was demolished in 1977 as the current park was being developed.

=== Sheridan Centre ===
Built in 1969, the 70 stores Sheridan Centre on Erin Mills Parkway, was the area's major mall for two decades until Erin Mills Town Centre opened further north in neighbouring Erin Mills. It is now being redeveloped as mixed residential and retail area called Sherwood Village but will retain the mall as is.

== See also ==
- Erindale GO Station
