= Ridgeway Plaza =

Shopping centre in Mississauga

- Location: Eglinton Avenue and Ridgeway Drive, Mississauga, Ontario, Canada
- Coordinates: 43.5375°N 79.7275°W
- Opened: Spring 2022
- Developer: GTA Development Corp
- Num. of stores: 115+
- Website: Ridgeway Plaza

Ridgeway Plaza is a shopping centre in the Churchill Meadows neighbourhood of Mississauga, Ontario, Canada. Located at the intersection of Eglinton Avenue and Ridgeway Drive, it consists of Erin Mills Centre to the north and Platinum Centre to the south. Opened in 2022, the plaza contains 277 units. It is most known for its restaurants offering a variety of regional cuisines though non-restaurant businesses also operate. It quickly became a major halal food destination and late-night gathering spot, attracting visitors from across North America. Over 100 traffic and nuisance complaints have involved the plaza since it opened, leading Mississauga to restrict gatherings there via court injunction in 2025. The City capped the plaza's restaurant area in 2024, and in 2026 passed a by-law change requiring a 15 percent reduction in its restaurant space.

== Description ==
The plaza contains 277 units, most notably the 115 restaurants occupying a majority of its space but also other businesses such as pharmacies and grocery stores. While the plaza most prominently offers Middle Eastern and South Asian cuisine, many other regional cuisines are found at the plaza's restaurants. The plaza is similar in design to other suburban strip malls and is situated in a primarily car-dependent area. However, Sneha Mandhan, an assistant professor of urban planning at Toronto Metropolitan University has stated the plaza felt like a courtyard due to how its buildings surround the parking lot.

The plaza calls itself North America's largest halal food market. Its halal offerings have made it popular with locals and have attracted visitors from across North America. The plaza is a community hub and popular late-night gathering spot particularly among Middle Eastern and South Asian immigrant communities. Mandhan commented that it felt especially comfortable for women at night. Many of the plaza's restaurants remain open late, particularly during Ramadan when many of them change their hours. Local police have stated it can draw up to 6,000 patrons at once, with gatherings often occurring in the parking lot due to a lack of public spaces nearby. The plaza is managed as a commercial condominium, which it registered as in March 2023.

== History ==
As part of the GTA Development Corporation's Erin Mills Commercial Centre project, land adjacent to the intersection of Eglinton Avenue and Ridgeway Drive was slated to be developed as retail space. The plaza was approved for construction there in 2021 and it opened in the spring of 2022. By August 2023, the plaza had gained a reputation for poor traffic control, as well as excessive garbage and noise. Dangerous driving also became a common problem in the area. In late 2023, over 1,700 local residents petitioned for an increased police presence in the area following several large unsanctioned events. Local traffic conditions became problematic with a lack of available parking in the plaza, poor local bus service in the area, and a design prioritizing access by car. At the time, Mississauga officials stated the city had always planned for a shopping centre in the area but the developer made it a food destination without city input. In September 2024, Mississauga City Council approved a temporary by-law change preventing new restaurants and other "parking-intensive uses" from opening, which was later extended to January 2026 while the city conducted a transportation study.

=== Court injunction and zoning change (2025–present) ===
On August 13, 2025, the Ontario Superior Court granted Mississauga a temporary injunction to crack down on gatherings of over 3,000 people which were expected during Pakistan and Afghanistan's independence days that month. At the time, businesses in the plaza contended the injunction hurt business, with one restaurant owner noting a 40% drop in sales from the same week in 2024. Business owners also stated they were only given one day of notice, after workers' shifts had been scheduled. Following the injunction's end, about 100 business owners in the plaza formed a business association.

Later that year, Mississauga completed its transportation study of the plaza, recommending a 15 percent cut to its total restaurant area. The city's report noted parking in the plaza was operating close to capacity during evenings and weekends. City officials stated at the time that it had received 112 complaints about the plaza since it opened. In January 2026, Mississauga City Council approved a zoning by-law change in line with the study's recommendations despite a petition from the plaza's business owners against it. The change allows existing restaurant space to remain as long as it continues to be used for that purpose. In April 2026, the plaza's owners agreed with the City of Mississauga through legal mediation to implement and pay for additional security measures including access gates, security cameras, and additional security staff during busy evenings.

Continued high parking demand prompted a proposal for a four-storey parking garage near the plaza, supported by the incumbent Mississauga Mayor Carolyn Parrish. New local council candidates and mayoral candidates Dipika Damerla and Alvin Tedjo additionally called for creating a public space for gatherings outside of or replacing the existing surface parking lot, noting the cultural significance of the plaza.
