= Dixie, Mississauga =

Dixie Fountain Hill, Fonthill, Onion Town, Irishtown, Cork Town, Sydenham
- Neighbourhood
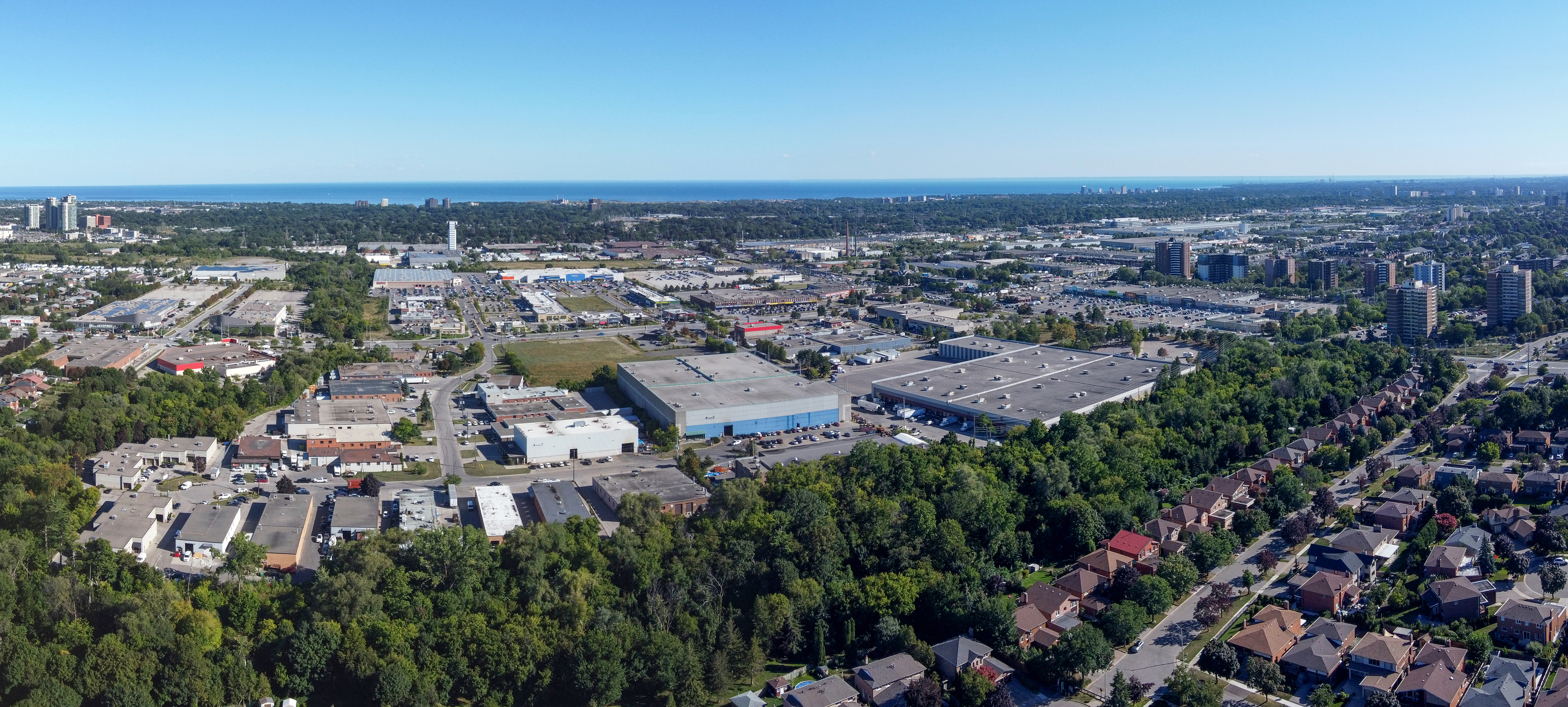
- Aerial view of Dixie, Mississauga in 2022
- Interactive map of Dixie
- Coordinates: 43°35′51″N 79°36′5″W
- Country: Canada
- Province: Ontario
- Regional municipality: Peel
- City: Mississauga
- Time zone: UTC-5 (Eastern)
  - Summer (DST): UTC-4 (Eastern)
- Forward sortation area: L4X and L4Y
- Area codes: 905 and 289
- NTS Map: 030M12
- GNBC Code: FAWWY

Dixie is a neighbourhood in the city of Mississauga, Ontario, Canada. The community lies in the southeastern part of the city and is one of the older neighbourhoods in the city.

The name of the neighbourhood dates back to the Village of Dixie at the corner of Dixie Road and Dundas Street West in the south part of the city. In 1865, the village of Sydenham was renamed in honour of Beaumont Wilson Bowen Dixie (1819-1898), a Welsh settler who paid for the establishment of the Union Chapel, a multi-denominational Protestant church in the village originally built in 1816 (and rebuilt in 1837). The church is also home to St. John's Dixie Union Cemetery, an active cemetery since 1816. The Chapel was built from donations from the Cody family of Buffalo Bill fame and was where his son was baptized in 1847.

Today, much of the area is commercial or industrial use with a small area of residential homes east of Dixie Road.
