= Erin Mills =

- Suburban district
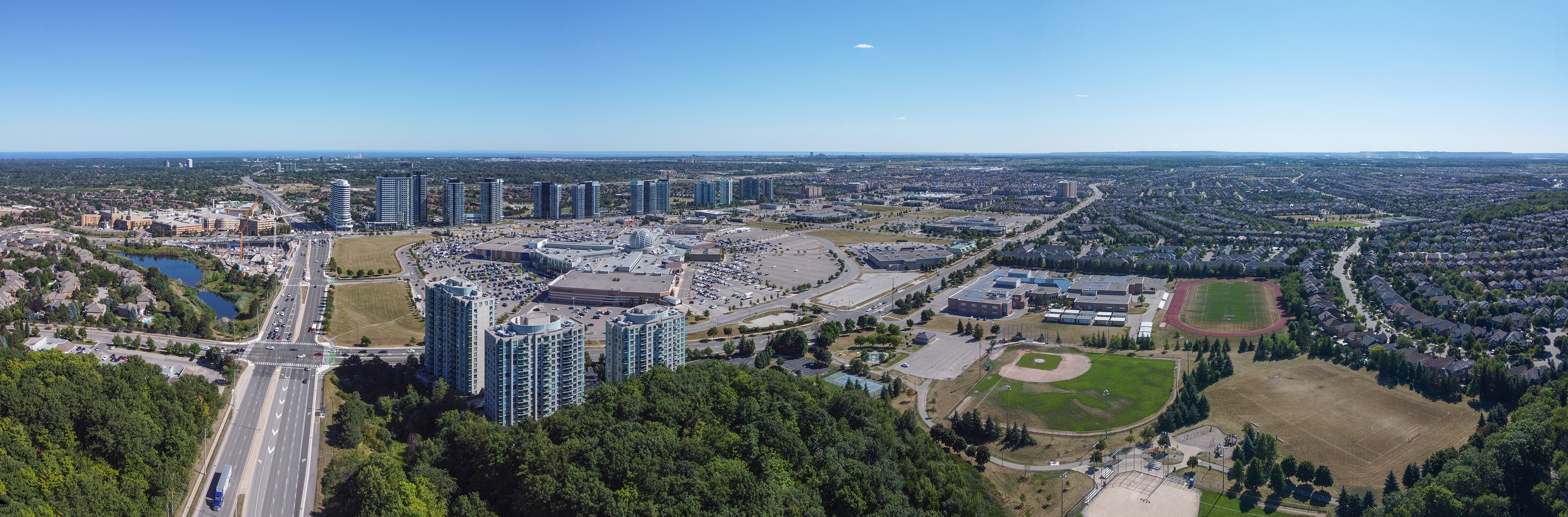
- Aerial view of Erin Mills Town Centre
- Interactive map of Erin Mills
- Coordinates: 43°32′52″N 79°42′26″W
- Country: Canada
- Province: Ontario
- Regional municipality: Peel
- City: Mississauga
- Established: Early 1940s-60s (est.)

Government
  - MP: Iqra Khalid (Liberal)
  - MPP: Sheref Sabawy (PC)
  - Councillors: Sue McFadden (Ward 10)

Population (2021)
  - Total: 123,371
- Forward sortation area: L5L and L5M

Erin Mills is a large suburban district in the city of Mississauga, Ontario, Canada, approximately 32 km (20 mi) west of Downtown Toronto. It boundaries are from Dundas Street, in the south, to approximately Britannia Road in the north, and from Winston Churchill Boulevard in the west, to the Credit River in the east, although it extends west to Ninth Line south of Highway 403, and has an irregular northern boundary in the extreme northeast where it borders Streetsville.

Based on census boundaries, the 2021 population was estimated at 123,371 as of the Canada 2021 Census, making it the most populous but not the most densely populated area in Mississauga. This is a 0.7 increase from the 2016 population of 122,560.

Erin Mills is an integrated residential, industrial and, commercial community, with commercial uses concentrated in the centre and industrial uses on the periphery.

The namesake Erin Mills Parkway is a major north-south artery that mostly follows the course of the former Fifth Line West through the district.

== History ==
Starting in the early 1970s, Erin Mills was developed as a "new town" by the Cadillac Fairview Corporation on over 7,000 acres (28 km^{2}) of farmland, with the area between Dundas Street and Burnhamthorpe Road being the first section to be developed. Cadillac Fairview inherited the development from E. P. Taylor's Don Mills Development Corporation, which acquired land in the 1950s and coined the area's name. Taylor sold the development to Cadillac Fairview in 1968. The Erin in the name pays homage to the historic Erindale to the south, with Mills being either a counterpart to Don Mills, an earlier development by E. P. Taylor in North York (now part of Toronto), or to the various mills along the Credit River to the east. The closest mill was found along Eglinton Avenue in the former hamlet of Barberton, that once was built around the Toronto Woollen (Mills) Factory owned by brothers Robert and William Barber.
