= Silvia Gualtieri =

Canadian politician

Silvia Gualtieri MPP
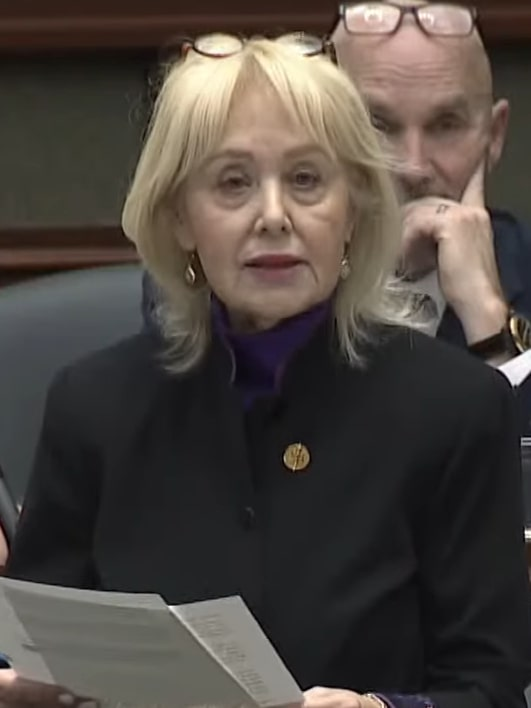
- Gualtieri in 2025

Member of the Ontario Provincial Parliament for Mississauga East—Cooksville
- Incumbent
- Assumed office February 27, 2025
- Preceded by: Kaleed Rasheed

Personal details
- Party: Progressive Conservative
- Relations: Rudy Cuzzetto (brother); Patrick Brown (son-in-law)

Silvia Gualtieri is the Member of Provincial Parliament for Mississauga East—Cooksville, a member of the Progressive Conservative Party of Ontario.

Gualtieri defeated Ontario Liberal Party leader and former mayor of Mississauga Bonnie Crombie in the 2025 Ontario provincial election, winning 46.5% of the vote to Crombie's 43.1%. She succeeds Kaleed Rasheed, who was elected as a PC candidate but resigned from the party over his relationship with a developer involved in the Greenbelt scandal.

Gualtieri ran in the 2022 Mississauga municipal election for the position of Ward 2 councillor, looking to take a seat without an incumbent. She placed third.

Gualtieri is the sister of Rudy Cuzzetto, MPP for Mississauga—Lakeshore, and the mother-in-law of Patrick Brown, mayor of Brampton.

== Electoral record ==
2025 Ontario general election: Mississauga East—Cooksville
Party	Candidate	Votes	%	±%
Progressive Conservative	Silvia Gualtieri	16,764	46.69	+5.78
Liberal	Bonnie Crombie	15,554	43.32	+5.97
New Democratic	Alex Venuto	1,879	5.23	–5.60
Green	David Zeni	744	2.07	–1.91
New Blue	Kevin Peck	429	1.19	–3.54
Independent	Syed Hussain	223	0.62	N/A
Independent	Mark De Pelham	205	0.57	N/A
Ontario Party	Vittoria Trichilo	192	0.53	–1.32
Moderate	Oleksandra Iakolieva	118	0.33	–0.03
Total valid votes		35,903	99.39	+0.04
Total rejected, unmarked and declined ballots		222	0.61	–0.04
Turnout		36,125	41.28	+1.70
Eligible voters		87,521		
Progressive Conservative hold		Swing		–0.10
Source(s): "Candidates in: Mississauga East—Cooksville (061)". Elections Ontario.; D'Andrea, Aaron (28 January 2025). "Liberals' Bonnie Crombie chooses riding as Doug Ford readies early Ontario vote". Global News. Cornwell, Steve (28 January 2025). "'Fired up': Ontario Liberal leader Bonnie Crombie announces Mississauga riding she's running in ahead of possible Feb. 27 election". Mississauga.com.; "Mississauga East—Cooksville Unofficial Election Results". Elections Ontario. 28 February 2025.
