= 2026 Brampton municipal election =

Municipal election

2026 Brampton mayoral election
- October 26, 2026
- Turnout: 28.77% (▲4.21pp)
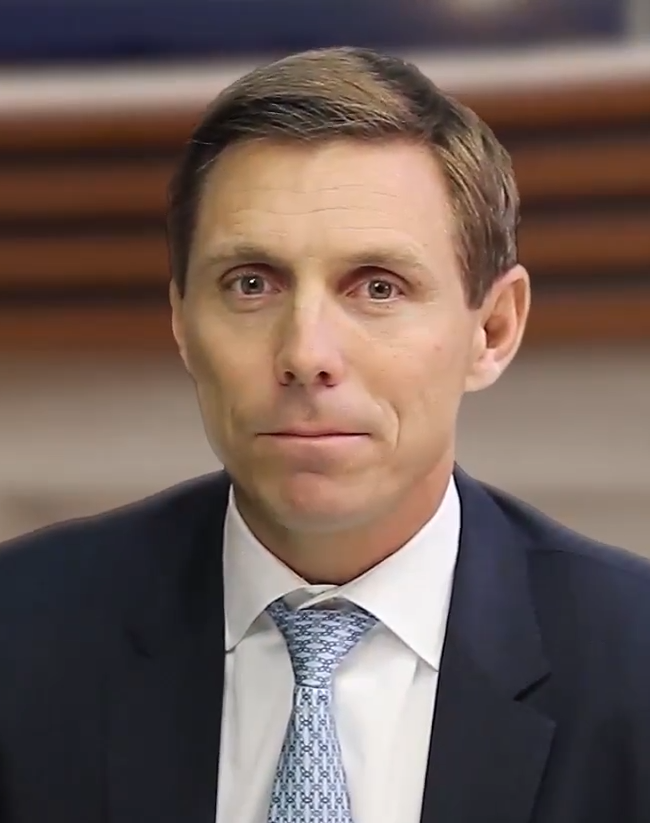
Candidate	Patrick Brown	Wesley Jackson
Popular vote	65,893	23,236
Percentage	54.90%	19.36%
Candidate	Prabh Gill	Jagruti Bhatt
Popular vote	15,257	6,394
Percentage	12.71%	5.33%
Mayor before election
Patrick Brown
Elected mayor
Patrick Brown

The 2026 Brampton municipal election, scheduled for October 26, 2026, is part of the municipal elections in Peel Region and Ontario. The positions of mayor, five regional councillors, five city councillors, and trustees for four school boards will be chosen. After the elections, council will choose three city councillors to be made regional councillors.

== Mayoral election ==
The office of incumbent mayor Patrick Brown confirmed on May 1 that he would run for re-election.

Brampton Guardian notes that 2022 legislation changes introducing strong mayors to Ontario makes the position particularly significant to the operation of cities.

Registered candidates

- Jagruti Bhatt, who did not respond to The Brampton Guardian when asked for her platform
- Patrick Brown, incumbent
- Gurdeep Singh Dhothar, who did not list any contact information in their registration and did not make themselves available to The Brampton Guardian
- Vidya Sagar Gautam, who did not reply to The Brampton Guardian survey, candidate for mayor in the 2022 election, candidate for Region of Peel chair in 2018, candidate for Regional council in 2014
- Prabh Gill
- Wesley Jackson, real estate attorney, candidate for Mayor in 2018
- Najma Khurram, who Brampton Guardian reports has very little information online and who did not respond to the Guardian for a survey
- Nathaniel Peart, who Brampton Guardian reports has very little information online
- Prabhjot Kaur Sidhu, who has no contact info, website, or social media known and who did not make themselves available to The Brampton Guardian for a survey
- Sandeep Somal, works for a non-profit organization, founder of a hockey club for low-income and racialized youth
- Paul Terriwal, real estate agent in Brampton since 2011 who did not respond to The Brampton Guardian survey
- Gaurav Walia, who has no contact info, website, or social media known, and shares a name and may be the same person as the People's Party of Canada candidate for Brampton East in the 2019 Canadian federal election

Avi Dhaliwal, Gursimranjit Singh, and Tirth Vinodkumar Patel all withdrew their candidacy.

=== Endorsements ===
- Patrick Brown: LiUNA Local 183, LiUNA Local 506, Peel Regional Police Association
- Prabh Gill: withdrawn mayoral candidate Avi Dhaliwal
- Wesley Jackson: former Brampton city councillor Jeff Bowman, former Brampton regional councillor John Sanderson, former Brampton Board of Trade president F. Charles Waud, former Brampton city councillor Doug Whillans

=== Results ===
Candidate	Vote	%
Patrick Brown (X)	65,893	54.90
Wesley Jackson	23,236	19.36
Prabh Gill	15,257	12.71
Jagruti Bhatt	6,394	5.33
Sandeep Somal	2,371	1.98
Nathaniel Peart	1,704	1.42
Vidya Sagar Gautam	1,213	1.01
Prabhjot Kaur Sidhu	1,104	0.92
Gurdeep Singh Dhothar	912	0.76
Najma Khurram	891	0.74
Paul Tarriwal	598	0.50
Gaurav Walia	452	0.38

== City Council elections ==
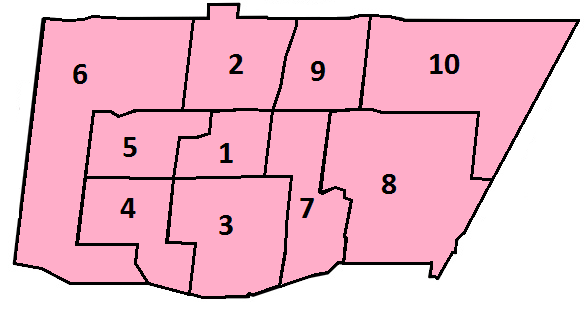
Map of Brampton's wards

=== Wards 1, 5 ===
Incumbent city councillor Rowena Santos has registered for the election. She serves as a Regional councillor through a choice of city council.

Registered candidates

- Gagandeep Singh Atwal, immigration consultant
- Tajinder Singh Bhinder, renovation contractor, realtor
- Staceyann Brooks, did not reply to a survey from Brampton Guardian, previously a candidate in the 2022 municipal election
- Amit Dutta, herbalist
- Tracy Ann Pepe, scent training
- Rowena Santos, incumbent
- Tejpal Sidhu
- Romolo TanTalo, HVAC business owner, who has spoken at council about homeless encampments
- Khimani Williams, one of the City of Brampton's Welcoming Streets Leaders, did not reply to the survey from Brampton Guardian

Results

Candidate	Vote	%
Rowena Santos (X)	7,555	37.43
Staceyann Brooks	4,802	23.79
Tracy Ann Pepe	3,796	18.81
Tajinder Singh Bhinder	1,226	6.07
Gagandeep Singh Atwal	727	3.60
Amit Dutta	705	3.49
Khimani Williams	636	3.15
Romolo Tantalo	406	2.01
Tejpal Sidhu	333	1.65

=== Wards 2, 6 ===
Incumbent Navjit Kaur Brar was chosen by council to serve as a Regional councillor in the most recent term of council, in one of Brampton's two additional seats.

Registered candidates

- Navjit Kaur Brar, incumbent. She did not reply to a survey request from Brampton Guardian.
- Jermaine Chambers, who did not reply to a survey request from Brampton Guardian.
- Yadvinder Deswal, who did not provide contact information.
- Raghav Dhir, software quality manager and realtor
- Amir Khawaja Hassan, accountant
- Gurpreet Pabla, marketer
- Keval Shah, realtor
- Rakesh Singh Thakur, who did not reply to a survey request from Brampton Guardian.
- Carmen Wilson, who did not reply to a survey request from Brampton Guardian.

Results

Candidate	Vote	%
Navjit Kaur Brar (X)	9,656	36.30
Jermaine Chambers	5,497	20.67
Carmen Wilson	4,769	17.93
Raghav Dhir	2,950	11.09
Keval Shah	2,208	8.30
Amir Khawaja Hassan	779	2.93
Gurpreet Pabla	340	1.28
Yadvinder Deswal	243	0.91
Rakesh Singh Thakur	157	0.59

=== Wards 3, 4 ===
Only two candidates in this race, incumbent Dennis Keenan and Ajit Seerha, replied to a survey request by Brampton Guardian.

Registered candidates

- Gita Devi Dawadi Dhakal, did not reply to a survey from Brampton Guardian
- Dennis Keenan, incumbent
- Jugraj Singh Khinda, industrial design student, did not reply to a survey from Brampton Guardian
- Kaniki Karine Mujinga, did not reply to a survey from Brampton Guardian
- Santokh Randhawa, did not reply to a survey from Brampton Guardian
- Ajit Seerha, real estate broker

Chris Campbell, retired Carpenters' Union Local 27 president withdrew his candidacy.

Results

Candidate	Vote	%
Dennis Keenan (X)	12,962	66.11
Gita Devi Dawadi Dhakal	2,486	12.68
Jugraj Singh Khinda	2,320	11.83
Santokh Randhawa	807	4.12
Kaniki Karine Mujinga	520	2.65
Ajit Seerha	511	2.61

=== Wards 7, 8 ===
Registered candidates

- Nayan Brahmbhatt
- Ripudaman Singh Dhillon
- Ayanna Kahlon
- Ali Khan
- Rakesha Sharma
- Monica Singh Soares

On the withdrawal of Regional council incumbent Pat Fortini, city council incumbent Rod Power withdrew to run for this position.

Results

Candidate	Vote	%
Taran Chahal	6,573	30.85
Monica Singh Soares	4,414	20.72
Ayanna Kahlon	3,617	16.97
Nayan Brahmbhatt	2,318	10.88
Ripudaman Singh Dhillon	2,233	10.48
Ali Khan	1,237	5.81
Rakesh Sharma	916	4.30

=== Wards 9, 10 ===
Registered candidates

- Janice Gordon-Daniels, certified reflexologist, Brampton School Traffic Safety Council member, 2018 candidate for trustee, 2022 candidate for Wards 9 and 10
- Azad Goyat, 2022 Regional council candidate for Wards 9 and 10, 2025 Ontario general election independent candidate in Brampton East
- Jagdish Grewal Singh
- Kamran Hassan
- Sandeep Kumar
- Baljinder Singh Nehal
- Cheryl Rodricks
- Harkirat Singh, incumbent, appointed to the position of Deputy Mayor in the last term of council

Results

Candidate	Vote	%
Harkirat Singh (X)	8,393	29.00
Azad Goyat	5,282	18.25
Janice Gordon-Daniels	5,273	18.22
Baljinder Singh Nehal	2,810	9.71
Cheryl Rodricks	2,606	9.00
Jagdish Singh Grewal	1,885	6.51
Sandeep Kumar	1,817	6.28
Kamran Hassan	876	3.03

== Regional Council elections ==
=== Wards 1, 5 ===
Incumbent Regional councillor Paul Vicente is running in the election.

Registered candidates

- Steven Lee, proposal co-ordinator and estimator, candidate in the same ward for city council in 2022
- Idris Orughu, project manager and former financial planner, ran in the 2022 municipal election in the same contest
- Paul Vicente, incumbent, did not reply to a survey request from Brampton Guardian
- Pooja Walia, works in relation to a retirement home

Results

Candidate	Vote	%
Paul Vicente (X)	9,914	49.35
Idris Orughu	4,641	23.10
Steven Lee	2,933	14.60
Pooja Walia	2,601	12.95

=== Wards 2, 6 ===
Registered candidates

- Romy Dogra
- Prempal Gill
- Julie Luckasavitch
- Michael Paul Palleschi, incumbent
- Parth Sharma
- Ajaib Singh Sran
- Sameer Tandon

Results

Candidate	Vote	%
Michael Paul Palleschi (X)	14,856	56.66
Julie Luckasavitch	3,329	12.70
Prempal Gill	2,789	10.64
Parth Sharma	2,039	7.78
Sameer Tandon	1,510	5.76
Romy Dogra	1,111	4.24
Ajaib Singh Sran	585	2.23

=== Wards 3, 4 ===
- Manmeet Singh Choudhary, Software Engineering Associate
- Sandeep Kumar Goel, immigration consultant, travel agent
- Navneet Singh Lotey, unspecified entrepreneur
- Martin Medeiros, incumbent, provincial candidate in 2025 election

Results

Candidate	Vote	%
Martin Medeiros (X)	13,235	66.92
Sandeep Kumar Goel	2,797	14.14
Navneet Singh Lotey	2,253	11.39
Manmeet Singh Choudhary	1,492	7.54

=== Wards 7, 8 ===
Incumbent Pat Fortini withdrew from the contest on its final day, and was replaced by Rod Power. He was elected in 2014, serving three terms. In an interview with Brampton Guardian, he shared that he and his wife had plans to relocate to Caledon after purchasing a home in the Town. He is a candidate for Ward 4 in his new community's municipal election.

Registered candidates

- Rod Power
- Anil Sahajpal
- Aman Sharma
- Christopher Soranno
- Cynthia Sri Pragash
- Vedaant Vyas

Ripudaman Singh Dhillon withdrew to run as city council candidate in the same wards.

Results

Candidate	Vote	%
Rod Power	11,348	53.61
Aman Sharma	3,236	15.29
Christopher Soranno	2,708	12.79
Anil Sahajpal	1,429	6.75
Cynthia Sri Pragash	1,417	6.69
Vedaant Vyas	1,029	4.86

=== Wards 9, 10 ===
Incumbent Regional councillor Gurpartap Singh Toor did not run for re-election, after serving a single term. He did not comment on the choice, when Brampton Guardian requested an interview.

Satpaul Singh Johal served as the Peel District School Board trustee for Brampton Wards 9, 10 in the 2022–2026 term, and was elected as vice-chair of the board. Gurpreet Singh Dhillon was a member of council from 2014 to 2022. Six of eleven members of council opposed Mayor Patrick Brown on various matters, including suggesting his mode of governance was undemocratic. He was accused of sexual misconduct during a foreign trade mission, however since has claimed the allegations are proven false.

Registered candidates

- Michael Dancy, candidate in the 2022 election in the same wards at the regional level
- Prabhjot Singh Dhaliwal
- Gurpreet Singh Dhillon, management consultant, former councillor
- Gurpreet K. Dhillon
- Satpaul Singh Johal, school trustee, immigration consultant (as of 2014) and journalist for Daily Ajit
- Nirmala Devi Madhu
- Gregory Miller
- Sukhman Sangha
- Harsimran Singh

Results

Candidate	Vote	%
Sukhman Sangha	7,406	25.24
Gurpreet Singh Dhillon	7,120	24.26
Michael Dancy	4,124	14.05
Satpaul Singh Johal	3,228	11.00
Gregory Miller	2,531	8.62
Nirmala Devi Madhu	1,817	6.19
Harsimran Singh	1,308	4.46
Gurpreet K. Dhillon	1,171	3.99
Prabhjot Singh Dhaliwal	640	2.18
