= Patrick Brown (Canadian politician) =

Canadian politician (born 1978)

His Worship Patrick Brown
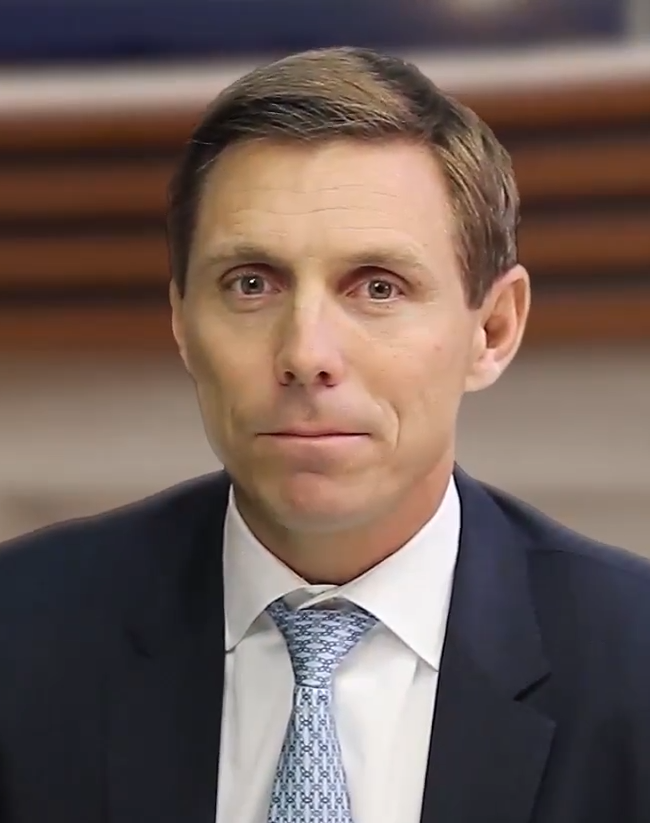
- Brown in 2017

51st Mayor of Brampton
- Incumbent
- Assumed office December 1, 2018
- Deputy: Harkirat Singh
- Preceded by: Linda Jeffrey

Leader of the Official Opposition in Ontario
- In office September 14, 2015 – January 25, 2018
- Preceded by: Jim Wilson
- Succeeded by: Vic Fedeli

Leader of the Progressive Conservative Party of Ontario
- In office May 9, 2015 – January 25, 2018
- Preceded by: Jim Wilson (interim)
- Succeeded by: Vic Fedeli (interim)
Parliamentary constituencies
Member of the Ontario Provincial Parliament for Simcoe North
In office September 3, 2015 – June 7, 2018
Preceded by	Garfield Dunlop
Succeeded by	Jill Dunlop
Member of Parliament for Barrie
In office January 23, 2006 – May 13, 2015
Preceded by	Aileen Carroll
Succeeded by	Riding dissolved

Personal details
- Born: Patrick Walter Brown; May 26, 1978 (age 48) Toronto, Ontario, Canada
- Party: Independent (municipal)
- Other political affiliations: Conservative (federal); Progressive Conservative (provincial, until 2018)
- Spouse: Genevieve Gualtieri (m. 2018)
- Children: 3
- Relatives: Joe Tascona (uncle); Silvia Gualtieri (mother-in-law)
- Education: St. Michael's College School University of Toronto (B.A.) University of Windsor (LL.B.)
- Profession: Politician; lawyer

Patrick Walter Brown (born May 26, 1978) is a Canadian politician who has served as the 51st and current mayor of Brampton since 2018. He served as leader of the Official Opposition in Ontario and leader of the Ontario Progressive Conservative (PC) Party from 2015 to 2018. Brown also represented the riding Barrie in the House of Commons as a Conservative from 2006 to 2015.

Brown entered politics when he won a seat on the Barrie City Council in 2000. He later joined the Conservative Party and became a member of Parliament (MP) in 2006. He represented Barrie in the House of Commons until 2015, when he was elected as leader of the Ontario PC Party and resigned his seat in Parliament. Brown was subsequently elected to represent Simcoe North in the Legislative Assembly of Ontario and became the leader of the Opposition. He served as leader until 2018, after his resignation and expulsion from the caucus due to sexual misconduct allegations. He later returned to municipal politics and was elected mayor of Brampton the same year.

In 2022, Brown contested for the federal Conservative leadership election, but was disqualified following claims that his campaign violated the Canada Elections Act. He was subsequently re-elected as mayor of Brampton, and won a third term in 2026.

== Early life and career ==
Brown was born in Toronto, to Judy (née Tascona) and lawyer Edmond Brown. His father moved to Canada from the British Isles and worked as a criminal lawyer. Edmond was a former federal New Democratic Party candidate for the riding of Davenport in 1979 and 1980. His mother, Judy, is of partial Italian descent, and an educator (teacher and principal) from Barrie. He was raised in the Roman Catholic faith.

He graduated from St. Michael's College School, a private Catholic school in Toronto. He studied political science at the University of Toronto, and graduated with a law degree from the University of Windsor. During his second year at law school, he was one of 10 recipients of the As Prime Minister Award. He worked for Magna International in their legal department for four years.

Brown served two terms as president of the Progressive Conservative Youth Federation (PCYF), a position he held from 1998 to 2002. He also served on the executive of the Progressive Conservative Party of Ontario, as a vice president. As PCYF President, Brown was one of the early supporters of a united right and was criticized for his decision to support a united right from party leader Joe Clark and Member of Parliament Scott Brison. Brown was later re-elected as PCYF president with 81 per cent of the vote against Jonathan Frate of Manitoba. Brown was the Deputy Chairman of the International Young Democrat Union (IYDU). He has also represented Canada on a number of international assistance projects hosted by the IYDU.

== Early political career ==
=== Barrie City Council ===
Brown was elected to the Barrie City Council in 2000 at age 22, and was re-elected in 2003. He served on various committees, including the Budget Committee. Brown's primary focus while on council was health care, despite it being a provincial responsibility. In response to a shortage of doctors, Brown founded the Physician Recruitment Task Force with the Royal Victoria Hospital to help attract more doctors to Barrie.

=== Member of Parliament (2006–2015) ===
In the lead up to the 2004 federal election, Brown put his name forward as a candidate for the Conservative Party nomination race for the riding of Barrie. Brown defeated Rod Jackson and Douglas Edwards to win the party nomination in what Jackson considered a nasty race. In the election, he lost to Liberal incumbent Aileen Carroll by 1,295 votes. Brown ran again in 2006, this time defeating Carroll by 1,543 votes.

He was re-elected in the 2008 election by 15,195 votes over Liberal candidate Rick Jones.

In November 2010, the Canadian Taxpayers Federation expressed concern about how Patrick Brown used his House of Commons of Canada account. He sent flyers to his riding which included a letter of support and a flyer from Barrie City Councillor Michael Prowse. Brown used his House of Commons account to pay for the mailing because Michael Prowse could not afford to send the flyer out himself.

In the 2011 election, Brown was elected to his third term in office. In 2012, it was reported that Brown had the highest publicly funded expenditures on public service announcement flyers with $81,159.97.

In September 2014, he announced his intention to run in the 2015 Ontario PC party leadership election. He registered as a leadership candidate on November 20, 2014. He said that, unlike the other candidates, he was not involved in the four consecutive losses that have kept the Ontario PCs out of power since 2003. At the time of his jump to provincial politics, he chaired the Conservative Party of Canada's Greater Toronto Area caucus and the Canada-India Parliamentary Association.

==== Hockey Night in Barrie ====
In 2007, Brown founded a charity hockey game known as Hockey Night in Barrie. Hockey Night in Barrie was a yearly summer event hosted at the Barrie Molson Centre that had participation from current and former NHLers, known personalities from across Canada, and locals from the police department, fire department, and hospitals in Simcoe County. All funds raised from each game contributed to local hospitals and charities in the Simcoe County region. Hockey Night in Barrie raised $2 million, with the majority of proceeds going towards the development of the Royal Victoria Regional Health Centre's Cancer Centre and a new eight-bed youth mental health inpatient unit. In addition to the Royal Victoria Regional Health Centre, the game also supported for the Orillia Soldiers' Memorial Hospital and Georgian Bay General Hospital for the 9th annual charity game in 2016. Money raised from the game contributed to the Orillia Soldiers' Memorial Hospital's new Neo-Natal Intensive Care Unit. The game has featured NHL players like Connor McDavid, Aaron Ekblad, Steven Stamkos, Rick Nash, Brian Little, Mark Scheifele, and Andrew Mangiapane, former NHLers such as Wendell Clark, Darcy Tucker, Mike Gartner, Dale Hawerchuk, Bernie Nicholls, Gary Roberts, and Shane Corson, and has featured personalities like Prime Minister Stephen Harper, Hockey Night in Canada's Don Cherry and Ron Maclean, Ontario journalist Steve Paikin, Alan Thicke, Walter Gretzky and Jennifer Robinson, among others. In 2018, Brown passed on organizational leadership to Barrie-Springwater-Oro-Medonte MP Alex Nuttall for its eleventh annual charity hockey game.

== Provincial politics (2014–2018) ==
On September 28, 2014, Brown announced his intention to run in the contest to replace Progressive Conservative leader Tim Hudak. From the outset of his campaign, Brown positioned himself as an outsider, challenging the leadership of the PC Party, which had been defeated in the last four provincial elections. In the most recent election campaign, in 2014, the party election platform included a commitment to cut 100,000 public service jobs over 4 years through attrition. As the only one of the original five leadership candidates who was not a member of the Ontario legislature, Brown was not involved in the promise, which he considered ill-advised, Brown's rivals attempted to use this same lack of previous involvement in provincial politics as an argument against his leadership bid.

In March, Brown emerged as the front-runner in the leadership election, having sold over 40,000 of the 70,000 memberships in the party. During the campaign, Brown was successful in bringing many new members to the party, many of whom came from ethnic communities. The past four leadership contests had been won by those who sold the most memberships.

Brown was endorsed by the Campaign Life Coalition and the Ontario Landowners Association. During Brown's leadership bid both special interest groups actively supported him by selling Ontario PC Party memberships amongst their members.

Brown was criticized by his main rival, Christine Elliott, for not resigning his federal seat during the leadership campaign. Brown was absent from the House of Commons for some votes during the leadership campaign, attending 56 per cent of the votes from September to December in 2014. However, his overall attendance for votes in 2014 was 83 per cent. A spokesperson for Prime Minister Stephen Harper confirmed that members are not expected to step down but are expected to "continue to fulfill their parliamentary responsibilities, including membership on committees and attendance at votes."

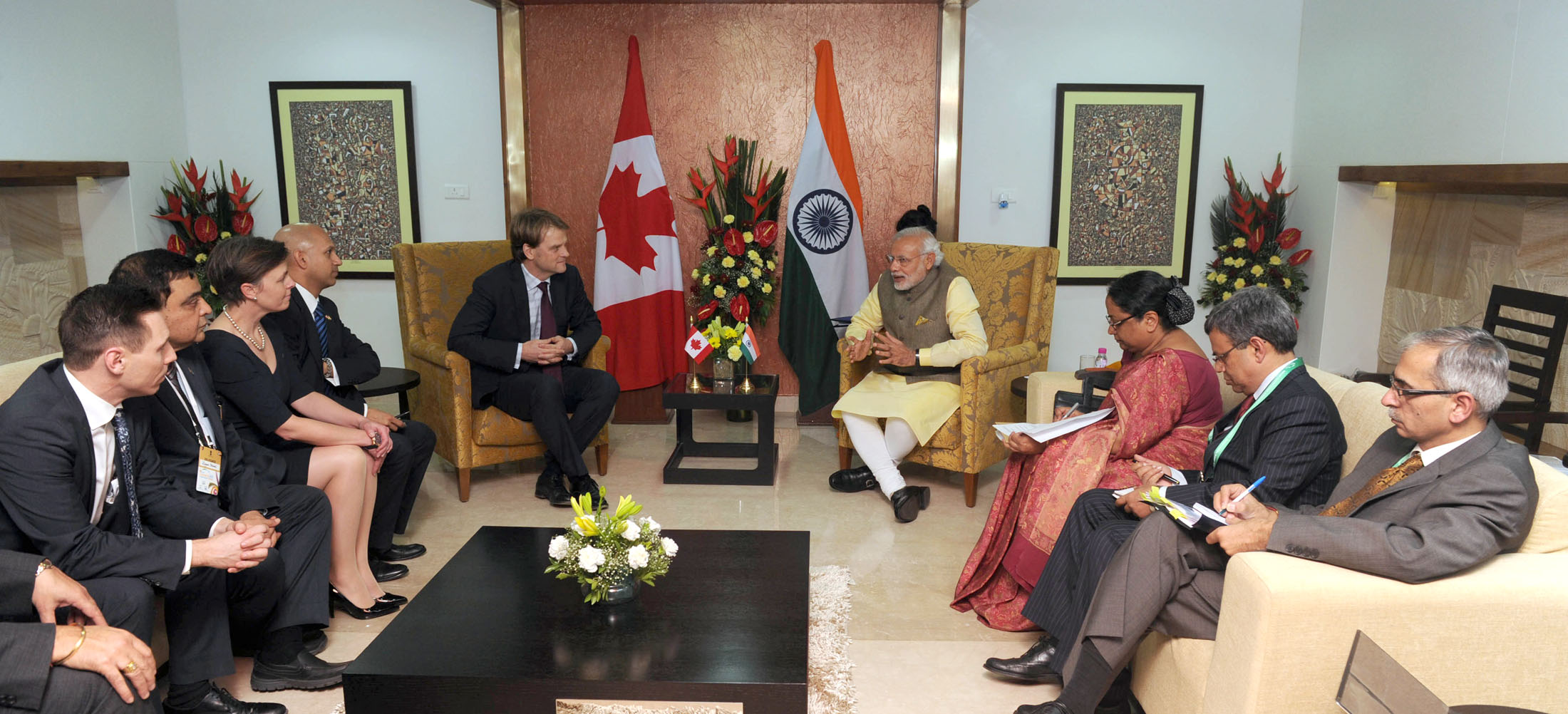
Brown in India as part of a Canadian delegation led by Chris Alexander in 2015.

=== Progressive Conservative leader (2015–2018) ===
The campaign started with five candidates including Vic Fedeli, Lisa MacLeod, and Monte McNaughton. All three withdrew in early 2015 citing membership recruitment or financial reasons.

On May 9, 2015, Brown was elected leader, defeating his only remaining opponent, Christine Elliott, winning with 61.8 per cent of the membership vote.

Brown resigned his seat in the House of Commons on May 13, 2015, after winning the leadership and led the Progressive Conservative party from outside the legislature during most of the summer. On July 22, 2015, Garfield Dunlop agreed to step down as MPP for Simcoe North on August 1 in order to open up a seat for Brown. A provincial by-election, called for September 3, 2015, was won by Brown.

Under his leadership, the Ontario PC Party won five by-elections, including Sault Ste. Marie and Scarborough-Rouge River, two seats which had been previously held by the governing Liberals. Despite his record, Brown faced accusations of corruption and favouritism over hand picked candidates and unfair nomination contests.

=== Sexual misconduct allegations and resignation ===
On January 24, 2018, Brown was accused by two women of engaging in sexual misconduct, which dated back to the time he was a federal MP. Brown denied the allegations and initially refused to step down. Four senior staffers from Brown's campaign had advised him that he should resign as party leader; he did not accept their advice. In consequence all four staffers resigned from his campaign team. After pressure from within the party, he resigned as leader in the early hours of January 25. A day later, fellow MPP, Lisa MacLeod revealed that she heard rumours about similar allegations from former National Hockey League player Eric Lindros. Dimitri Soudas, former director of communications to Prime Minister Stephen Harper and volunteer for the campaign, suggested the allegations were baseless, saying, “All media organizations were turning over every single stone that they could find, and they couldn’t find anything.” A Globe and Mail article revealed that Brown's staff had expressed similar concern with Brown's past relationships after he became leader. One of these was with Tamara Macgregor, a former staffer within Brown's office and daughter of Karma Macgregor, a former PC candidate.

The day after he resigned, Brown was succeeded on an interim basis by Nipissing MPP Vic Fedeli. Fedeli, who was unanimously elected by caucus, asked Brown to take a leave of absence from Queen's Park while he defended himself against the allegations. In addition, Fedeli announced that he would not sign Brown's nomination papers if he attempted to run in a Barrie riding at the June 7 provincial election. Brown had intended on running in Barrie—Springwater—Oro-Medonte in that election, but Fedeli's announcement would mean that he would have to run as an independent.

In one incident, there was an allegation that Brown exposed himself to a teenager and asked her to engage in oral sex after plying her with alcohol. The accuser alleged that she was an 18-year-old high school student when the oral sex incident occurred; but on February 13, three weeks after the first public report, she amended her claim to say she was a year older than she had previously maintained, and was therefore over the legal drinking age. Corrections were subsequently made on the initial news articles. In the other incident, Brown was alleged to have kissed, without consent, a female aide in his employ while in his bedroom. Brown later took a lie detector test and claimed that he felt his name was cleared. No charges were laid as a result of either alleged incident and on April 23, 2018, he sued CTV for $8 million in damages. He then entered the Ontario PC leadership race less than two hours before the deadline.

In March 2022, Brown and CTV reached a settlement, where CTV expressed "regrets" over the incorrect reporting of certain details in the article; no money was paid out to Brown by CTV as part of the settlement.

==== Expulsion from PC caucus and brief second run for the leadership ====
Brown was ejected from the PC caucus on February 16, 2018, following reports that he was claiming he hadn't actually resigned as party leader and a series of Facebook posts in which he attacked the credibility of his accusers. Later that same day, Brown registered as a candidate for the Progressive Conservative leadership election, pending approval from the party, and on February 21, after being vetted, Brown was given the "green light" by the PC Party to run for the leadership.

Brown officially launched his second leadership campaign on February 18 with a rally in Mississauga.

On February 20, PC MPP Randy Hillier filed complaints to the Ontario integrity commissioner alleging that Brown had breached the province's ethics rules around down payments over his 2016 purchase of a $2.3 million waterfront house on Lake Simcoe, a loan from a friend and undeclared travels. The house was listed for sale in 2018. On April 28, 2018, a 60-page report by the commissioner found out that Brown breached the Member's Integrity Act four times over matters involving his personal finances, but there was insufficient evidence to find him in breach over alleged travel violations.

Brown withdrew his candidacy for party leadership on February 26, 2018, citing the difficulties of simultaneously running for leader while fighting against allegations against him. His withdrawal came days after the revelation that the integrity commissioner was investigating Brown for alleged financial improprieties and several hours after a report revealing his apparent interference, while he was leader, in a Tory candidate nomination that is then being investigated by Hamilton Police for fraud. Brown's supporters cited harassment against members of his family as one cause of his decision to withdraw. Brown's $100,000 registration fee was not refunded by the party.

After the election of Doug Ford as the new leader, there were rumors that Brown would not be allowed to run under their banner.

==== Departure from provincial politics ====
The Progressive Conservative Party's nomination committee unanimously ruled on March 15, 2018, that Patrick Brown would not be eligible to run as a PC candidate in Barrie—Springwater—Oro-Medonte for the June 7, 2018 election. Brown announced on Twitter shortly afterward that he would not run as an independent candidate in Barrie—Springwater—Oro-Medonte. It was later reported by the National Post that a Snover Dhillon, a convicted fraudster banned by the federal Conservatives, played a role in all those nomination irregularities. Following his departure from provincial politics, Brown restarted his law practice and accepted a job as vice-president of a telecommunications company in Vaughan.

== Mayor of Brampton (2018–present) ==
=== Campaigns ===
According to reports by the National Post Brown was "urged" by supporters to run for Chair of the Regional Municipality of Peel in the 2018 Peel Region municipal elections, the first in which the position is directly elected. Brown registered his candidacy for regional chair on July 3, 2018. On July 27, 2018, Brown registered his candidacy for the Brampton mayoral election following Premier Doug Ford's announcement that regional chair elections in Peel Region would be cancelled. Incumbent Brampton mayor Linda Jeffrey suggested "that Brown jumped into the race, and city, at the last minute in a bid to 'rehabilitate' his career", while Brown suggested that Jeffrey's "lack of leadership has contributed to rising property taxes and shootings" in the city.

Brown's platform includes a "poverty action plan" that would require a minimum percentage of new housing to meet affordable standards, and rental properties being redeveloped to include equal amounts of rental spots before and after the process. His "Public Safety Initiative" would include more front line police officers, strengthening the mental health program, and affordable recreation for youth.

Brown defeated incumbent Linda Jeffrey by a narrow margin on October 22, 2018. In his acceptance speech, he thanked former Ontario premier Bill Davis for his endorsement and said, "I’ve got so much hope in my heart for what’s ahead for Brampton. You know why? I know we can turn this around, I know Brampton is going to be back, Brampton is going to become an economic engine". According to the Toronto Star, Jeffrey had the backing of "PC party operatives — Doug Ford’s campaign manager organized a fundraiser for her".

Brown was re-elected as mayor of Brampton in 2022, defeating Nikki Kaur and Bob Singh by a wide margin. On May 1, 2026, he declared his intention to seek a third term in office. He was subsequently re-elected by a wide margin.

=== Fair Deal for Brampton Campaign ===
In June 2019, Brown and Brampton City Council launched a public pressure campaign demanding greater healthcare funding from the provincial government. In this campaign, city council asked citizens of Brampton to sign a petition and share their healthcare stories with the #FairDealforBrampton hashtag. In a media release, the City of Brampton highlighted that residents receive $1,000 less in healthcare funding per person than the provincial average, that there are 55 per cent fewer hospital beds than other Ontario municipalities, and there are unmatched increases in funding compared to the exponential growth of Brampton each year.

The three demands of the provincial government highlighted by city council within the Fair Deal for Brampton campaign included: immediate funding to Brampton Civic Hospital and Peel Memorial Centre to support the increasing demand from the community, arranging fund for the completion of Phase 2 at the Peel Memorial Centre and constructing a new healthcare facility for Brampton to meet the needs of the growing population.

On January 22, 2020, Brampton City Council declared a unanimous healthcare emergency for the City of Brampton. With data from William Osler Health System indicating a hospital occupancy rate consistently over 100 per cent over 2019. The motion called on the provincial government to provide funding for Brampton Civic Hospital and Peel Memorial Centre and to assist in moving ahead with the Phase 2 expansion of 850 beds at Peel Memorial Centre.

On January 24, 2020, the provincial government committed to the funding of a new hospital in Brampton. In a statement to the Brampton Guardian, Brown said “I recognize the fact that the crisis we’re in wasn’t created in a year. That this has been a crisis that has emerged over the last 15 to 20 years and the fact that we’re at the table talking to the premier directly about it when only two days ago we had our physicians and patients come forward with a plea for help.”

==== Hockey Night in Brampton ====
In August 2019, Brown held the first ever Hockey Night in Brampton aimed at fundraising for Brampton Civic Hospital and Osler Health Centre. In total, the game raised $411,000, with proceeds contributing directly to the Cardiology Program at Brampton Civic Hospital. The game saw participation from NHLers, Jason Spezza, Sean Monahan, Malcolm Subban, Connor Brown, Casey Cizikas and personalities such as Nav Bhatia.

In August 2023, the second edition of Hockey Night in Brampton will be held at the CAA Centre to support Brampton's second hospital.

== 2022 federal Conservative leadership campaign ==
On March 13, 2022, Brown announced his candidacy for the Conservative Party of Canada leadership. On July 5, 2022, Brown was disqualified from the race by the party's Leadership Election Organizing Committee (LEOC).

In a statement, Ian Brodie, the chair of the committee, said that the disqualification was recommended by the party's chief returning officer after receiving information on alleged violations of the financial provisions of the Canada Elections Act by Brown's campaign from a former campaign volunteer. After the race, the Toronto Star later revealed that the volunteer legal fees were paid by the campaign of fellow rival leadership rival and winner Pierre Poilievre. Brown described the move as "dirty" but still supported the party.

After the 2024 National Security and Intelligence Committee of Parliamentarians report indicating that there was foreign interference in the Conservative leadership race, the Toronto Star revealed that Brown was probably negatively impacted by it. It was first revealed that the Indian Consulate, who opposed Brown’s candidacy, interfered in the race by pressuring a Conservative MP not to endorse him. The outlet also revealed Poilievre is believed to have benefited from the Sri Lankan government, who also opposed Brown. In addition, Radio Canada reported in late 2024 that Brown was a victim of interference by the Government of India to derail his campaign.

== Political positions ==
Brown identifies himself as a "pragmatic conservative", and after becoming leader he tried to move the Ontario PC Party in a socially libertarian and fiscally conservative direction. Brown's maintaining of the party as centre-right surprised some political commentators who expected a socially conservative shift. As a federal MP, Brown had been one of the more socially conservative members of the Conservative caucus. His critics called him "policy-lite" since he made no policy statements during the Progressive Conservative leadership campaign. Among his political mentors, Brown lists former Ontario Premier Bill Davis, former Quebec Premier Jean Charest and former Canadian Prime Minister Brian Mulroney.

During his tenure as Ontario PC leader, Brown was noted for his close relationship with many of Ontario's diverse ethnic communities. He spoke in the Legislature in support of a motion condemning Islamophobia.

=== Economic policies ===
After winning the leadership race, he focused his plan on four main issues which he suggested would lead to a more prosperous province: less red tape, improved transportation corridors, affordable energy, and addressing Ontario's growing skills gap. Much of Brown's time at Queen's Park was spent criticizing and debating the government's energy policies. He promised to dismantle the Green Energy Act, rein in executive salaries at Hydro One, and place a moratorium on the signing of new energy contracts.

Patrick Brown's first private member's bill in the Ontario Legislature was Bill 136, the Estate Administration Tax Abolition Act, which was an attempt to eliminate Ontario's estate administration (probate) tax (originally introduced by the PC government of Mike Harris in 1998). The bill was supported by Brown's fellow PCs but opposed by the governing Liberals and third party New Democrats, and was voted down 51-24 on division at second reading.

=== Social policies ===
As an MP, Brown voted to re-open the same-sex marriage and abortion debates, and also voted against legalizing euthanasia and including gender expression in the Canadian Human Rights Act. He later said those votes were to represent his constituents. Brown said that he didn't intend to revisit any of these issues in the provincial legislature. As a candidate in the 2022 Conservative leadership election, he reiterated his pro-choice stance though he also stated he thinks abortions should be rare and wants to encourage alternatives to abortion.

In June 2015, Brown expressed his intent to participate in the Toronto Pride parade. His decision to do so marked the first time a PC leader has ever officially marched in the major Toronto Pride parade event and signified an incremental evolution of the provincial party's history with the LGBTQ+ community. In the email to his caucus, Brown said, “If there is anyone in your riding that you want me to call who may not support my decision, I am happy to call them personally.” Brown marched alongside the advocacy group LGBTory in the parade, a group that he has consulted with on several occasions, including when the Ontario Liberal government introduced LGBT-inclusive sex-ed curriculum changes in 2015.

In an interview with the Canadian Press, Brown stated, “Any policy that attempts to limit a woman’s right to choose or the ability of same-sex couples to marry are off limits, period.” In addressing the prospect of losing members of the party because of this more affirmative tone for the Ontario PCs, Brown said, “Frankly, I think I opened the party up to tens of thousands more who simply want a reasonable, thoughtful, modern, inclusive PC party,” so I'm not worried about a few leaving.”

As Mayor of Brampton in June of 2019, Brown wrote an op-ed in the Toronto Star discussing the historical and political importance of the Toronto’s Pride Parade and called on provincial and federal conservative leaders including Doug Ford and Andrew Scheer to officially march in the Toronto and Ottawa parades. In 2019, Brown and Brampton City Council marched in the Toronto Pride Parade as an official delegation for the first time in the city’s history.

==== Quebec Bill 21 opposition ====
In June 2019, Brown and Brampton City Council passed a unanimous motion to support a legal challenge to Quebec's Bill 21, a secularism based law that would make it illegal for government employees in positions of authority (public school teachers, police officers, judges, etc.) to wear religious symbols at their place of employment. Brampton has one of the largest South Asian populations in Canada, one of the populations that this bill would specifically impact. In explaining the justification for passing this motion as a municipality outside of Quebec, Brown stated, “Brampton is Canada’s most diverse big city. And if Brampton's not going to defend Canadian multiculturalism, then who is?" Brown also invited other municipalities to replicate the City of Brampton's motion and join the legal challenge. In addition to joining the legal challenge, Brown also seconded a motion at the Peel Police Services Board to direct Peel police to “place select advertising within Quebec promoting a career at the Peel Regional Police.” The motion stood to recruit and provide opportunities for Quebecers who would be negatively impacted by the law.

=== Foreign affairs ===
==== India ====
Brown has a personal relationship with Indian Prime Minister Narendra Modi, who refers to him as "Patrick Bhai" ("Brother Patrick") and named him an honorary citizen of Gujarat. In 2024, after he became mayor, it was revealed that their relationship broke down over the perception that Brown aligned with separatists from the Sikh community after he became mayor. It also revealed that Brown's criticism of India’s Citizenship Act as Islamophobic in 2020 also contributed to the end of their relationship due to the Hindu far-right and the Indian Consulate in Canada taken an issue to Brown's comments.

On January 22, 2024, Brown initially planned to issue a proclamation for opening Ayodhya Ram Mandir, a temple built on the site of the destroyed Mosque Babri Masji. The proclamation was later scrapped after a group called Justice For All Canada, who received support from Christians, Dalits, Muslims, and secular Indians, raised concerns about their beliefs that it would indicate further importation of bigotry into Canada and the growing influence of Hindutva across the world.

==== Sri Lanka ====
Brown is a critic of the Sri Lankan Government, particularly of its treatment of Sri Lankan Tamils during the final stages of the civil war in that country. He was one of the first Canadian politicians to label the atrocities faced by Tamil civilians in Sri Lanka a genocide. Brown was an advocate of Bill 104, which officially declared the Sri Lankan government's actions a genocide.

In January 2021, following the demolition of a Mullivaikkal monument at Jaffna University by university authorities, he vowed to build a similar monument in Brampton. In November 2021, Brown commemorated Maaveerar Naal on behalf of the city. In a video privately shared to members of the Tamil Canadian community, he stated that if he became Prime Minister, he would lift the Canadian terrorist designation of the Liberation Tigers of Tamil Eelam (LTTE) and apologize for its listing, arguing that the LTTE's actions were "acts of self-defence against a Sri Lankan government that was acting in a manner that was a modern atrocity" and that "rather than it being a symbol of terrorism, the tiger is a symbol of, in my opinion, self-defence against the government committing war crimes." He also argued that "[t]oo many Tamil Canadians continue to be stigmatized due to this ban" and that the ban is "unduly affecting family reunification and professional opportunities."

=== Environment ===
At his first Ontario PC Convention as the new leader, Brown confirmed his belief in man-made climate change and announced his support for a revenue-neutral price on carbon.

== Personal life ==
Brown's wife, Genevieve Gualtieri, is the niece of current Progressive Conservative MPP Rudy Cuzzetto who represents Mississauga—Lakeshore. Genevieve's mother, Silvia Gualtieri, is the Progressive Conservative MPP for Mississauga East—Cooksville. They lived in the Lorne Park neighbourhood of Mississauga, but simultaneously had a lease in Brampton; they have since moved within the city. In July 2019 the couple announced the birth of their first child, a boy. In 2025, a man was arrested after a death threat was made against Brown and his family.

Brown is the nephew of Joe Tascona, a former Progressive Conservative MPP who represented Barrie—Simcoe—Bradford.

=== Book ===
After his forced resignation, Brown penned a book called Takedown: The Attempted Political Assassination of Patrick Brown. The book was released as scheduled, in October 2018, which happened to be after Brown won the mayoralty of Brampton.

There was negative reaction to the release from the Ontario provincial government of Doug Ford, and from the previous incumbent, Linda Jeffrey.

== Electoral record ==
=== Municipal ===
2022 Brampton mayoral election

Candidate	Vote	%
Patrick Brown (X)	50,652	59.65
Nikki Kaur	21,693	25.55
Bob Singh	7,166	8.44
Tony Moracci	3,775	4.45
Vidya Sagar Gautam	1,398	1.65
Prabh Kaur Mand	235	0.28

2018 Brampton mayoral election

Mayoral Candidate	Vote	%
Patrick Brown	46,894	44.43
Linda Jeffrey (X)	42,993	40.73
Baljit Gosal	5,319	5.04
John Sprovieri	5,028	4.76
Wesley Jackson	2,442	2.31
Vinod Kumar Mahesan	1,905	1.80
Mansoor Ameersulthan	972	0.92

=== Provincial ===
Ontario provincial by-election, September 3, 2015: Simcoe North Resignation of Garfield Dunlop
Party	Candidate	Votes	%	±%	Expenditures
Progressive Conservative	Patrick Brown	21,095	53.68	+9.71	$117,157.00
Liberal	Fred Larsen	9,281	23.62	–8.92	$94,892.00
New Democratic	Elizabeth Van Houtte	6,637	16.89	+1.34	$54,795.23
Green	Valerie Powell	1,791	4.56	–3.40	$183.33
New Reform	James Gault	200	0.51	–	–
People's Political Party	Kevin Clarke	146	0.37	–	–
Libertarian	Darren Roskam	104	0.26	–	–
Pauper	John Turmel	47	0.12	–	–
Total valid votes		39,301	99.57		
Total rejected, unmarked and declined ballots		170	0.43	–1.02	
Turnout		39,471	40.67	–12.65	
Eligible voters		97,048			
Progressive Conservative hold		Swing		+9.32	
Source: Elections Ontario

=== Federal ===
2011 Canadian federal election: Barrie
Party	Candidate	Votes	%	±%	Expenditures
Conservative	Patrick Brown	32,121	56.69	+4.32	$94,892.28
New Democratic	Myrna Clark	11,846	20.91	+8.90	$15,554.25
Liberal	Colin Wilson	9,111	16.08	-7.80	$66,558.48
Green	Erich Jacoby-Hawkins	3,271	5.77	-5.33	$31,306.84
Libertarian	Darren Roskam	150	0.26	-0.23	–
Marxist–Leninist	Christine Nugent	82	0.14	-0.02	–
Canadian Action	Jeff Sakula	77	0.14	–	
Total valid votes/Expense limit		56,651	100.00	–	$96,630.18
Total rejected ballots		174	0.31	–	
Turnout		56,825	60.70	–	–
Conservative hold		Swing		-2.29	
Source(s) "Elections Canada Candidate Campaign Returns". Elections Canada Candidate Campaign Returns. Elections Canada.

2008 Canadian federal election: Barrie
Party	Candidate	Votes	%	±%	Expenditures
Conservative	Patrick Brown	27,927	52.37	+10.5	$91,512
Liberal	Rick Jones	12,732	23.88	-15.3	$80,023
New Democratic	Myrna Clark	6,403	12.01	-0.2	$16,038
Green	Erich Jacoby-Hawkins	5,921	11.10	+4.3	$58,204
Libertarian	Paolo Fabrizio	260	0.49	N/A	$171
Marxist–Leninist	Christine Anne Nugent	84	0.16	N/A	$0
Total valid votes/Expense limit		53,327	100	$92,671	

2006 Canadian federal election: Barrie
Party	Candidate	Votes	%	±%	Expenditures
Conservative	Patrick Brown	23,999	41.88	+1.8	$81,530
Liberal	Aileen Carroll	22,476	39.18	-3.5	$69,313
New Democratic	Peter Bursztyn	6,984	12.18	+1.5	$14,496
Green	Erich Jacoby-Hawkins	3,874	6.76	+0.2	$19,036

2004 Canadian federal election: Barrie
Party	Candidate	Votes	%
Liberal	Aileen Carroll	21,233	42.7
Conservative	Patrick Brown	19,938	40.1
New Democratic	Peter Bursztyn	5,312	10.7
Green	Erich Jacoby-Hawkins	3,288	6.6

Party political offices
Preceded by Tasha Kheiriddin	President; Progressive Conservative Youth Federation; 1998 – 2002	Succeeded by Keith Marlowe
