= William Archer (Toronto politician) =

Canadian politician and lawyer (1919–2005)

William Lee Archer, QC (1919–2005) was a Toronto politician and lawyer.

Archer was born in Hamilton, Ontario, to William L. Archer, an Anglican minister, and Caroline MacGregor. After the death of his father the family moved to Toronto, where William found work at the age of 15 as an office boy before moving to the Imperial Bank of Canada, where he was a junior from 1937 until 1940, when he joined the Royal Canadian Naval Volunteer Reserve. He became a sub-lieutenant in 1942 and retired as a lieutenant-commander at the end of World War II.

He attended McGill University following the war and then studied law at Osgoode Hall Law School. He was called to be bar in 1953, became Queen's Counsel in 1962.

In politics, Archer was active with the Progressive Conservative Party of Canada on the Ontario Progressive Conservative Party and served as president of the national Progressive Conservative Youth Federation from 1947 to 1948.

He was first elected to Toronto City Council for Ward 3 in 1958 and, as senior alderman for the ward, served on Metro Council as well. In 1963 he was appointed to the Toronto Board of Control to fill the vacancy created by Donald Summerville's death. He was elected to the Board in his own right in the 1964 election.

Archer ran for Mayor of Toronto in 1966 but was defeated by William Dennison. In 1969, he returned to City Council as alderman for Ward 5. He was elected Ward 6 alderman in 1972 but was defeated in the 1974 election.

In 1975, the provincial government appointed Archer chair of the Niagara Region Study Review Commission. He later served on the Toronto Historical Board and, in 1997, received the Toronto Award of Merit.
