= Progressive Conservative Youth Federation =

Circa 1984. Merger of 'Youth' with PC logo

The Progressive Conservative Youth Federation (PCYF) was the constitutionally enshrined youth body of the Progressive Conservative Party of Canada. When the PC Party and the Canadian Alliance merged in 2004, a formalized youth group was rejected by delegates at the founding convention of the Conservative Party in Montréal by a vote of 51% to 49%. As a result of that vote, PCYF ceased to exist.

== History ==
Circa 1956. Logo of the Young PC Association

PCYF had operated in various capacities for more than 60 years. Its genesis arose from two unique sources – campus politics and riding politics. In a time when few Canadians went to university,, a young Progressive Conservative was any person under the age of 35. The president of the early Young Conservatives was often a successful person in their 30s - a Member of Parliament or senior political staffer.

Conservative campus politics can be traced back to the University of Toronto campus club in 1926. However, the national Progressive Conservative Student Federation was not created until 1946. Campus politics gained importance in the 1950s and played a key role in the rise to power of John Diefenbaker and his eventual overthrow (through a Leadership review). Former Canadian Prime Minister Joe Clark got his political start as a "Youth for Diefenbaker". Today, campus clubs are a way of organizing and involving students in the party, but in the 1950s, campus politics were a venue for the political parties to control student politics.

In the 1960s, the two national youth organizations that had served the party for decades merged into one group. The federation of campus clubs (Progressive Conservative Student Federation) and the non-University, riding-based youth group (Young Progressive Conservative Association) merged to create the Progressive Conservative Youth Federation. PCYF was then sanctioned as the PC Party's official youth wing.

As in many political parties, youth members could vote at national conventions that pick leaders and establish policy. In the Progressive Conservative Party, they accounted for 1/3 of all elected delegates, giving youth a significant influence on the direction the party took. This incorporated a democratic counterweight to established party hierarchy, manifesting itself dramatically in grassroots conventions that elected (and eventually removed) John Diefenbaker, Brian Mulroney, and Kim Campbell.

Many prominent Tories got their start in the youth wing, including: Brian Mulroney, Joe Clark and Jean Charest.

== Structure ==
The PCYF was headed by a national executive, which was elected at a General meeting held every 2–3 years. The executive consisted of:

- President
- VP Anglophone
- VP Francophone
- Finance Director
- Policy Director
- Campus Director
- Organization Director/Membership Director
- Communications Director
- Recruitment Director

In the early years of the organization, a youth member was described as someone under the age of 35. As a result of amendments to the PC Party constitution at the Winnipeg convention in 1996, the age range was reduced so as to only include members between the ages of 14 and 25.

== Finances ==
The organization was primarily funded through an annual grant from the PC Party of Canada. However, the grant was not a preset amount and varied wildly based on the current fortunes of the national party.

PCYF was allowed to raise its own funds, but these efforts were often crippled by a lack of experience from those involved, competing efforts from the central party, or competition from youth raising funds for the next general meeting.

== Controversy ==
The PCYF was a leader in sentiment to merge the PC Party of Canada with the Reform Party of Canada and its successor, the Canadian Alliance. At the Winnipeg convention in 1996, PCYF President Tasha Kheiriddin circulated the 'Tory Top Ten', a list of policies which included a 10% personal income tax cut. The PCYF were successful in having this measure adopted by the party, thus making it the first federal political party to call for income tax cuts.

In the 1998 PCYF elections, future MP Patrick Brown, who then was then only 19 years old, was elected PCYF president in a hotly contested race. Brown won the presidential election based on heavy support from Alberta, Ontario and Quebec. Also elected were Adam Daifallah and Jasmine Igneski. Both Daifallah and Igneski made a well-publicized defection to the Canadian Alliance during the 1999 PC Party National Meeting in Toronto. Daifallah would later become a well-known author and Jasmine Igneski a member of Prime Minister Harper's office.

Patrick Brown caused considerable controversy as PCYF president in 1999 when he pushed for the merger of the right wing movement despite the objection of Tory leader Joe Clark. This move eventually led to PCYF aggressively pushing a united right during the tenure of Brown's presidency. Brown faced considerable opposition from some members of the senior party who were hostile to a united right. Brown campaigned on TV along with Adam Daifallah for the united right. These activities were consistent with a long history of PCYF activism that made lasting contributions to Canada's political democracy, including the removal of John Diefenbaker by Dalton Camp, the adoption of Leadership review as a process to enshrine accountability, the leadership selection of Brian Mulroney and Kim Campbell.

== Presidents ==
- 1945 S.E. (Ned) Stewart - Young Progressive Conservative Association
- 1947-1948 W.L. (Bill) Archer - Progressive Conservative Student Federation
- 1949-1950 Ian Campbell - Progressive Conservative Student Federation
- 1958 Peter McDermald - Progressive Conservative Student Federation
- 1963-1964 Neil Stanley Crawford - Young Progressive Conservative Association
- 1964-1966 Joe Clark - Progressive Conservative Student Federation
- 1971-1973 Len Domino
- 1977 John Aimers
- 1979 Mark Stein
- 1980 David Small
- 1981 Greg Thomas
- 1983 Randy Dawson
- 1988 Irene Porter
- 1993 Marc Arsenault
- 1995-1998 Tasha Kheiriddin
- 1998-2002 Patrick Brown
- 2002-2003 Keith Marlowe (last)
