= Rudy Cuzzetto =

Canadian politician

Rudy Cuzzetto MPP
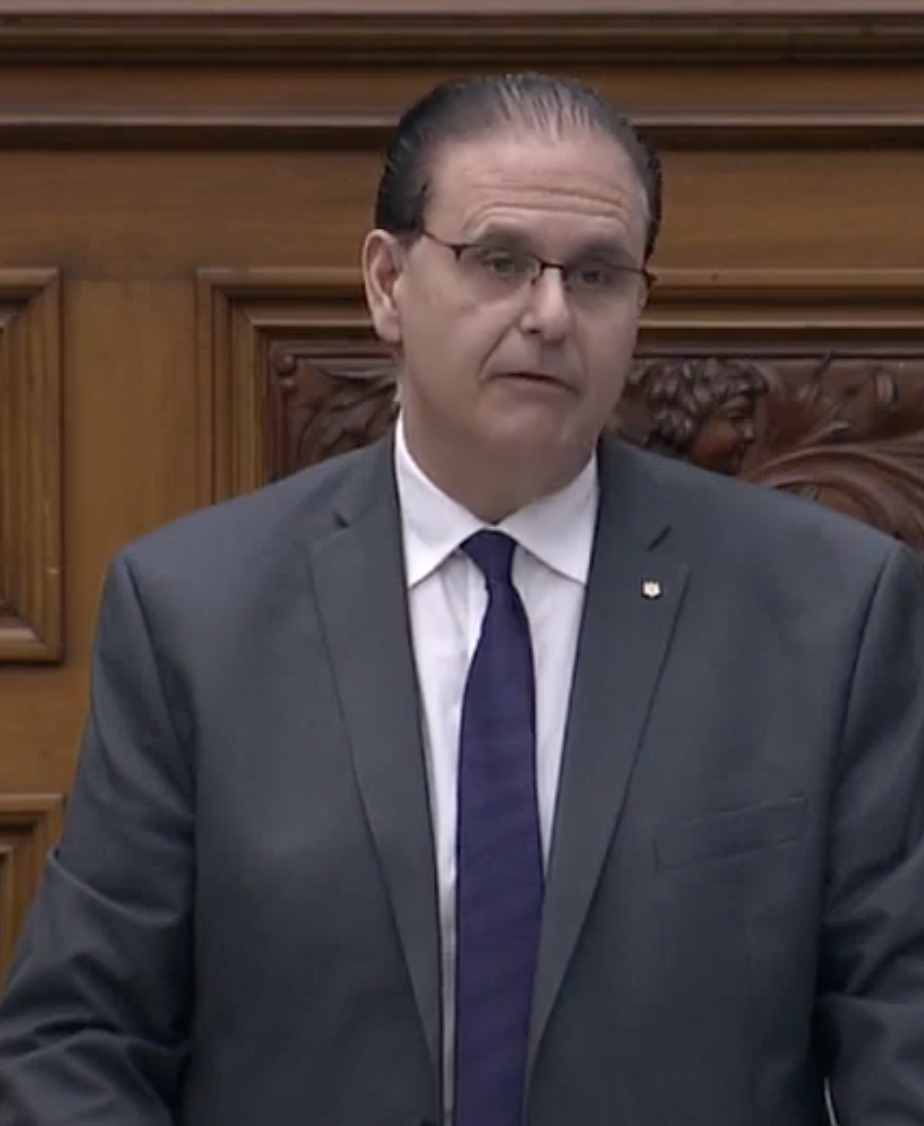

Parliamentary Assistant to the President of the Treasury Board (Internal Audit)
- Incumbent
- Assumed office June 26, 2019
- President: Peter Bethlenfalvy

Member of the Ontario Provincial Parliament for Mississauga—Lakeshore
- Incumbent
- Assumed office June 7, 2018
- Preceded by: Charles Sousa

Personal details
- Born: Port Credit
- Party: Progressive Conservative
- Spouse: Marie Cuzzetto
- Children: 2
- Occupation: auditor

Rudy Cuzzetto is a Canadian politician, who was elected to the Legislative Assembly of Ontario in the 2018 provincial election. He represents the riding of Mississauga—Lakeshore as a member of the Progressive Conservative Party of Ontario.

Rudy is the brother of Silvia Gualtieri, MPP for Mississauga East—Cooksville. She won against Ontario Liberal Party leader Bonnie Crombie in the 2025 Ontario general election. He is also uncle of Silvia's daughter, Genevieve Gualtieri, who is married to Patrick Brown. Before being elected, Cuzzetto was an auditor at Ford Motor for 31 years.

Currently, he is a Member of the Standing Committee on Estimates, Member, Standing Committee on Public Accounts and the interim Parliamentary Assistant to the President of the Treasury Board (Internal Audit).

== Election results ==
2025 Ontario general election
Party	Candidate	Votes	%	±%
Progressive Conservative	Rudy Cuzzetto	20,586	47.54	+2.45
Liberal	Elizabeth Mendes	18,915	43.68	+6.92
New Democratic	Spencer Ki	1,974	4.56	–3.94
Green	Julia Budahazy	1,041	2.40	–2.64
New Blue	Renata Cynarska	549	1.27	–1.09
Independent	Ayoub Bumbia	123	0.28	N/A
Moderate	Oleksii Avdeiev	113	0.26	N/A
Total valid votes/expense limit		43,301	99.47	–0.07
Total rejected, unmarked, and declined ballots		229	0.53	+0.07
Turnout		43,530	46.13	–0.82
Eligible voters		94,358		
Progressive Conservative hold		Swing		–2.31
Source: Elections Ontario

2022 Ontario general election: Mississauga—Lakeshore
Party	Candidate	Votes	%	±%
Progressive Conservative	Rudy Cuzzetto	19,341	45.09	+2.76
Liberal	Elizabeth Mendes	15,768	36.76	+1.73
New Democratic	Julia Kole	3,647	8.50	–9.80
Green	David Zeni	2,160	5.04	+2.08
New Blue	Renata Cynarska	1,014	2.36	–
Ontario Party	George Cescon	501	1.17	–
None of the Above	Brian Crombie	459	1.07	+0.39
Total valid votes		42,890	99.54	
Total rejected, unmarked and declined ballots		197	0.46	–0.43
Turnout		43,087	46.95	–12.38
Eligible voters		91,778		
Progressive Conservative hold		Swing		+0.51
Source: Elections Ontario

2018 Ontario general election: Mississauga—Lakeshore
Party	Candidate	Votes	%	±%
Progressive Conservative	Rudy Cuzzetto	22,520	42.33	+8.88
Liberal	Charles Sousa	18,636	35.03	–15.45
New Democratic	Boris Rosolak	9,735	18.30	+7.62
Green	Lloyd Jones	1,572	2.95	–0.24
None of the Above	Kenny Robinson	363	0.68	–
Libertarian	Jay Ward	223	0.42	–
Go Vegan	Felicia Trigiani	150	0.28	–
Total valid votes		53,199	99.12	
Total rejected, unmarked and declined ballots		474	0.88	
Turnout		53,673	59.33	
Eligible voters		90,469		
Progressive Conservative notional gain from Liberal		Swing		+12.17
Source: Elections Ontario
