= Tasha Kheiriddin =

Canadian political analyst (born 1970)

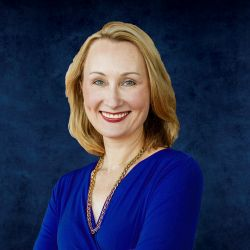
- Born: June 25, 1970 (age 56); Montreal, Quebec, Canada
- Education: McGill University
- Occupations: Policy analyst; pundit; author
- Notable work: The Right Path, Rescuing Canada’s Right: Blueprint for a Conservative Revolution
- Political party: Conservative (2020s); Progressive Conservative (1990s)

Tasha Kheiriddin (born 1970) is a Canadian public affairs commentator, consultant, lawyer, policy analyst and writer.

Kheiriddin is known for her work in journalism, television, and conservative political thought. A graduate of McGill University’s Faculty of Law, Kheiriddin has held prominent roles in Canadian media, including at CBC, CTV, and Global, and has written for the National Post and other publications. She is also a frequent public speaker and political strategist, contributing to discussions on Canadian public policy, conservatism ideology, and women’s issues.

== Early life and education ==
Born on June 25, 1970, Kheiriddin was raised in Montreal by her parents, Fareez Jamil Kheiriddin and Rita Kheiriddin. She grew up in a bilingual household, which later influenced her ease navigating both English and French media in Canada. From an early age, she showed a strong interest in debate, politics, and public speaking.

Kheiriddin attended Collège Jean-de-Brébeuf in Montreal—a well-known preparatory school. She completed an undergraduate degree in political science and economics at McGill University. Following this, she earned her law degree from McGill University in 1993.

== Career ==
Kheiriddin joined the former Progressive Conservative Party of Canada at the age of 14, and served as national President of the Progressive Conservative Youth Federation in her 20’s. She worked in Ottawa for cabinet ministers Barbara McDougall and Bernard Valcourt, and in Montreal for tax and litigation firm Spiegel Sohmer.

After practicing law in Montreal, she moved to Toronto, where she was legislative assistant to the Attorney General of Ontario. Kheiriddin was president of the Progressive Conservative Youth Federation of Canada from 1995 to 1998. She subsequently worked as a television producer at CBC Newsworld and a host and producer on the Cable Public Affairs Channel.

Kheiriddin was the Ontario director for the Canadian Taxpayers Federation for several years before returning to Quebec to join the Montreal Economic Institute, a free-market think tank. She then worked as the director for Quebec in the Montreal office of the Fraser Institute.

From 2011 to 2012, she hosted a Sunday afternoon talk show on Newstalk 1010 and then a business and politics television program, National Affairs, airing weekdays on CTV News Channel. She served on the editorial board for the National Post from 2010 to 2011.

From 2016 to 2019, she hosted The Tasha Kheiriddin Show on CFMJ in Toronto. In 2017, she gave a TED Talk relaying her experiences parenting a daughter with autism.

Kheiriddin was a faculty member at McGill University's Max Bell School of Public Policy and lectured in politics at the university, as recently as 2025. In 2022 she served as co-chair for Jean Charest's bid for the Conservative Party Leadership.

Kheiriddin continues to write political commentary and provide analysis for Canadian news outlets in both English and French.

In 2026, was a candidate for Toronto District School Board trustee in the 2026 Toronto municipal election, placing second.

2026 Toronto District School Board election, Ward 7
Candidate	Votes	%
Deborah Williams (X)	39,410	40.61
Tasha Kheiriddin	21,822	22.49
Adam Golding	15,893	16.38
Nasir Mohammad	6,320	6.51
Gladstone Cherrington	4,842	4.99
Shaffni Nalir	3,665	3.78
Axel Arvizu	2,892	2.98
Theo Nazary	2,203	2.27

== Works ==
In November 2005 she co-wrote Rescuing Canada’s Right: Blueprint for a Conservative Revolution, with journalist Adam Daifallah. In 2022 she published The Right Path: How Conservatives Can Unite, Inspire and Take Canada Forward.

== Recognition ==
The Canadian Bar Association recognized her in 2003 with the Justicia Award for Excellence in Journalism for her television program, Legal Talk.

In 2009, Kheiriddin was recognized by the United States government’s International Visitor Leadership Program, and was awarded a professional exchange with think tanks and media organizations in Washington, D.C., and New York.

In 2012, she was recognized by the Montreal Economic Institute for her contribution to economic education in Canadian media.

In 2016, she was ranked amongst Canada's most powerful women by the W network.

== Personal life ==
She has one daughter and two stepchildren. Her daughter, Zara, is autistic, and Kheiriddin has spoken publicly about her experiences parenting a child with autism, including in a 2017 TEDxKelowna presentation. Kheiriddin has also volunteered with Resources for Exceptional Children and Youth, which supports children and families in Durham Region.
