= 2022 Peel Region municipal elections =

Municipal election in Ontario, Canada

2022 municipal elections in Peel Region
- October 24, 2022

Peel Region municipal elections, 2022 were part of the larger Ontario municipal elections, that took place on Monday, October 24, 2022.

== Brampton ==
=== Mayor ===
2022 Brampton mayoral election
- October 24, 2022
- Turnout: 24.56%
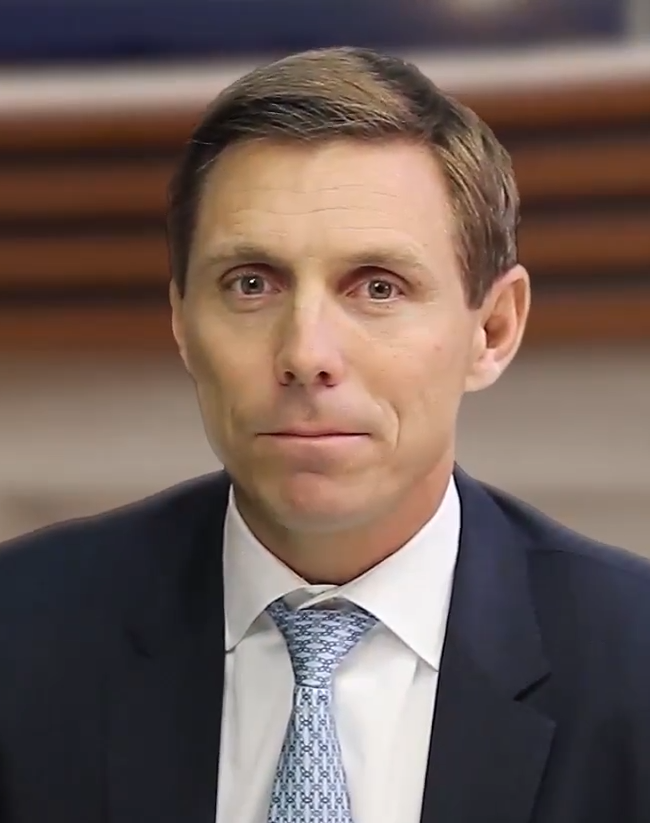
Candidate	Patrick Brown	Nikki Kaur	Bob Singh
Popular vote	50,652	21,693	7,166
Percentage	59.65%	25.55%	8.44%
Mayor before election
Patrick Brown
Elected mayor
Patrick Brown

Patrick Brown was the incumbent, and he won re-election. He won the 2018 election with 44.43% of the vote.

On March 13, 2022, Brown announced he was running for the leadership of the Conservative Party of Canada but was disqualified by the party on July 5.

==== Registered candidates ====
- Patrick Brown (incumbent)
- Vidya Sagar Gautam, 2014 and 2018 Regional council candidate for Wards 1 & 5
- Nikki Kaur, a whistleblower within City of Brampton staff about alleged misconduct by Mayor Patrick Brown and then-CAO David Barrick, campaign to be run by political consultant and strategist Nick Kouvalis. Former Conservative candidate in Hamilton East-Stoney Creek during the 2019 Canadian federal election.
- Prabh Kaur Mand
- Tony Moracci
- Bob Singh, also known as Bob Dosanjh Singh, Punjabi media personality

==== Withdrawn ====
- Jermaine Chambers
- Ramesh Sangha, former Liberal MP for Brampton Centre
- Cody Vatcher, 2018 Regional council candidate for Wards 7 & 8

==== Declined ====
- Martin Medeiros, Regional councillor, Wards 3 & 4
- Ruby Sahota, Liberal MP for Brampton North. A representative told Global News that she was "giving thought to a potential mayoral bid," as of late July 2022; she announced on August 4 that she wouldn't run.

==== Results ====
Candidate	Vote	%
Patrick Brown (X)	50,652	59.65
Nikki Kaur	21,693	25.55
Bob Singh	7,166	8.44
Tony Moracci	3,775	4.45
Vidya Sagar Gautam	1,398	1.65
Prabh Kaur Mand	235	0.28

==== Opinion polls ====
All polls during the election itself were paid for by campaigns: Mainstreet by Brown, Campaign Research by Kaur.

The October 13 poll was paid for by the Kaur campaign, and released the next day. The September 23 poll was paid for by the Brown campaign, and released October 14.

Polling firm	Link	Last date of polling	Sample Size	Margin of error	Patrick Brown	Vidya Gautam	Nikki Kaur	Prabh Kaur Mand	Tony Moracci	Bob Singh	Undecided
Mainstreet	PDF	October 19–21, 2022	398	±4.9%	52	1	17	0	6	3	20
Campaign Research	HTML	October 21, 2022	505	±4%	43	0	44	1	4	8	3
Mainstreet	HTML	October 15, 2022	536	±4%	66	0	17	1	4	8	0
Campaign Research	HTML	October 13, 2022	258	±6	32		32		3	6	25
Mainstreet	HTML	September 23, 2022	587	±4.1	66.1	5.4	10.8		4.1	11	2.7

Polling firm	Link	Last date of polling	Sample Size	Margin of error	Patrick Brown	Gurpreet Dhillon	Martin Medeiros	Elaine Moore	Gurratan Singh	Other	Undecided
Mainstreet	PDF	July 19, 2022	1,054	±3%	41	3	7	5	4	8	33

=== Regional council ===
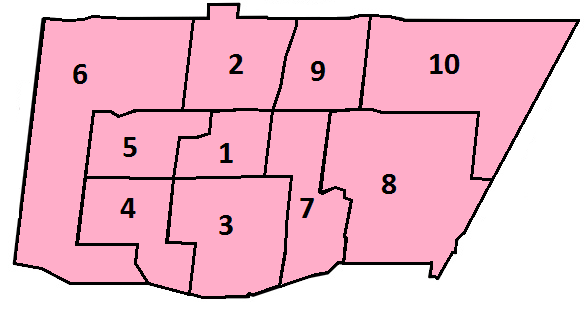
Map of Brampton's wards

These members are elected via double direct election, serving both on Brampton City council and Peel Regional council.

==== Wards 1 & 5 ====
Registered candidates

- Idris Orughu
- Seema Passi, paralegal
- Paul Vicente (incumbent)

Results

Candidate	Vote	%
Paul Vicente (X)	7,832	55.70
Idris Orughu	3,643	25.91
Seema Passi	2,587	18.40

==== Wards 2 & 6 ====
Registered candidates

- Mansoor Ameersulthan, 2018 candidate for Mayor of Brampton
- Babita Gupta
- Azhar Hussain
- Gurpreet Singh Pabla, 2014 candidate for city councillor Wards 2 & 6
- Michael Paul Palleschi (incumbent)
- KebaTamara Thomas

Results

Candidate	Vote	%
Michael Paul Palleschi (X)	9,675	56.59
Gurpreet Singh Pabla	2,095	12.25
Keba Tamara Thomas	1,929	11.28
Azhar Hussain	1,337	7.82
Babita Gupta	1,190	6.96
Mansoor Ameersulthan	871	5.09

==== Wards 3 & 4 ====
The incumbent was Martin Medeiros.

Registered candidates

- Andria Barrett
- Aquin George
- Martin Medeiros (incumbent)
- Ameek Singh
- Raman Vasudev

Ameek Singh Bali was registered and withdrew; it's unclear whether he is Ameek Singh. Raman Vasudev original registered to run as City Councillor, Wards 2 & 6.

Results

Candidate	Vote	%
Martin Medeiros (X)	7,693	53.50
Andria Barrett	2,927	20.35
Ameek Singh	1,951	13.57
Aquin George	1,104	7.68
Raman Vasudev	705	4.90

==== Wards 7 & 8 ====
Registered candidates

- Michael Dancy
- Ripudaman Singh Dhillon
- Pat Fortini (incumbent)
- Matthew Johnson
- Gurinder Sehgal
- Cynthia Sri Pragash, affiliated with unincorporated citizens group BramptonMatters

Results

Candidate	Vote	%
Pat Fortini (X)	6,919	44.50
Ripudaman Singh Dhillon	2,707	17.41
Michael Dancy	2,011	12.93
Matthew Johnson	1,576	10.14
Cynthia Sri Pragash	917	5.90
Farooq Ishaq	825	5.31
Gurinder Sehgal	594	3.82

==== Wards 9 & 10 ====
The incumbent for this ward was Gurpreet Singh Dhillon.

Registered candidates

- Andeep Dhade
- Gurpreet Singh Dhillon (incumbent)
- Azad Singh Goyat
- Susan Joseph
- Gagan Lal
- Mohammad Shoaib
- Gurpartap Singh Toor

Results

Candidate	Vote	%
Gurpartap Singh Toor	6,086	29.39
Gurpreet Singh Dhillon (X)	5,859	28.29
Susan Joseph	3,200	15.45
Gagan Lal	2,498	12.06
Mohammad Shoaib	1,603	7.74
Azad Singh Goyat	1,008	4.87
Andeep Dhade	454	2.19

=== Brampton City Council ===
==== Wards 1 & 5 ====
During the current term of council, Rowena Santos was given the city's additional Regional council position.

Registered candidates

- Stacey Ann Brooks, realtor
- Harshmeet Dhillon
- MD Rafiqul Islam
- Omprakash Kapil
- Steven Lee
- Tracy Pepe, business owner
- Rowena Santos, incumbent

Results

Candidate	Vote	%
Rowena Santos (X)	5,143	36.14
Stacey Ann Brooks	3,092	21.73
Tracy Pepe	1,973	13.86
Harshmeet Dhillon	1,241	8.72
MD. Rafiqul Islam	1,109	7.79
Steven Lee	889	6.25
Omprakash Kapil	784	5.51

==== Wards 2 & 6 ====
The incumbent in the wards was Doug Whillans; he did not run for re-election.

Registered candidates

- Navjit Kaur Brar, respiratory therapist, NDP MPP candidate in 2022
- Jermaine Chambers, financial advisor, Conservative MP candidate in 2021
- Sirajul Islam
- Vijay Mair
- Joe Oreskovic
- Raghav Patel, 2018 candidate for Regional councillor Wards 2 & 6, during which he did not respond to a profile request from The Brampton Guardian
- Hardip Singh
- Cody Vatcher, 2018 candidate for Regional councillor Wards 7 & 8
- Carmen Wilson

Jermaine Chambers was a registered candidate, but withdrew to run for Mayor; he returned to the original nomination in the final week. Carmen Wilson was first registered as a candidate for city council in Wards 7 & 8. Raman Vasudev registered, but later withdrew to run in Wards 3 & 4 for Regional councillor.

Results

Candidate	Vote	%
Navjit Kaur Brar	4,983	28.91
Jermaine Chambers	3,886	22.55
Carmen Wilson	2,658	15.42
Raghav Patel	1,311	7.61
Cody Vatcher	1,217	7.06
Joe Oreskovic	1,005	5.83
Sirajul Islam	853	4.95
Vijay Mair	714	4.14
Hardip Singh	608	3.53

==== Wards 3 & 4 ====
The incumbent in this position was Jeff Bowman. He registered as a candidate, later withdrawing.

Registered candidates

- Cleopatra Gooden-Simms
- Carla Green
- Dennis Kennan
- Jasmohan Singh Mankoo, realtor
- John Sanderson, former Regional councillor for Wards 3 & 4 (2006-2014), 2003 Brampton Business Person of the Year, 2005 Brampton Citizen of the Year
- Tejeshwar Soin, real estate agent

Results

Candidate	Vote	%
Dennis Keenan	4,912	34.13
John Sanderson	4,599	31.96
Carla Green	1,802	12.52
Jasmohan Singh Mankoo	1,442	10.02
Cleopatra Gooden-Simms	1,047	7.28
Tejeshwar Soin	588	4.09

==== Wards 7 & 8 ====
Incumbent Charmaine Williams was elected as the Member of Provincial Parliament for Brampton Centre in the 2022 provincial election, as part of the Progressive Conservative Party of Ontario.

Registered candidates

- Fatima Faruq Ahmad
- Natalie Ballantyne
- Kuljit Singh Batra
- Baljit Bawa, People's Party of Canada candidate in Brampton Centre 2019 and Toronto Centre 2020
- Raymond Carle
- Michael Farquharson
- Damindar Ghumman, 2014 candidate for city councillor Wards 7 & 8
- Rod Power
- Cheryl Rodricks, two-time trustee candidate for the Dufferin-Peel Catholic District School Board in Mississauga, including in 2010, 2011 Mississauga by-election candidate, 2014 candidate for Regional council Brampton Wards 7 & 8, 2018 candidate for Mississauga City Council in Ward 4 by-election
- Jaskaran Sandhu
- Gagan Sandhu
- Cindy-Ann Williams, former executive assistant to Brampton city councillor Charmaine Williams, but unrelated
- Donna Williams, sister of Charmaine Williams

Cleopatra Gooden-Simms registered as a candidate, later withdrawing for City Wards 3, 4. Carmen Wilson registered as a candidate, later withdrawing for City Wards 2, 6. Rod Power registered and withdrew, before re-registering.

Results

Candidate	Vote	%
Rod Power	4,069	26.09
Jaskaran Sandhu	2,849	18.27
Cindy-Ann Williams	2,237	14.34
Donna Williams	1,848	11.85
Fatima Faruq Ahmad	1,021	6.55
Baljit Bawa	689	4.42
Michael Farquharson	586	3.76
Raymond Carle	546	3.50
Cheryl Rodricks	525	3.37
Nataleigh Ballantyne	493	3.16
Gagan Sandhu	315	2.02
Kuljit Singh Batra	258	1.65
Damindar Ghumman	161	1.03

==== Wards 9 & 10 ====
The incumbent was Harkirat Singh.

- Arsalan Baig, 2014 councillor candidate in Etobicoke North
- Janice Gordon-Daniels
- Jagdish Singh Grewal, Canadian Punjabi Post publisher
- Mahendra Gupta, Ward 9 & 10 city council candidate in the 2018 election
- Manpreet Othi, 2019 independent federal candidate in Brampton East
- Harikrat Singh (incumbent)

Results

Candidate	Vote	%
Harikrat Singh (X)	9,076	45.30
Janice Gordon-Daniels	4,577	22.84
Jagdish Singh Grewal	2,316	11.56
Arsalan Baig	1,400	6.99
Mahendra Gupta	1,341	6.69
Manpreet Othi	1,327	6.62

== Caledon ==
Caledon saw 34 people register for municipal office or as school trustee. Six of the nine incumbents were registered as candidates, with Jennifer Innis and Annette Groves going head-to-head for Mayor. As such, only five incumbents were able to be re-elected, guaranteeing at least four new councillors.

The election saw the composition of Caledon council changed, with its four Regional councillors reduced to two, and area councillors increased to six.

In the 2018 election, 32.8% of registered electors in Caledon voted.

=== Mayor ===
Regional council incumbents Jennifer Innis and Annette Groves ran for the position, made empty by the retirement of Allan Thompson.

Registered candidates

- Annette Groves
- Jennifer Innis

==== Results ====
Candidate	Vote	%
Annette Groves	10,270	57.72
Jennifer Innis	7,524	42.28

=== Regional Councillor ===
==== Ward 1, 2, 3 ====
The combined Wards 1, 2, 3 is be the largest geographic area represented by a single Region of Peel councillor, beginning 2022–2026. The incumbent Regional councillors for Ward 1, Ian Sinclair, and Ward 2, Johanna Downey, both decided against running in this election. In the previous term of council, Ward 3 was paired with Ward 4; Wards 3/4 Regional councillor Jennifer Innis is running for Mayor.

Two Regional council incumbents in the former wards will not be standing for re-election. Ian Sinclair represented Caledon Ward 1, while Johanna Downey represented Caledon Ward 2. (Downey had registered May 4, but withdrew June 21.)

Registered candidates for the ward were Christina Early, Ramat Gill, Giacomo Giuliano, and Tom Sweeney. Of them, Early was the incumbent for area councillor ward 2, and worked previously as a senior executive for an independently owned cooperative retail pharmacy. Sweeney is a masonry business owner, and past president of Caledon Lions Club.

Candidate	Vote	%
Christina Early	3,911	42.87
Ramat Gill	2,812	30.83
Tom Sweeney	1,972	21.62
Giacomo Giuliano	427	4.68

==== Ward 4, 5, 6 ====
The councillors for Wards 3/4 and Ward 5, Jennifer Innis and Annette Groves respectively, were both running for Mayor of Caledon. As such, there was no incumbent councillor.

Registered candidates were Anthony Caputo, Frank Di Cosola, Mario Russo, and Manjit Saini. Caputo is a real estate agent, and former president of the Caledon Chamber of Commerce, Di Cosola was the incumbent trustee for Dufferin/Caledon, Dufferin-Peel's Catholic District School Board, and Russo formerly worked for the Ontario Land Tribunal, ran for Regional council in Brampton Wards 1 & 5, 2018, and served as chair of Brampton's Committee of Adjustment for four years

Candidate	Vote	%
Mario Russo	3,365	41.36
Anthony Caputo	2,592	31.86
Frank Di Cosola	1,774	21.80
Bhondhi Manjit Saini	405	4.98

=== Area Councillors ===
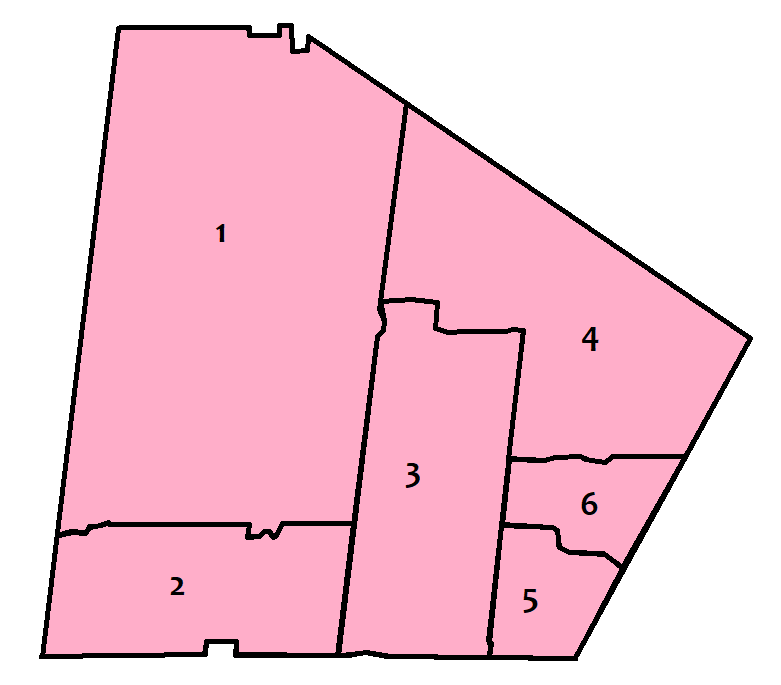
Map of Caledon's six new wards used for the first time in 2022

==== Ward 1 ====
Registered candidates

- Lynn Kiernan (incumbent), retired from investment banking
- Kate Hepworth, president, Caledon Village Association

Candidate	Vote	%
Lynn Kiernan (X)	1,524	51.57
Kate Hepworth	1,431	48.43

==== Ward 2 ====
Incumbent area councillor Christina Early ran for Regional councillor Wards 1, 2, 3, creating an open race in Ward 2.

Registered candidates

- Ramat Gill
- Hunar Kahlon, runs an aggregate trucking company
- John Ruscetta
- Dave Sheen
- Jagraj Sekhon

Candidate	Vote	%
Dave Sheen	1,559	41.03
Jagraj Sekhon	1,100	28.95
Hunar Kahlon	866	22.79
John Ruscetta	275	7.24

==== Ward 3 ====
This ward was previously combined with ward 4. Newly split, there was no incumbent in this ward.

Registered candidates

- Derek Clark
- Arjun McNeill
- Doug Maskell
- Anna Murray, fundraising coordinator

Candidate	Vote	%
Doug Maskell	980	41.33
Derek Clark	737	31.08
Arjun McNeill	433	18.26
Anna Murray	221	9.32

==== Ward 4 ====
The incumbent candidate in this ward was Nick deBoer.

Registered candidates

- Nick deBoer (incumbent)
- Cheryl Connors, executive director of the Canadian Network for Respiratory Care, founder Palgrave Residents Association, 2018 candidate for Caledon Ward 3 & 4

Candidate	Vote	%
Nick deBoer (X)	1,085	52.93
Cheryl Connors	965	47.07

==== Ward 5 ====
The incumbent candidate in this ward was Tony Rosa.

Registered candidates

- Roberto Ricciardi, Bolton Village Residents Association
- Tony Rosa (incumbent)
- Stacie Roberts

Candidate	Vote	%
Tony Rosa (X)	2,414	66.59
Rob Ricciardi	715	19.72
Stacie Roberts	496	13.68

==== Ward 6 ====
Ward 6 was newly created in the wake of ward boundary changes. There was no incumbent.

Registered candidates

- Mary Balinov, Bolton Village Residents Association
- Lucrezia Chiappetta
- Cosimo Napoli
- Angela Panacci

Candidate	Vote	%
Cosimo Napoli	1,131	44.51
Angela Panacci	849	33.41
Lucrezia Chiappetta	368	14.48
Mary Balinov	193	7.60

== Mississauga ==
The election saw one of the highest turnovers in history, with the retirements of Pat Saito and George Carlson, and the resignation of Karen Ras; her appointed replacement, Patricia Mullin, also did not run. Accusations against incumbent Ron Starr led the media to suggest his position is vulnerable.

Voter turnout for the 2018 election was 27%.

=== Mayor ===
2022 Mississauga Mayoral election
- October 24, 2022
- Turnout: 21.84%
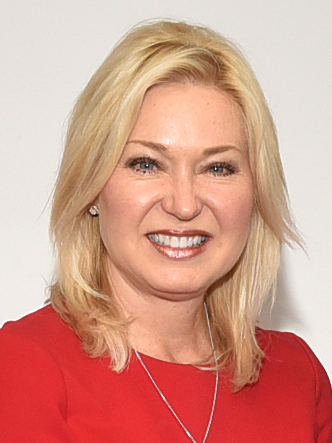
		DS	GT
Candidate	Bonnie Crombie	David Shaw	George Tavares
Popular vote	82,736	7,202	5,613
Percentage	78.47%	6.83%	5.32%
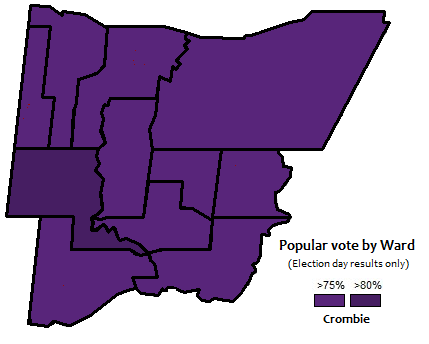
Mayor before election
Bonnie Crombie
Elected mayor
Bonnie Crombie

Bonnie Crombie was the incumbent, and won re-election. She won the 2018 election with 76.68% of the vote. Crombie did not serve the complete term, successfully running in the 2023 leadership election of the Ontario Liberal Party, triggering the 2024 Mississauga mayoral by-election. She subsequently lost the provincial general election, and was removed in a party leadership review.

Candidate	Vote	%
Bonnie Crombie (X)	82,736	78.47
David Shaw	7,202	6.83
George Tavares	5,613	5.32
Derek Ramkissoon	4,012	3.81
Mohsin Khan	2,866	2.72
Melodie J. Petty	1,464	1.39
Jayesh Trivedi	1,169	1.11
Bobie Taffe	370	0.35

=== Council ===
Incumbents Stephen Dasko (Ward 1), Chris Fonseca (Ward 3), John Kovac (Ward 4), Carolyn Parrish (Ward 5), Dipika Damerla (Ward 7), Matt Mahoney (Ward 8), Sue McFadden (Ward 10)

Open seats were Ward 2, won by Alvin Tedjo, Ward 9, won by Martin Reid, and Ward 11, won by Brad Butt.

Joe Horneck won Ward 6 against incumbent Ron Starr, who faced an unsettled investigation into alleged harassment of a fellow councillor.

== Peel District School Board ==
Retired college educator Stan Cameron was acclaimed to his position as Caledon school trustee, having faced no competition for the position.

- Brampton Wards 1, 5: Harparminderjit Singh Gadri, David Green (incumbent), Sophia Jackson, Shajinder Padda, Ali Qamar, Vipul Shah
- Brampton Wards 2, 6: Arun Alex, Yvonne Azaglo, Daniella Balasal, David W. Bosveld, Will Davies (incumbent), Mansoor Mirza, Nicardo Francis, Blair Nitchke, Abdul Raheem, Paula Schulzke, Nirpal Sekhon
- Brampton Wards 3, 4: Guillermo Dacosta Ferrer, Ranjit S. Dhaliwal, Claudio Calvin Lewis, Kathy McDonald (incumbent)
- Brampton Wards 7, 8: Karla Bailey, Pushproop Brar, Michael J. Gyovai, Jamie Peddle, Pardeep Kaur Sanghera, Enver Singh Sumbal, Raheel Yousaf
- Brampton Wards 9, 10: Ravdeep Bassi, Taranvir Dhaliwal, Atif Ejaz, Yadwinder Gossal, Therese Guidolin, Satpaul Singh Johal, Muhammad Idrees Khan, André S. Levy
- Caledon: Stan Cameron (incumbent, acclaimed)
- Mississauga Ward 1, 7: Alexa Barkley, Vijay Bhosekar, LeeAnn Cole, Mohit Hardikar, Areeb Jasper Kohkhar, Lina Pavlovic, Robert Pollard, Shivakumar Sethumadhavan, Paul Skippen, Scott Walker, Melanie Wilson-Nikolov
- Mississauga Ward 2, 8: Shawn Abrahim, Brad Hutchinson, Natalie Kwan, Brad MacDonald (incumbent), Adam Parmentier, Nicole Sutton
- Mississauga Ward 3, 4: Mahmoud Ahmed, Lucas Alves, Jad Ghali, Hameez Iqbal, Bojan Mitrovic, Matt Riggs, Mashkoor Sherwani
- Mississauga Ward 5: Susan Benjamin (incumbent), Avtar Ghotra, Ryan Gurcharn, Ahmad Khan, Van Nguyen, Romana Siddiqui
- Mississauga Ward 6, 11: Glynis D'Souza, Bill McBain, Bijay Paudel, Jill Promoli, Audrey Simpson, Sharon Siriboe
- Mississauga Ward 9, 10: Sabina Alam, Nuhad Ayad, Jeff Clark, Javed Faruqui, Kiran Sawhney

After the election, Mississauga News columnist John Stewart extensively profiled newly elected trustee Jeff Clark.

Alexa Barkley originally registered for trustee Mississauga Ward 2 & 8. Bojan Mitrovic originally registered for Mississauga Ward 6 & 11. Ahmad Khan was originally registered as a city council candidate for Mississauga Ward 5. Erica Allen was registered as candidate for trustee, Brampton Wards 9 & 10. Kelly Ralston was running for Ward 1, 7, but withdrew.

== Dufferin-Peel Catholic District School Board ==
Thomas Thomas was acclaimed to the position, having run unopposed.

- Brampton Wards 1, 3, 4: Dominique Darmanin-Sturgeon, Theresa Laverty, Anisha Thomas
- Brampton Wards 2, 5, 6: Nelson Carepa, Darryl Brian D'Souza (incumbent), Damien Joseph, Ana Solis Alfano
- Brampton Wards 7, 8, 9, 10: Christine Allen, Kathyann Bruney, Roxanne Smith, Marichelle Wilkinson Carle, Shawn Xaviour (incumbent)
- Caledon: Paula Dametto-Giovannozzi, Domenic Maggi, Vince Manzella, Sheralyn Roman
- Mississauga Wards 1, 3: Mary Jo Ferriera, Lorenzo Palermo, Mario Pascucci (incumbent)
- Mississauga Wards 2, 8: Romano Bergic, Ivana Genua, Joanna Maj, Sergio Raez Villanueva, Arnold Rego, Oksana Stech, Magdalena Strecker, Herman Viloria
- Mississauga Wards 4: Stefano Pascucci (incumbent), Mathew Thomas
- Mississauga Wards 5: Thomas Thomas (incumbent)
- Mississauga Wards 6, 11: Luz Del Rosario (incumbent), Tomy Kokkat
- Mississauga Wards 7: Bruno Iannicca (incumbent), Jennifer Mitchell
- Mississauga Wards 9, 10: Charbel Bassil, Brea Corbet (incumbent), Jacob Mathew, Allwyn Sequeira

Dominique Darmanin-Sturgeon registered as a candidate for Brampton Wards 2, 5, 6, before withdrawing and registering for 1, 3, 4.

== Conseil scolaire Viamonde ==
Yvon Rochefort was elected by acclamation, as no one ran against him.

- Peel: Yvon Rochefort

== Conseil scolaire catholique MonAvenir ==
Estelle Ah-Kiow was acclaimed to the position, having run unopposed.

- Brampton and Caledon: Genevieve Grenier, Patrick O'Neil
- Mississauga: Estelle Ah-Kiow
