= Wynne ministry =

Cabinet of Ontario, 2013–18

- 25th ministry of Ontario
- Date formed: February 11, 2013
- Date dissolved: June 29, 2018

People and organizations
- Monarch: Elizabeth II
- Lieutenant Governor: David Onley (2013–2014); Elizabeth Dowdeswell (2014–2018)
- Premier: Kathleen Wynne
- Premier's history: Premiership of Kathleen Wynne
- Deputy Premier: Deb Matthews
- No. of ministers: 28 (at start); 30 (max.)
- Total no. of members: 44
- Member party: Liberal
- Status in legislature: Minority (2013–2014); Majority (2014–2018)
- Opposition party: Progressive Conservative
- Opposition leader: Tim Hudak (2013-2014); Jim Wilson (2014–2015, interim); Patrick Brown (2015–2018); Vic Fedeli (2018, interim)

History
- Incoming formation: 2013 Liberal leadership contest
- Election: 2014
- Outgoing election: 2018
- Legislature terms: 40th Parliament; 41st Parliament
- Predecessor: McGuinty ministry
- Successor: Ford ministry

The Wynne ministry was the cabinet of the Government of Ontario, a province in Canada, from February 11, 2013, to June 29, 2018. It was led by Liberal Premier Kathleen Wynne, the first woman to serve as Premier of Ontario, as well as the first openly gay person to head a ministry in Canada.

Wynne was invited to form a government upon her election two weeks prior as the leader of Ontario's governing party, the Ontario Liberal Party. The Wynne ministry inherited a minority governing mandate from the McGuinty ministry, the province's government from 2003 to 2013, which Wynne (along with many of her ministers) was a part of. Under her leadership, the Ontario Liberal Party won an upset victory in the 2014 Ontario provincial election and regained a parliamentary majority in the 41st Parliament of Ontario. The ministry governed until its electoral defeat in the 2018 election. It was succeeded by the Ford ministry.

== Composition overview ==
A total of forty-four individuals served in the Wynne ministry over its five-year tenure. As the first woman to lead Canada's largest province, Wynne brought eighteen other women into her cabinet. While shy of reaching gender parity, the Wynne ministry surpassed the previous records of number of women in Ontario cabinet (eleven) and proportion of women presence in cabinet (42%), both previously set by the McGuinty ministry in August 2010). Wynne's final cabinet, with thirteen women out of twenty-eight, or 46%, remains the largest number and highest proportion of women in Ontario cabinet to date.

The Wynne ministry was also the first Ontario ministry to substantively reflect the racial and cultural diversity of the province's population. The forty-four members of the ministry included nine were persons of colour (including four women), three members were francophone Canadian, and one openly LGBT person other than the Premier herself. A number of them occupied some of the most prominent roles. She appointed to her inaugural cabinet the first two persons of Muslim faith to serve in Ontario cabinet — Yasir Naqvi, a trade lawyer born in Pakistan (who served as Minister of Labour and later became her Attorney General) and Reza Moridi, a nuclear physicist born in Iran (who served as Minister of Research and Innovation and Minister of Training, Colleges and Universities) — and both served for the full duration of the ministry. She also put two black women, Mitzie Hunter and Indira Naidoo-Harris in charge of Ministry Education, one of the largest and most sensitive provincial portfolio, and a ministry she herself once headed.

Wynne's inaugural cabinet consisted of twenty-seven members including herself, eleven among them served for her entire premiership. Five of them held their portfolios for the entire duration of the ministry:

- Charles Sousa at Ministry of Finance
- Michael Gravelle at Ministry of Northern Development and Mines
- Jeff Leal at Ministry of Rural Affairs (including the term after it merged with Ministry of Agriculture and Food)
- Reza Moridi at Ministry of Research, Innovation and Science
- David Zimmer at Ministry of Indigenous Relations / Aboriginal Affairs.

For a seven-month period between June 2016 and January 2017, Wynne's cabinet consist of thirty members, the largest cabinet since the short-lived Progressive Conservative Miller ministry in 1985 (which had thirty-three members). The number in hindsight appeared rather modest, with her successor Doug Ford leading a cabinet of thirty-seven since 2024.

Wynne first secured her Don Valley West seat in 2003, and was the first out lesbian elected to any legislature in Canada. (Note: NDP MP Libby Davies came out publicly in 2001 but did not face re-election as an out woman until 2004.) She served as parliamentary assistant to two ministers, coincidentally her two strongest leadership rivals in the 2013 leadership contest, before being promoted to the crucial education portfolio by her predecessor Dalton McGuinty in 2006. She had in many occasions highlighted the crucial value of her own time spent on the backbench in preparing her for her ministerial career. During her premiership, no rookie entered cabinet immediately following their election. Three high-profile recruits, former CivicAction head Mitzie Hunter, former NDP MP Glenn Thibeault and former Canadian Civil Liberties Association head Nathalie Des Rosier spent respectively ten, sixteen and fourteen months on the backbench before being elevated into cabinet.

During her five-year premiership, Wynne conducted two major cabinet shuffles. At its inauguration and on these two occasions, all ministers, including those retaining their portfolio, took their oaths of office. The composition of cabinet also saw minor changes on a number of occasions.

Changes to Wynne ministry
Date	Context	Ref	Size	Women
February 11, 2013	Inauguration of Wynne ministry		27	8 (30%)
May 8, 2013	Adjustment upon resignation of Harinder Takhar (for health reasons)		26	8 (31%)
July 2, 2013	Adjustment upon resignation of Laurel Broten (retirement from politics)		25	7 (28%)
March 25, 2014	Adjustment upon resignation of Linda Jeffrey (to seek the mayoralty of Brampton)		26	6 (23%)
June 24, 2014	Major shuffle following majority victory in 2014 election, three ministers no longer in legislature exited, four new ministers promoted including future party leader Steven Del Duca.		27	8 (30%)
June 13, 2016	Major shuffle at halfway point of legislative term, with expressed objectives of renewal and improving diversity and gender balance, four ministers exited, seven new ministers promoted, largest cabinet since the 1980		30	12 (40%)
August 24, 2016	Reassignment of Indira Naidoo-Harris following the agreement on CPP with the federal government		30	12 (40%)
Jan 12, 2017	Adjustment upon resignation of David Orazietti (departure from politics)		29	12 (41%)
July 17, 2017	Adjustment upon resignation of Glen Murray (departure from politics)		29	12 (41%)
January 18, 2018	Pre-election shuffle with three ministers exited (all signaled intention to retire), three new minister promoted		29	13 (45%)
February 26, 2018	Adjustment upon resignation of Eric Hoskins (accepted federal appointment)		28	13 (46%)

=== Formation in February 2013 ===
- Departed (members of McGuinty ministry) (5): Dalton McGuinty (Premier), Chris Bentley (energy), Dwight Duncan (finance), Margarett Best (health promotion), Rick Bartolucci (northern development and mines)
- Re-entered (members of McGuinty ministry) (3): Charles Sousa (finance, management board), Harinder Takhar (government services), Glen Murray (infrastructure, transportation)
- Newly elevated (9): David Zimmer (aboriginal affairs), Teresa Piruzza (children and youth), Tracy MacCharles (consumer services), Liz Sandals (education), Yasir Naqvi (labour), David Orazietti (natural resources), Reza Moridi (research and innovation), Jeff Leal (rural affairs), Mario Sergio (without portfolio responsible for seniors)

Having secured a surprise come-from-behind victory over former cabinet colleague Sandra Pupatello two weeks prior, Kathleen Wynne and her ministry were sworn into office by Lieutenant Governor David Onley on February 11, 2013. The new ministry consisted of twenty-seven cabinet members. Among them seventeen served in the McGuinty ministry, with one member, Jim Bradley, having served in both the McGuinty ministry and the Peterson ministry in the late 1980s.The composition of her new team was influenced by the recent leadership contest in a number of notable ways:

- All ten caucus supporters of Wynne's leadership bid were included in the cabinet. The five incumbent ministers were all given prominent roles - Deb Matthews, Wynne's most trusted confidant in caucus and chair of her come-from-behind leadership bid, was named Deputy Premier while retaining her role running the largest ministry in the government as Minister of Health and Long Term Care. Linda Jeffrey, a loyal ally who urged Wynne to contest the leadership and the first incumbent minister to endorsed her leadership bid, was named chair of cabinet in addition to being promoted to head Wynne's former portfolio of municipal affairs and housing. John Gerretsen, the most senior caucus members among her supporters and a contestant in the 1996 contest, remained Attorney General. Ted McMeekin, one of the most prominent left-leaning voices in caucus with a social justice background, was named Minister of Community and Social Services. Erstwhile rival Glen Murray, who dropped out of race before the convention and campaigned with Wynne in the contest's final two weeks, was given two crucial portfolios with large budget, transportation as well as the infrastructure.
- The five other caucus members who supported her leadership bid were all promoted to cabinet, most prominent among them Liz Sandals, who was named Minister of Education.
- Wynne included in her cabinet all four of her leadership rivals who were in caucus at the time, with significant promotions for the three who backed her on the final ballot. In addition to Murray, Charles Sousa was promoted to be her Minister of Finance. Eric Hoskins, whose dramatic move on the convention floor gave her a major momentum boost was named Minister of Economic Development, Trade and Employment.
- Fulfilling one of her campaign promises, Wynne served as the inaugural agriculture minister for the ministry's first year, sharing the portfolio with newly appointed Minister of Rural Affairs Jeff Leal, who took over the entire portfolio after a year.
- The ministry consisted of a number of minister with extensive ministerial experience. Minister of the Environment Jim Bradley was the most senior member, with over fourteen years of service, spanning the entire durations of the two previous Liberal ministries of Premiers David Peterson (1985–90) and Dalton McGuinty (2003–13). Gerretsen (remained Attorney General), Madeleine Meilleur (remained Minister of Community Safety and Correctional Services), and Takhar (resumed Minister of Government Services) all served for the entire duration of the McGuinty ministry. Wynne retained most of her former cabinet colleagues, and almost all the ministers exited have previously signaled their intention to retire from politics either publicly or internally. The only reported involuntary departure was Margarett Best, who would in turn resign her seat shortly after.
- Wynne promoted into cabinet three backbench supporters of frontrunner Sandra Pupatello, including aforementioned Leal, and also Teresa Piruzza (who was previously Pupatello's aide and local campaign manager), and David Orazietti (who mused of his own bid in the early months of the contest). These moves very likely have made the difference between majority and minority the following year, as it would have been highly unlikely for the Liberals to retain Leal and Orazietti's seats were they not the candidates.

Wynne's frontbench included eight women, including the aforementioned Matthews, Jeffrey, Sandals, Meilleur, Piruzza and Wynne herself; along with holdovers from the McGuinty ministry Laurel Broten; and newly appointed Tracey MacCharles.

Of the 27 cabinet members, John Milloy (as government house leader) and Mario Sergio (as minister responsible for seniors issues) were ministers without portfolio. Milloy soon resumed being a portfolio minister upon the resignation of a colleague three months later. While the new cabinet notionally created two new ministries - Ministry of Rural Affairs being carved out from Ministry of Agriculture, Food and Rural Affairs and the re-creation of the Ministry of Research and Innovation from the Ministry of Economic Development and Innovation, no legislation was passed to execute a formal administrative reorganization. Those ministers were assigned authorities over specific policy area of the actual ministries via orders-in-council. As noted above, the Agriculture & Food portfolio were reunited with Rural Affairs under Leal a year later. The Ministry of Research and Innovation's deputy minister (the top civil servant of the ministry) was a cross appointment of the deputy minister for economic development throughout, and their budget was included in the estimates and supply of the economic development ministry.

=== Early Departures in 2013 ===
- Departed (2): Harinder Takhar (government services, management board), Laurel Broten (intergovernmental affairs)

Two members of cabinet, however, were not long for service. Harinder Takhar resigned from cabinet, but not from the legislature, for health concerns on May 8, yielding his position as Chair of Management Board to Finance Minister Sousa, and his long-held position as Minister of Government Services to Milloy. Laurel Broten resigned her position as Minister of Intergovernmental Affairs and her seat in the legislature in June. Wynne as Premier assumed her intergovernmental affairs portfolio, a routine practice for that portfolio (five of the seven Premiers since the position's creation served as their own Minister of Intergovernmental Affairs), and assigned responsibility for women's issues to Piruzza.

Wynne's minority ministry tabled its first budget on March 21, 2013, with measures that included a $295 million investment into a youth jobs strategy to help tackle the high youth unemployment rate, reducing auto insurance rates by 15 per cent to save motorists $225 a year, $260 million investment to boost home care health services for 46,000 seniors, $45 million investment into an Ontario Music Fund to help Ontario musicians, a $200 per month earnings exemption for those on Ontario Works and Ontario Disability Support Program, $5 million into First Nations education, elimination of the employers health tax exemption for large companies, postponed tax cuts for big businesses, extended the capital cost allowance for machinery and equipment, increased the Ontario Child Benefit from $1,100 to $1,310 per year to support low-income families and other economic measures. PC leader Tim Hudak had earlier said that he would not support the budget regardless of its contents. He said, "the sooner there's a change in government, the better it is to give hope to people in the province who have lost hope." The many social investment included in the budget made it very difficult for the New Democratic Party to reject however. Wynne's ministry survived its first major test of parliamentary confidence on June 11, 2013, with the budget passed by a vote of 64 for and all 36 PC members against.

Wynne's tenuous hold on power suffered a significant setback over the summer. By the time the legislature rose for the summer, five members of the McGuinty ministry has resigned their seat: McGuinty, former finance minister Dwight Duncan, former Attorney General and Energy Minister Chris Bentley, the aforementioned Broten and Best. All five were re-elected in 2011 by reasonably comfortable margin. On August 1, the Liberals lost three of the five by-elections. Incumbent city councillor Peter Milczyn was defeated by Toronto Deputy Mayor Doug Holyday in Broten's Etobicoke—Lakeshore in a competitive fight (but would revenge the loss less than a year later). The Liberal candidates in Bentley's London West and Duncan's Windsor—Tecumseh both faces controversy however, and finished a distant third. The Liberals retained McGuinty's Ottawa South (but with much reduced margin) with John Fraser, a long-time McGuinty aide who would serve multiple stints as interim party leader in opposition years later, and Best's Scarborough—Guildwood with a star recruit, CivicAction's CEO Mitzie Hunter in a tight three-way contest featuring former TTC Chair Adam Giambrone as the NDP candidate. The losses in Windsor and London foreshadowed the total collapse of Liberal support in southwestern Ontario in the subsequent decade. The losses also significantly diminished the Liberals' hopes for flipping the minority for a bare majority.

=== 2014 Pre-Election Shuffle ===
- Departed(1): Linda Jeffrey (municipal affairs and housing)
- Newly elevated (2): Kevin Flynn (labour), Bill Mauro (municipal affairs and housing)

On March 25, Wynne's ally Linda Jeffrey resigned from parliament for a bid to oust Brampton's scandal-plagued mayor. Jeffrey was elected mayor of Brampton later that year. Her resignation triggered a small shuffle impacting a handful of minister. The title Chair of Cabinet was assumed by John Gerretsen, who announced in the previous year announced his intention to not seek re-election and agreed to remain in cabinet as a minister without portfolio until the election. The minor shuffle saw the promotion of two veteran caucus member into cabinet for the first time, and the promotion of two existing ministers. Gerretsen relinquished the prestigious role as Attorney General to long-time cabinet colleague Madeleine Meilleur, who became Ontario first francophone Attorney General. Meilleur's community safety portfolio went to Yasir Naqvi. Naqvi's labour portfolio went to Kevin Flynn, while Jeffrey's municipal affairs and housing portfolio went to Bill Mauro, who served on Thunder Bay City Council for over 15 years before elected MPP. Both new ministers were veterans first elected as part of the class of 2003 with Wynne. With this shuffle cabinet numbered 26 ministers, though the number of women dropped to six.

=== 2014 Post-Election Shuffle ===
- Departed (3): Teresa Piruzza (children and youth), John Milloy (government services) John Gerretsen (without portfolio, chair of cabinet),
- Newly elevated (4): Helena Jaczek (community and social services), Steven Del Duca (transportation), Dipika Damerla (without portfolio, responsible for long-term care) and Mitzie Hunter (without portfolio, for Ontario Retirement Pension Plan)

Following threats by the opposition NDP to vote against a tabled budget, Wynne moved preemptively and sought the legislature's dissolution on May 2, 2014. The 2014 Ontario general election, held on June 12, resulted in a slim 4-seat Liberal majority (58 out of 107 seats). With a renewed mandate, Wynne conducted a major shuffle on June 24 that saw the departure of three ministers who were no longer members of the legislature. Staying true to her stated view of experience as a backbencher being crucial preparation for one's ministerial career, Wynne elevated no rookie caucus members into cabinet. The shuffle ushered in four first time ministers, two of them having won their seats in byelections in the previous parliament.

- Future Liberal Party leader Steven Del Duca, as Minister of Transportation
- Helena Jaczek as Minister of Community and Social Services
- Dipika Damerla and Mitzie Hunter were appointed ministers without portfolio but were styled as "associate ministers". Damerla was named as associate health minister responsible for long-term care and wellness, to assist newly appointed health minister Eric Hoskins, who was tasked to handle spending concerns over Ornge Air and electronic health records. Hunter was made an associate minister of finance minister Charles Sousa for the establishment of the Ontario Retirement Pension Plan.

There were several further instances of re-organisation of ministries. Again, the reassignments of authorities were done through orders-in-council with no enabling legislations or amendments to existing legislations. Some were later undone similarly via revocations of these orders-in-council.

- The most significant reorganization was the re-creation of the Treasury Board Secretariat, to be headed by a minister titled President of the Treasury Board. In a move reversing parts of multiple reorganizations that took place over decades, the central agency known as Management Board Secretariat since 1971 would resume its former name. Deputy Premier Deb Matthews was named the new President of Treasury Board, and was assigned authorities related to the expense control from the finance minister, and public service collective bargaining function from the government service minister, with an explicit mandate to freeze wage increases to combat the deficit.
- A frequent target of political rebranding and turf rivalry, the economic development portfolio was substantially realigned. In a move that can be traced back to multiple precedents, Brad Duguid resumed carriage of two prized portfolios he held over two distinct periods in the McGuinty ministry, economic development and infrastructure, and took the new title Minister of Economic Development, Employment and Infrastructure. Following a 2008 precedent, responsibilities for trade was once again carved out of the economic development portfolio, and was handed to Michael Chan, who also took on the Ministry of Citizenship and Immigration. Neither of these pairing would endure beyond the next shuffle.
- Ministry of Government and Consumer Services was re-established by combining the government services and consumer services ministries, to be helmed by David Orazietti.
- Ministry of Agriculture, Food and Rural Affairs was re-established formally, with rural affairs minister Jeff Leal assuming the entire portfolio.
- Ministry of Environment was renamed "Ministry of Environment and Climate Change" and assigned to Glen Murray with an enhanced mandate to combat the effects of climate change.

Other moves impacting key ministries in the government, some with impact to the Liberals' fortune later:

- Eric Hoskins, who was struggling at economic development, moved to health, the portfolio he as a physician had long coveted.
- Bill Mauro moved to natural resources, and took on the actual title prescribed by the ministry's enabling legislation as "Minister of Natural Resources and Forestry". His briefly held municipal affairs portfolio went to Ted McMeekin, also a former long-time municipal councillor and mayor.
- Reza Moridi was given Training, Colleges and Universities, the portfolio with the third largest operating budget after health and education, in addition to his existing role as Minister of Research and Innovation. While his academic background made him seems suitable the additional role, his patrician style would later prove ill-suited for handling the rough-and-tumble stakeholders of the skill trade files.
- Tracy MacCharles succeeded Piruzza as both Minister Responsible for Women's Issues and Minister of Children and Youth Services, the later role thrusting her soon after into the contentious autism file that became a major pain point for the government

Jim Bradley, who was newly appointed cabinet chair, and Mario Sergio remained in cabinet as ministers without portfolio. The number of women in cabinet rose to eight.

Most members of cabinet were involved in this shuffle or the March 25 shuffle in some way, including high-profile moves involving the aforementioned Duguid, Hoskins, Matthews, Meilleur, and Naqvi. Only Bob Chiarelli (Minister of Energy), Michael Gravelle (Northern Development and Mines), Mario Sergio (Minister without portfolio Responsible for Seniors), and David Zimmer (Minister of Aboriginal Affairs) remained unchanged in their roles.

=== 2016 Midterm Shuffle ===
- Departed: Madeleine Meilleur (Attorney General), Ted McMeekin (municipal affairs & housing), Mario Sergio (without portfolio, for seniors' issues), Jim Bradley (without portfolio, cabinet chair)
- Newly elevated: Laura Albanese (citizenship & immigration), Glenn Thibeault (energy), Marie-France Lalonde (government & consumer services), Chris Ballard (housing), Kathryn McGarry (natural resources), Eleanor McMahon (tourism, culture & sport), Indira Naidoo-Harris (without portfolio, for pension plan)

After two years with no change to her cabinet, Wynne executed a major cabinet shuffle on June 13, 2016, the approximate midpoint till the next election, with the stated objective for injecting new blood and readying for the next election. Given the gender-balance cabinet formed by the federal liberals seven months earlier, she faced pressure to improve the gender balance of her front bench team. These concurrent objectives led to the exit of four veteran ministers, the elevations of seven new ministers including five women, and the largest cabinet in Ontario since 1987.

In a move that made international news, municipal affairs minister Ted McMeekin, considered among the most left-leaning ministers, wrote in a social media post a week prior to the shuffle that he would be resigning, noting, "Sometimes the best way for a man to advance the equality of women may be to step back and make room at the table." This was followed by announcement by seniors' issue minister Mario Sergio and cabinet chair Jim Bradley, a 39-year veteran in the legislature and the only person to have served in cabinet throughout all three liberal ministries of the past 30 years, of their resignations also for the expressed purpose of making room for new blood. All three indicated they will continue to serve as backbench members of the government. In the same week, Attorney General Madeleine Meilleur also announced her resignation not only from cabinet but also from the legislature.

Similar to the major shuffle in 2014, all members of the new cabinet took their oath of offices in a formal ceremony, this time taking place in the main hallway of the legislature instead of inside the legislative chamber. Seven new ministers joined cabinet, including five who were first elected in the 2014 elections - Chris Ballard, Marie-France Lalonde, Kathryn McGarry, Eleanor McMahon, Indira Naidoo-Harris, and Glenn Thibeault, a former NDP who gained a seat for the liberals in a byelection despite an ongoing criminal probe over his nomination (which did not implicate him, but led to a high-profile criminal prosecution against the Liberals campaign chief and Wynne's deputy chief of staff Pat Sorbara and a long time party elder in Thibeault's electoral district), along with Laura Albanese, who was Wynne's Parliamentary Assistant in her first year as Premier.

Key moves and reorganizations included:

- Deputy Premier Deb Matthews assumed the renamed role Minister of Advanced Education and Skills Development, formerly Minister of Training, Colleges and Universities from Reza Moridi, who retained the smaller portfolio of research and innovation, renamed "Ministry of Research, Innovation and Science"
- Mitzie Hunter was given charge of the important education ministry from Liz Sandals, who was widely expected to retire at the next election and took on the critical but much lower profile process role of President of Treasury Board
- Glenn Thibeault, a star recruit who won a by-election the year prior, was given the high profile and highly sensitive role of Minister of Energy
- In another first for the role, Yasir Naqvi assumed the prestigious Attorney General role, the first person of colour in that role, with his community safety portfolio going to David Orazietti
- Reversing the reorganizations in the previous shuffle, economic development and infrastructure were decoupled, with incumbent minister Brad Duguid retaining the portfolio with a new title of Minister of Economic Development and Growth and the Infrastructure portfolio returning to its former minister Bob Chiarelli. Similarly, citizenship & immigration and trade were decoupled, with incumbent minister Michael Chan staying as trade minister, and the Ministry of Citizenship and Immigration going to newcomer Laura Albanese.
- Ministry of Municipal Affairs and Housing was divided, with former minister Bill Mauro resuming charge of municipal affairs and the housing portfolio assigned to newcomer Chris Ballard, who was also named given specific responsibility for poverty reduction."
- Ministry of Aboriginal Affairs was renamed Ministry of Indigenous Relations and Reconciliation, with incumbent minister David Zimmer given an expanded mandate to formulate the government's respond to relevant recommendations released by the Truth and Reconciliation Commission in 2015.
- Having sustained much heat for her handling of the autism file, Tracy MacCharles relinquished her children and youth services portfolio to Michael Coteau, and became a minister without portfolio responsible for women's issues and accessibility issues.

With this shuffle, the number of women increased to twelve, bringing the proportion of women in cabinet to 40%, a new record for the number women in Ontario cabinet at any given time surpassing previous record of eleven set by the McGuinty ministry in August 2010. The record of proportion of women presence to was not surpassed until a later shuffle.

Among those few retaining high-profile portfolios were Steven Del Duca remaining at Ministry of Transportation, Eric Hoskins remaining at Ministry of Health and Long Term Care, and Charles Sousa at Ministry of Finance

Shortly after the shuffle, the role of associate finance minister was rendered redundant by an agreement with federal government on CPP. Incumbent minister Indira Naidoo-Harris was assigned a new role on August 24 as associate education minister with responsibility for early years and child care.

=== January 2017 ===
- Departed: David Orazietti (community safety and correctional service)

On January 12, Wynne reorganised several ministries, mostly on the basis of changes to ministerial responsibilities, with two policy areas being elevated to portfolio status by orders-in-council:

- Ministry of Senior Affairs was created, elevating the policy area and the responsible minister Dipika Damerla) to full portfolio status.
- Ministry of Women's Issues (soon renamed "Ministry of the Status of Women") was created, elevating the Office of Women's Issues and its responsible minister Indira Naidoo-Harris to full portfolio status while also retaining responsibility for early years and child care.
- Responsibilities for small business, part of the economic development portfolio, was assigned to agriculture minister Jeff Leal, to relieve economic development minister Brad Duguid in anticipation of challenges from a newly elected Trump administration that had campaigned on a punitive renegotiation NAFTA.

A few weeks prior, David Orazietti resigned from parliament. His community safety and correctional services portfolio was transferred to Marie-France Lalonde, while Lalonde's government and consumer services was transferred to Tracy MacCharles.

=== July 2017 ===
- Departed: Glen Murray (environment)
- Newly elevated: Peter Milczyn (housing)

On July 31, yet another area of ministerial responsibility was elevated to the status of full ministry:

- Ministry of Francophone Affairs was created and assigned to incumbent Minister Responsible for Francophone Affairs Marie-France Lalonde, who also remained at her post as Minister of Community Safety and Correctional Services.

Glen Murray resigned from parliament this month as well, his environment portfolio went to Chris Ballard, and Ballard's housing portfolio to new minister Peter Milczyn. The number of cabinet members remained unchanged at 29.

=== 2018 Pre-election Reset ===
- Departed: Deb Matthews (advance education), Brad Duguid (economic development), and Liz Sandals (treasury board)
- Newly elevated: Nathalie Des Rosiers (natural resources), Harinder Malhi (status of women), and Daiene Vernile (tourism, culture & sport)

On January 17, three close allies of Wynne who have announced their pending retirement from politics — Brad Duguid, Deb Matthews, and Liz Sandals — left cabinet. They were replaced at their respective ministries by Steven Del Duca at Ministry of Economic Development and Growth, Mitzie Hunter at Ministry of Advanced Education and Skills Development, and Eleanor McMahon as President of Treasury Board. Their vacancies in cabinet were filled by newly appointed cabinet ministers Nathalie Des Rosiers, Harinder Malhi, and Daiene Vernile, the last three ministers to be elevated to cabinet by Wynne. Helena Jaczek further took over as Chair of Cabinet from Matthews, while the position of Deputy Premier went into disuse for the remainder of the ministry.

With this shuffle, the number of cabinet members remained steady at twenty-nine, and the number of women increased to thirteen, or 45%, surpassing the previous record of 42% record set by the McGuinty ministry.

On February 26, the last cabinet change occurred, as Wynne lost a fourth high-profile cabinet minister in the run up to the election with the resignation of Eric Hoskins. He was replaced as Minister of Health and Long Term Care by Helena Jaczek, a former chief medical officer of health of York Region.

==== Election of 2018 ====
The results of the June 7, 2018 Ontario general election were catastrophic for the governing Liberal Party and for Wynne's cabinet alike. Of the 26 cabinet ministers who contested their seats (Michael Chan and Tracy MacCharles ended up not contesting the election), only six were returned, including Wynne herself, Michael Coteau, Nathalie Des Rosiers, Michael Gravelle, Mitzie Hunter, and Marie-France Lalonde, as the party itself only managed a total of seven seats in the 42nd Parliament of Ontario.

== List of ministers ==
=== By seniority ===
Timespan: service in McGuinty ministry (Note: represent last 3 years only) service in Wynne ministry

Minister	Ministerial service			Parliamentary Service		
Minister	Start	End	Timespan	1st	Electoral District	Region
Kathleen Wynne	(Sep 18, 2006); Feb 11, 2013	June 29, 2018		2003	Don Valley West	Toronto
Jim Bradley	(June 26, 1985); Feb 11, 2013	June 13, 2016		1977	St. Catharines	905 West
John Gerretsen	Oct 23, 2003); Feb 11, 2013	June 24, 2014		1995	Kingston and the Islands	East
Madeleine Meilleur	(Oct 23, 2003); Feb 11, 2013	June 13, 2016		2003	Ottawa-Vanier	East-NCR
Harinder Takhar	(Oct 23, 2003); Feb 11, 2013	May 8, 2013		2003	Mississauga Centre	905 West
Laurel Broten	(June 29, 2005); Feb 11, 2013	July 2, 2013		2003	Etobicoke—Lakeshore	Toronto
Michael Chan	(Feb 21, 2007); Feb 11, 2013	June 29, 2018		2006 (Note: By-election)	Markham—Unionville	905 North
Michael Gravelle	(Oct 30, 2007); Feb 11, 2013	June 29, 2018		1995	Thunder Bay—Superior North	North
Ted McMeekin	(Oct 30, 2007); Feb 11, 2013	June 13, 2016		2000	Ancaster—Dundas—Flamborough—Westdale	905 West
Brad Duguid	(Oct 30, 2007); Feb 11, 2013	Jan 17, 2018		2003	Scarborough Centre	Toronto
Deb Matthews	(Oct 30, 2007); Feb 11, 2013	Jan 17, 2018		2003	London North Centre	Southwest
John Milloy	(Oct 30, 2007); Feb 11, 2013	June 24, 2014		2003	Kitchener Centre	SW-Midwest
Linda Jeffrey	(Jan 18, 2010); Feb 11, 2013	March 25, 2014		2003	Brampton—Springdale	905 West
Eric Hoskins	(Jan 18, 2010); Feb 11, 2013	Feb 26, 2018		2009	St. Paul's	Toronto
Bob Chiarelli	(Aug 18, 2010); Feb 11, 2013	June 29, 2018		1987 (Note: non-continuous service, left legislature in 1997 and returned via a by-election in 2010)	Ottawa West–Nepean	East-NCR
Glen Murray	(Aug 18, 2010); Feb 11, 2013	July 31, 2017		2010	Toronto Centre	Toronto
Charles Sousa	(Dec 16, 2010); Feb 11, 2013	June 29, 2018		2007	Mississauga South	905 West
Mario Sergio	Feb 11, 2013	June 13, 2016		1995	York West	Toronto
Jeff Leal	Feb 11, 2013	June 29, 2018		2003	Peterborough	East
David Orazietti	Feb 11, 2013	Dec 16, 2016		2003	Sault Ste. Marie	North
Liz Sandals	Feb 11, 2013	Jan 17, 2018		2003	Guelph	SW-Midwest
David Zimmer	Feb 11, 2013	June 29, 2018		2003	Willowdale	Toronto
Reza Moridi	Feb 11, 2013	June 29, 2018		2007	Richmond Hill	905 North
Yasir Naqvi	Feb 11, 2013	June 29, 2018		2007	Ottawa Centre	East-NCR
Michael Coteau	Feb 11, 2013	June 29, 2018		2011	Don Valley East	Toronto
Tracy MacCharles	Feb 11, 2013	June 29, 2018		2011	Pickering—Scarborough East	905 East
Teresa Piruzza	Feb 11, 2013	June 24, 2014		2011	Windsor West	Southwest
Kevin Flynn	March 25, 2014	June 29, 2018		2003	Oakville	905 West
Bill Mauro	March 25, 2014	June 29, 2018		2003	Thunder Bay—Atikokan	North
Helena Jaczek	June 24, 2014	June 29, 2018		2007	Oak Ridges—Markham	905 North
Dipika Damerla	June 24, 2014	June 29, 2018		2011	Mississauga East—Cooksville	905 West
Steven Del Duca	June 24, 2014	June 29, 2018		2012	Vaughan	905 North
Mitzie Hunter	June 24, 2014	June 29, 2018		2013	Scarborough—Guildwood	Toronto
Laura Albanese	June 13, 2016	June 29, 2018		2007	York South—Weston	Toronto
Chris Ballard	June 13, 2016	June 29, 2018		2014	Newmarket—Aurora	905 North
Marie-France Lalonde	June 13, 2016	June 29, 2018		2014	Orléans	East-NCR
Kathryn McGarry	June 13, 2016	June 29, 2018		2014	Cambridge	SW-Midwest
Eleanor McMahon	June 13, 2016	June 29, 2018		2014	Burlington	905 West
Indira Naidoo-Harris	June 13, 2016	June 29, 2018		2014	Halton	905 West
Glenn Thibeault	June 13, 2016	June 29, 2018		2014	Sudbury	North
Peter Milczyn	July 31, 2017	June 29, 2018		2014	Etobicoke—Lakeshore	Toronto
Harinder Malhi	Jan 17, 2018	June 29, 2018		2014	Brampton—Springdale	905 West
Daiene Vernile	Jan 17, 2018	June 29, 2018		2014	Kitchener Centre	SW-Midwest
Nathalie Des Rosiers	Jan 17, 2018	June 29, 2018		2016	Ottawa—Vanier	East-NCR

=== By portfolio ===
Portfolio minister without portfolio/associate minister	Minister	Tenure	
Portfolio minister without portfolio/associate minister	Minister	Start	End
Central administration & citizenship portfolios
Premier & President of the Council	Kathleen Wynne	Feb 11, 2013	June 29, 2018
Deputy Premier of Ontario	Deb Matthews	Feb 11, 2013	Jan 17, 2018
Deputy Premier of Ontario	title not in use	Jan 17, 2018	June 29, 2018
Minister of Finance	Charles Sousa	Feb 11, 2013	June 29, 2018
Associate Minister of Finance (Ontario Retirement Pension Plan) (Note: New title; responsibility eliminated on July 13, 2016 upon agreement on CPP with the federal government)	Mitzie Hunter	June 24, 2014	July 13, 2016
Associate Minister of Finance (Ontario Retirement Pension Plan)	Indira Naidoo-Harris	July 13, 2016	August 24, 2016
Chair of the Management Board of Cabinet	Harinder Takhar	Feb 11, 2013	May 8, 2013
Chair of the Management Board of Cabinet	Charles Sousa	May 8, 2013	June 24, 2014
President of the Treasury Board	Deb Matthews	June 24, 2014	June 13, 2016
President of the Treasury Board	Liz Sandals	June 13, 2016	Jan 17, 2018
President of the Treasury Board	Eleanor McMahon	Jan 17, 2018	June 29, 2018
Minister of Intergovernmental Affairs	Laurel Broten	Feb 11, 2013	July 2, 2013
Minister of Intergovernmental Affairs	Kathleen Wynne	July 2, 2013	June 29, 2018
Minister of Citizenship and Immigration (Chan was styled as Minister of Citizenship, Immigration and International Trade)	Michael Coteau	Feb 11, 2013	June 24, 2014
Minister of Citizenship and Immigration (Chan was styled as Minister of Citizenship, Immigration and International Trade)	Michael Chan	June 24, 2014	June 13, 2016
Minister of Citizenship and Immigration (Chan was styled as Minister of Citizenship, Immigration and International Trade)	Laura Albanese	June 13, 2016	June 29, 2018
Minister Responsible for Francophone Affairs	Madeleine Meilleur	Feb 11, 2013	June 13, 2016
Minister Responsible for Francophone Affairs	Marie-France Lalonde	June 13, 2016	July 31, 2017
Minister of Francophone Affairs (Note: elevated to status of full ministry July 31, 2017.)	Marie-France Lalonde	July 31, 2017	June 29, 2018
Minister of Aboriginal Affairs (to June 13, 2016); Minister of Indigenous Relations and Reconciliation	David Zimmer	Feb 11, 2013	June 29, 2018
Judiciary and law enforcement portfolios
Attorney General	John Gerretsen	Feb 11, 2013	March 25, 2014
Attorney General	Madeleine Meilleur	March 25, 2014	June 13, 2016
Attorney General	Yasir Naqvi	June 13, 2016	June 29, 2018
Minister of Community Safety and Correctional Services	Madeleine Meilleur	Feb 11, 2013	March 25, 2014
Minister of Community Safety and Correctional Services	Yasir Naqvi	March 25, 2014	June 13, 2016
Minister of Community Safety and Correctional Services	David Orazietti	June 13, 2016	December 16, 2016
Minister of Community Safety and Correctional Services	Kevin Flynn (acting)	December 16, 2016	Jan 12, 2017
Minister of Community Safety and Correctional Services	Marie-France Lalonde	Jan 12, 2017	June 29, 2018
Social & human services portfolios
Minister of Education	Liz Sandals	Feb 11, 2013	June 13, 2016
Minister of Education	Mitzie Hunter	June 13, 2016	Jan 17, 2018
Minister of Education	Indira Naidoo-Harris	Jan 17, 2018	June 29, 2018
Minister Responsible for Early Years and Child Care (Note: Was "Associate Minister of Education (Early Years and Child Care)" until her promotion as education minister on January 12, 2017, upon which the responsibility folded back into the education portfolio)	Indira Naidoo-Harris	August 24, 2016	June 29, 2018
Minister of Training, Colleges and Universities	Brad Duguid	Feb 11, 2013	June 24, 2014
Minister of Training, Colleges and Universities	Reza Moridi	June 24, 2014	June 13, 2016
Minister of Advanced Education and Skills Development	Deb Matthews	June 13, 2016	Jan 17, 2018
Minister of Advanced Education and Skills Development	Mitzie Hunter	Jan 17, 2018	June 29, 2018
Minister of Health and Long-Term Care	Deb Matthews	Feb 11, 2013	June 24, 2014
Minister of Health and Long-Term Care	Eric Hoskins	June 24, 2014	Feb 26, 2018
Minister of Health and Long-Term Care	Helena Jaczek	Feb 26, 2018	June 29, 2018
Associate Minister of Health and Long; Term Care (LTC and Wellness)	Dipika Damerla	June 24, 2014	June 13, 2016
Minister of Children and Youth Services	Teresa Piruzza	Feb 11, 2013	June 24, 2014
Minister of Children and Youth Services	Tracy MacCharles	June 24, 2014	June 13, 2016
Minister of Children and Youth Services	Michael Coteau	June 13, 2016	June 29, 2018
Minister of Community and Social Services	Ted McMeekin	Feb 11, 2013	June 24, 2014
Minister of Community and Social Services	Helena Jaczek	June 24, 2014	Feb 26, 2018
Minister of Community and Social Services	Michael Coteau	Feb 26, 2018	June 29, 2018
Minister of Labour	Yasir Naqvi	Feb 11, 2013	March 25, 2014
Minister of Labour	Kevin Flynn	March 25, 2014	June 29, 2018
Minister Responsible for Seniors (minister without portfolio)	Mario Sergio	Feb 11, 2013	June 13, 2016
Minister Responsible for Seniors (minister without portfolio)	Dipika Damerla	June 13, 2016	Jan 12, 2017
Minister of Senior Affairs (Note: elevated to status of full ministry January 12, 2017)	Dipika Damerla	Jan 12, 2017	June 29, 2018
Minister Responsible for Women's Issues	Laurel Broten	Feb 11, 2013	July 2, 2013
Minister Responsible for Women's Issues	Teresa Piruzza	July 2, 2013	June 24, 2014
Minister Responsible for Women's Issues	Tracy MacCharles (Note: while a minister portfolio between June 13, 2016 and January 12, 2017)	June 24, 2014	Jan 12, 2017
Minister of the Status of Women (Note: initially styled as "Minister of Women's issues" from January 12 to February 14, 2017)	Indira Naidoo-Harris	Jan 12, 2017	Jan 17, 2018
Minister of the Status of Women	Harinder Malhi	Jan 17, 2018	June 29, 2018
Industry and economic portfolios
Minister of Agriculture and Food	Kathleen Wynne	Feb 11, 2013	June 24, 2014
Minister of Agriculture, Food and Rural Affairs	Jeff Leal	June 24, 2014	June 29, 2018
Minister of Rural Affairs	Jeff Leal	Feb 11, 2013	June 24, 2014
Minister of Economic Development, Trade and Employment	Eric Hoskins	Feb 11, 2013	June 24, 2014
Minister of Economic Development, Employment and Infrastructure	Brad Duguid	June 24, 2014	June 13, 2016
Minister of Economic Development and Growth	Brad Duguid	June 13, 2016	Jan 17, 2018
Minister of Economic Development and Growth	Steven Del Duca	Jan 17, 2018	June 29, 2018
Minister of International Trade	Michael Chan	June 13, 2016	June 29, 2018
Minister of Tourism, Culture and Sport	Michael Chan	Feb 11, 2013	June 24, 2014
Minister of Tourism, Culture and Sport	Michael Coteau	June 24, 2014	June 13, 2016
Minister of Tourism, Culture and Sport	Eleanor McMahon	June 13, 2016	Jan 17, 2018
Minister of Tourism, Culture and Sport	Daiene Vernile	Jan 17, 2018	June 29, 2018
Minister of Research and Innovation (to June 13, 2016); Minister of Research, Innovation and Science	Reza Moridi	Feb 11, 2013	June 29, 2018
Resources portfolios
Minister of Energy	Bob Chiarelli	Feb 11, 2013	June 13, 2016
Minister of Energy	Glenn Thibeault	June 13, 2016	June 29, 2018
Minister of the Environment	Jim Bradley	Feb 11, 2013	June 24, 2014
Minister of Environment and Climate Change	Glen Murray	June 24, 2014	July 31, 2017
Minister of Environment and Climate Change	Chris Ballard	July 31, 2017	June 29, 2018
Minister of Natural Resources	David Orazietti	Feb 11, 2013	June 24, 2014
Minister of Natural Resources and Forestry	Bill Mauro	June 24, 2014	June 13, 2016
Minister of Natural Resources and Forestry	Kathryn McGarry	June 13, 2016	Jan 17, 2018
Minister of Natural Resources and Forestry	Nathalie Des Rosiers	Jan 17, 2018	June 29, 2018
Minister of Northern Development and Mines	Michael Gravelle	Feb 11, 2013	June 29, 2018
Public assets portfolios
Minister of Government Services	Harinder Takhar	Feb 11, 2013	May 8, 2013
Minister of Government Services	John Milloy	May 8, 2013	June 24, 2014
Minister of Government and Consumer Services	David Orazietti	June 24, 2014	June 13, 2016
Minister of Government and Consumer Services	Marie-France Lalonde	June 13, 2016	Jan 12, 2017
Minister of Government and Consumer Services	Tracy MacCharles	Jan 12, 2017	June 29, 2018
Minister of Consumer Services	Tracy MacCharles	Feb 11, 2013	June 24, 2014
Minister of Municipal Affairs and Housing	Linda Jeffrey	Feb 11, 2013	March 25, 2014
Minister of Municipal Affairs and Housing	Bill Mauro	March 25, 2014	June 24, 2014
Minister of Municipal Affairs and Housing	Ted McMeekin	June 24, 2014	June 13, 2016
Minister of Municipal Affairs	Bill Mauro	June 13, 2016	June 29, 2018
Minister of Housing	Chris Ballard	June 13, 2016	July 31, 2017
Minister of Housing	Peter Milczyn	July 31, 2017	June 29, 2018
Minister of Infrastructure	Glen Murray	Feb 11, 2013	June 24, 2014
Minister of Infrastructure	assigned to Economic Development	June 24, 2014	June 13, 2016
Minister of Infrastructure	Bob Chiarelli	June 13, 2016	June 29, 2018
Minister of Transportation	Glen Murray	Feb 11, 2013	June 24, 2014
Minister of Transportation	Steven Del Duca	June 24, 2014	Jan 17, 2018
Minister of Transportation	Kathryn McGarry	Jan 17, 2018	June 29, 2018
Other non-portfolio responsibilities
Chair of Cabinet	Linda Jeffrey	Feb 11, 2013	March 25, 2014
Chair of Cabinet	John Gerretsen	March 25, 2014	June 24, 2014
Chair of Cabinet	Jim Bradley	June 24, 2014	June 13, 2016
Chair of Cabinet	Deb Matthews	June 13, 2016	Jan 17, 2018
Chair of Cabinet	Helena Jaczek	Jan 17, 2018	June 29, 2018
House Leader	John Milloy (Note: while a Minister without portfolio February 11 to May 8, 2013)	Feb 11, 2013	May 2, 2014
House Leader	Yasir Naqvi	May 2, 2014	May 8, 2018
Deputy House Leader	Jim Bradley	Feb 11, 2013	June 13, 2016
Deputy House Leader	Jim Bradley (ultra-ministry)	June 13, 2016	May 8, 2018
Minister Responsible for the 2015; Pan and Parapan American Games	Michael Chan	February 11, 2013	June 24, 2014
Minister Responsible for the 2015; Pan and Parapan American Games	Michael Coteau	June 24, 2014	June 13, 2016
Minister Responsible for the Poverty Reduction Strategy	Deb Matthews	June 24, 2014	June 13, 2016
Minister Responsible for the Poverty Reduction Strategy	Chris Ballard	June 13, 2016	July 31, 2017
Minister Responsible for the Poverty Reduction Strategy	Peter Milczyn	July 31, 2017	June 29, 2018
Minister Responsible for Anti-Racism	Michael Coteau	February 16, 2016	June 29, 2018
Minister Responsible for Accessibility	Tracy MacCharles	June 13, 2016	
Minister Responsible for Digital Government	Deb Matthews	June 13, 2016	Jan 17, 2018
Minister Responsible for Digital Government	Eleanor McMahon	January 17, 2018	June 29, 2018
Minister Responsible for Small Business	Jeff Leal	Jan 12, 2017	June 29, 2018
