= Mitzie Hunter =

Canadian politician (born 1971)

The Honourable Mitzie Hunter ECO
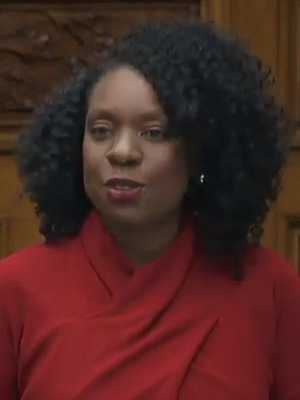
- Hunter in 2019

Member of the Ontario Provincial Parliament for Scarborough—Guildwood
- In office August 1, 2013 – May 10, 2023
- Preceded by: Margarett Best
- Succeeded by: Andrea Hazell

Deputy Leader of the Ontario Liberal Party
- In office August 8, 2022 – May 10, 2023
- Leader: John Fraser

Ontario Minister of Education
- In office June 13, 2016 – January 17, 2018
- Leader: Kathleen Wynne
- Preceded by: Liz Sandals
- Succeeded by: Indira Naidoo-Harris

Personal details
- Born: Mitzie Jacquelin Hunter; September 14, 1971 (age 55) Jamaica
- Party: Liberal
- Education: University of Toronto (MBA, BA)

Mitzie Jacquelin Hunter (born September 14, 1971) is a Canadian politician who represented Scarborough—Guildwood as a member of provincial parliament in the Legislative Assembly of Ontario from 2013 to 2023. A member of the Ontario Liberal Party, Hunter was a provincial cabinet minister from 2014 to 2018 and was the deputy leader of the party from 2022 to 2023. She resigned from the Ontario legislature on May 10, 2023, in order to be a candidate for mayor of Toronto in the 2023 by-election, in which she placed sixth with 2.9% of the vote. She is currently President and CEO of the Canadian Women's Foundation.

== Background ==
Mitzie Jacquelin Hunter was born in Jamaica on September 14, 1971. Her family immigrated to Canada in 1975, moving to Scarborough. Hunter graduated from the Scarborough campus of the University of Toronto with a Bachelor of Arts before earning a Master of Business Administration from the Rotman School of Management.

She was CEO of the Greater Toronto CivicAction Alliance, and was previously CAO of Toronto Community Housing. She also served as Vice President at Goodwill Industries of Toronto.

She co-chaired John Tory's 2003 Mayoral bid. She was later CEO of CivicAction.

== Political career ==
In 2013 she ran as the Liberal candidate in a by-election called to replace Margarett Best, a member of the Ontario Parliament who resigned for health reasons. She defeated Progressive Conservative candidate Ken Kirupa by 1,246 votes. She faced Kirupa again in 2014 this time defeating him by 7,610 votes.

In June 2014, she was appointed as associate minister for the Ministry of Finance responsible for the Ontario Retirement Pension Plan.

As the Liberal MPP for Scarborough-Guildwood, Mitzie Hunter, introduced the Toronto Ranked Ballots Election Act in March 2014. The bill passed the second reading, but died prematurely when the election was called.

On June 13, 2016, she was promoted to the senior position of minister of education.

On January 17, 2018, it was announced that Hunter would leave her position as minister of education to replace outgoing Deb Matthews as the minister of advanced education and skills development.

The Liberals suffered its worst electoral defeat in the 2018 Ontario provincial election both in terms of seat count (seven) and popular vote (19.6%), losing official party status at the Legislative Assembly of Ontario. It was also the worst defeat of a governing party in Ontario history. However she was narrowly re-elected in the 2018 Ontario Election, by a factor of 74 votes, as one of 7 remaining MPPs.

In 2019, she attempted to change the Ontario Liberal Party away from a delegated convention, however she only reached 57% support, shy of the 66% of the vote she needed.

On August 14, 2019, Hunter announced her candidacy for the 2020 Ontario Liberal Party leadership race. At the leadership convention on March 7, 2020, she finished fourth. She was re-elected in the 2022 Ontario general election.

Hunter became deputy leader of the Ontario Liberals and was considered a possible candidate in the 2023 Ontario Liberal Party leadership election. However, in March 2023, she said that she would be resigning her seat as an MPP to run in the 2023 Toronto mayoral by-election. Hunter lost the election to Olivia Chow, placing sixth with 2.9% of the vote.

=== Cabinet positions ===
Wynne ministry, Province of Ontario (2013–2018)
Cabinet posts (3)
Predecessor	Office	Successor
Deb Matthews	Minister of Advanced Education and Skills Development; 2018 (January–June)	Merrilee Fullerton
Liz Sandals	Minister of Education; 2016-2018	Indira Naidoo-Harris
New position	Associate Minister of Finance; 2014-2016; Responsible for Ontario Retirement Pension Plan	Indira Naidoo-Harris

=== Electoral record ===
2023 Toronto mayoral by-election
Candidate	Votes	%
Olivia Chow	268,676	37.17
Ana Bailão	234,647	32.46
Mark Saunders	62,017	8.58
Anthony Furey	35,839	4.96
Josh Matlow	35,516	4.91
Mitzie Hunter	21,170	2.93
Chloe Brown	18,763	2.60
95 other candidates	46,249	6.39
Total	722,877	100.00
Source: City of Toronto

2022 Ontario general election: Scarborough—Guildwood
Party	Candidate	Votes	%	±%	Expenditures
Liberal	Mitzie Hunter	13,405	46.31	+12.96	$87,259
Progressive Conservative	Alicia Vianga	9,123	31.51	–1.62	$78,144
New Democratic	Veronica Javier	4,824	16.66	–10.96	$42,008
Green	Dean Boulding	818	2.83	+0.38	$381
New Blue	Opa Hope Day	366	1.26	–	$1,980
Ontario Party	William Moore	265	0.92	–	$0
People's Political Party	Kevin Clarke	148	0.51	+0.09	$0
Total valid votes/expense limit		28,949	99.12	–	$98,214
Total rejected, unmarked and declined ballots		256	0.88	–0.33	
Turnout		29,205	41.63	–11.30	
Eligible voters		70,153			
Liberal hold		Swing		+7.29	
Source: Elections Ontario

2018 Ontario general election: Scarborough—Guildwood
Party	Candidate	Votes	%	±%
Liberal	Mitzie Hunter	11,972	33.34	-16.72
Progressive Conservative	Roshan Nallaratnam	11,898	33.14	+5.42
New Democratic	Tom Packwood	9,917	27.62	+10.7
Green	Linda Rice	878	2.45	-0.49
Libertarian	Hamid-Reza Dehnad-Tabatabaei	445	1.24	-0.12
Trillium	George Marcos Garvida	419	1.17	
Special Needs	Wanda Ryan	159	0.44	
The People	Heather Dunbar	151	0.42	
Independent	Benjamin Mbaegbu	66	0.18	
Total valid votes		35,905	100.0	
Liberal hold		Swing		-11.05
Source: Elections Ontario

2014 Ontario general election
Party	Candidate	Votes	%	±%
Liberal	Mitzie Hunter	17,498	50.06	+14.21
Progressive Conservative	Ken Kirupa	9,688	27.72	-3.08
New Democratic	Shuja Syed	5,915	16.92	-11.43
Green	Jeffrey W. R. Bustard	1,029	2.94	+0.79
Libertarian	Richard Kerr	476	1.36	+0.87
Freedom	Khalid Mokhtarzada	228	0.65	+0.33
Canadians' Choice	John Sawdon	120	0.34	
Total valid votes		34,954	100.0	
Liberal hold		Swing		+8.64
Source: Elections Ontario

Ontario provincial by-election, August 1, 2013 Resignation of Margarett Best
Party	Candidate	Votes	%	±%
Liberal	Mitzie Hunter	8,852	35.85	-13.09
Progressive Conservative	Ken Kirupa	7,605	30.80	+2.15
New Democratic	Adam Giambrone	7,000	28.35	+8.93
Green	Nick Leeson	532	2.15	+0.86
Independent	Jim Hamilton	195	0.79	
Special Needs	Danish Ahmed	183	0.74	
Libertarian	Heath Thomas	120	0.49	-0.79
Family Coalition	Raphael Rosch	104	0.42	
Freedom	Matthew Oliver	80	0.32	-0.10
The People	Bill Rawdah	22	0.09	
Total valid votes		24,693	100.00	
Total rejected, unmarked and declined ballots		180	0.72	
Turnout		24,873	35.83	
Eligible voters		69,425		
Liberal hold		Swing		-7.62
Source: Elections Ontario
