= Eric Hoskins =

Canadian physician and politician (born 1960)

The Honourable Eric Hoskins OC MSC ECO
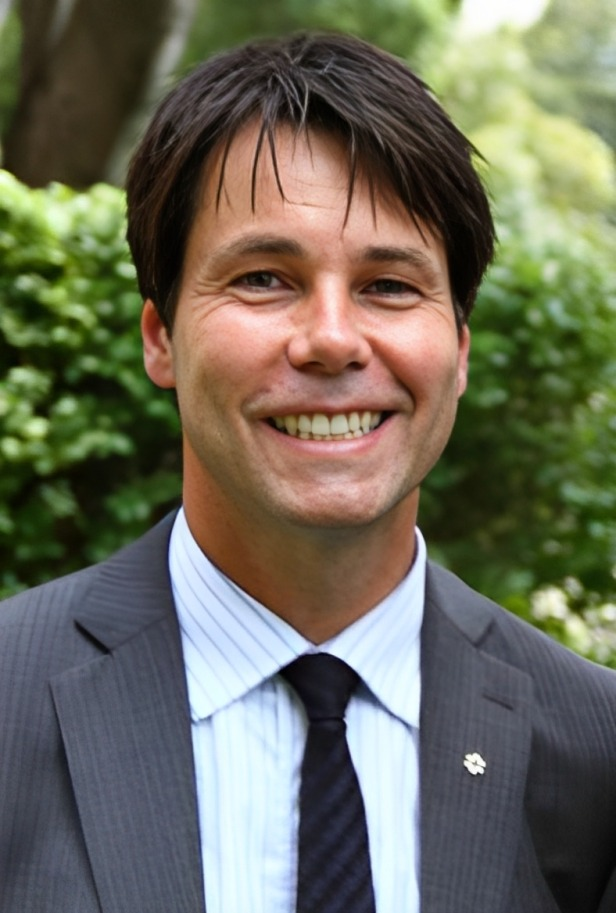
- Hoskins in 2012

Member of Provincial Parliament for St. Paul's
- In office September 17, 2009 – February 26, 2018
- Preceded by: Michael Bryant
- Succeeded by: Jill Andrew

Minister of Health and Long-Term Care
- In office June 24, 2014 – February 26, 2018
- Premier: Kathleen Wynne
- Preceded by: Deb Matthews
- Succeeded by: Helena Jaczek

More...

Personal details
- Born: Eric William Hoskins; November 29, 1960 (age 65) Simcoe, Ontario, Canada
- Party: Ontario Liberal
- Spouse: Samantha Nutt
- Education: McMaster University; Balliol College, Oxford; London School of Hygiene & Tropical Medicine
- Occupation: Physician, politician, humanitarian

Eric William Hoskins OC MSC ECO (born November 29, 1960) is a Canadian physician and former politician who served as an Ontario cabinet minister from 2010 to 2018. A member of the Ontario Liberal Party, he represented Toronto—St. Paul's in the Legislative Assembly of Ontario from 2009 to 2018. Hoskins served in the governments of Dalton McGuinty and Kathleen Wynne, holding the portfolios of Health and Long-Term Care (2014–2018), Economic Development, Trade, and Employment (2013–2014), Children and Youth Services (2011–2012), and Citizenship and Immigration (2010–2011). In 2013, he contended for the leadership of the Ontario Liberal Party, which was won by Kathleen Wynne.

Before entering politics, Hoskins was the president of War Child Canada and was made an Officer of the Order of Canada in 2008 for his humanitarian work. Hoskins resigned from cabinet and the legislature on February 26, 2018, three months before the provincial election. On June 20, 2018, the federal government announced that Hoskins had been appointed Chair of the Advisory Council on the Implementation of National Pharmacare.

== Early life and education ==
Hoskins was born on November 29, 1960, in Simcoe, Ontario. After he attended Simcoe Composite School for high school, Hoskins completed a bachelor of science (B.Sc.) in chemistry at McMaster University in 1982 and graduated with a doctor of medicine (M.D.) from McMaster University Medical School in 1985. After an internship in internal medicine, Hoskins was awarded a Rhodes scholarship and subsequently continued his studies at the University of Oxford where he completed a doctor of philosophy (DPhil) in public health and epidemiology. Hoskins also holds a master of science (M.Sc.) from the London School of Hygiene & Tropical Medicine and a postgraduate diploma in health economics from The University of Aberdeen. He is a fellow of the Royal College of Physicians and Surgeons of Canada and is board-certified in the specialty of community medicine (public health).

== Career ==
=== Working in conflict areas ===
From 1987 to 1990, Hoskins lived and worked in Sudan providing humanitarian relief to Ethiopian refugees in eastern Sudan, and to displaced civilians in southern Sudan. In 1991, Hoskins co-founded the International Study Team, and led a group of international experts to examine the impact of war on the civilian population in Iraq. The study provided a detailed humanitarian assessment of post-Gulf War Iraq.

Having seen the impact of war on Iraqi children, Hoskins lobbied the Canadian government to release over 2 million dollars of frozen Iraqi assets held in Canadian banks, and spent the following two years overseeing the purchase and distribution of food and medicine to tens of thousands of at-risk Iraqi children.

=== Department of Foreign Affairs ===
In 1997, Hoskins joined the Department of Foreign Affairs Canada as Lloyd Axworthy's Senior Policy Advisor. While at the Department of Foreign Affairs, he was responsible for contributing to Canadian foreign policy in the areas of human rights, human security, humanitarian affairs, peace building, war-affected children and Africa.

Hoskins later also served as an advisor to the Office of the Special Representative for Children and Armed Conflict at the United Nations, and has been involved in setting United Nations policy on issues concerning the protection of children living with war.

=== War Child Canada ===
Hoskins is the co-founder and former president of War Child Canada, a charitable organization that works to raise funds for relief and development programs in support of war-affected children around the world. Working alongside his wife, War Child Executive Director Samantha Nutt, Hoskins helped the organization develop international relief programs and spread awareness of the issues facing war-affected children. He worked with the United Nations and non-governmental organizations in some of the world's worst conflict areas including Sudan, Ethiopia, Eritrea, Somalia, Sierra Leone, Iraq, Burundi, Afghanistan and Pakistan.

As President of War Child Canada, Hoskins was a frequent contributor to Maclean's magazine on war-related issues. He was a regular commentator on CTV, CBC and other major broadcast networks concerning the impact of war on civilians. In 2008, Hoskins was made an Officer of the Order of Canada for his humanitarian work.

=== First foray into politics ===
On April 21, 2007, Hoskins was chosen as the Liberal candidate in the riding of Haldimand—Norfolk for the 2008 Federal election. On October 14, 2008, he was defeated by Conservative incumbent Diane Finley.

=== Provincial politics ===
On August 12, 2009, Hoskins was nominated as the provincial Liberal candidate in the St. Paul's by-election. On September 19, 2009, he defeated Toronto Sun columnist Sue-Ann Levy running for the Progressive Conservatives.

On January 18, 2010, he was named Minister of Citizenship and Immigration in Dalton McGuinty's second government.

In the 2011 Ontario election, Hoskins was easily re-elected defeating PC candidate Christine McGirr by 16,076 votes. After the election he was appointed as Minister of Children and Youth Services.

Hoskins resigned on November 9, 2012, to stand as a candidate in the Ontario Liberal Party leadership election. He was eliminated after the first ballot and he endorsed Kathleen Wynne, the eventual winner. On February 11, 2013, he was appointed Minister of Economic Development, Trade & Employment.

Hoskins was re-elected in June 2014, and was appointed by Kathleen Wynne as Minister of Health and Long-Term Care.

On February 26, 2018, Hoskins announced his resignation as an MPP and as Minister of Health and Long-Term Care.

=== Chair of the Advisory Council on the Implementation of National Pharmacare ===
On June 20, 2018, Prime Minister Justin Trudeau appointed Hoskins to head a national pharmacare strategy.

== Awards and recognition ==
In April 2008, Hoskins was made an Officer of the Order of Canada by Governor General Michaëlle Jean for his humanitarian work. At age 33, Hoskins became the youngest recipient of the United Nations Association in Canada's Lester B. Pearson Peace Medal and was later awarded the Meritorious Service Cross by the Governor General of Canada in the name of the Queen of Canada for his work in war-torn communities around the world.

Hoskins has been awarded the Ministry of Citizenship and Immigration Citation for Citizenship, was a member of Canada's Top 40 Under 40 Award, and won the Distinguished Alumni Award from McMaster University.

Hoskins and his wife, Samantha Nutt, received Honorary Doctorates of Law from McMaster University in May 2005 for their work promoting human rights and their role in delivering humanitarian assistance to some of the world's most vulnerable populations. Hoskins also has honorary degrees from Brock and Niagara University.

== Electoral record ==
2014 Ontario general election
| Party | Candidate | Votes | % | ±% |
|---|---|---|---|---|
| Liberal | Eric Hoskins | 30,036 | 59.65 | +1.26 |
| Progressive Conservative | Justine Deluce | 12,032 | 23.89 | +2.97 |
| New Democratic | Luke Savage | 5,142 | 10.21 | -6.40 |
| Green | Josh Rachlis | 2,556 | 5.08 | +2.33 |
| Libertarian | John Kittredge | 413 | 0.82 | +0.04 |
| Freedom | Mike Rita | 176 | 0.35 | +0.15 |
| Total valid votes | | 50,355 | 100.0 | |
Source: Elections Ontario

2011 Ontario general election: St. Paul's
| Party | Candidate | Votes | % |
|---|---|---|---|
| Liberal | Eric Hoskins | 25,048 | 58.39 |
| Progressive Conservative | Christine McGirr | 8,972 | 20.92 |
| New Democratic | David Hynes | 7,124 | 16.61 |
| Green | Judith Van Veldhuysen | 1,180 | 2.75 |
| Libertarian | John Kittredge | 335 | 0.78 |
| Freedom | Mike Rita | 86 | 0.20 |
| Socialist | Keith Pinto | 83 | 0.19 |
| Northern Ontario Heritage | David Vallance | 69 | 0.16 |
Source(s) Official Return from the Records - 2011 General Election - 077 ST. PAUL'S.pdf, available for download at https://results.elections.on.ca/en/publications, by Elections Ontario.

Ontario provincial by-election, September 17, 2009: St. Paul's Resignation of Michael Bryant
| Party | Candidate | Votes | % | ±% |
|---|---|---|---|---|
| Liberal | Eric Hoskins | 13,181 | | |
| Progressive Conservative | Sue-Ann Levy | 7,851 | | |
| New Democratic | Julian Heller | 4,691 | | |
| Green | Chris Chopik | 1,516 | | |
| Libertarian | John Kittredge | 160 | | |
| Special Needs | Danish Ahmed | 96 | | |
| Independent | Marius Frederick | 84 | | |
| Freedom | Paul McKeever | 61 | | |
| Independent | John Turmel | 47 | | |
| Independent | Raj Rama | 24 | | |
| Voter Turnout | | 27,830 | | |
| Liberal hold | | Swing | | |
Source(s) Official Return from the Records - 2009 By Election%C2%A0(ED077) - 077 ST. PAUL'S.pdf, available for download at https://results.elections.on.ca/en/publications, by Elections Ontario.

Haldimand—Norfolk - 2008 Canadian federal election
| Party | Candidate | Votes | % | ±% | |
|---|---|---|---|---|---|
| Conservative | Diane Finley | 19,657 | 40.8% | -7.5% | $67,583 |
| Liberal | Eric Hoskins | 15,577 | 32.4% | -1.9% | $72,913 |
| New Democratic | Ian Nichols | 5,549 | 11.5% | -1.3% | $5,509 |
| Independent | Gary McHale | 4,821 | 10.0% | – | $22,798 |
| Green | Stephana Johnston | 2,041 | 4.2% | +0.7% | $2,581 |
| Christian Heritage | Steven Elgersma | 501 | 1.0% | 0.0% | – |
| Total valid votes/Expense limit | | 48,146 | 100% | $85,391 | |
| Majority | | 4,080 | 8.48% | | |
| Total rejected ballots | | 248 | – | | |
| Turnout | | 48,394 | % | | |

Wynne ministry, Province of Ontario (2013–2018)
Cabinet posts (2)
| Predecessor | Office | Successor |
|---|---|---|
| Deb Matthews | Minister of Health and Long Term Care; 2014–2018 | Helena Jaczek |
| Brad Duguid | Minister of Economic Development, Trade and Employment; 2013–2014 | Brad Duguid |
McGuinty ministry, Province of Ontario (2003–2013)
Cabinet posts (2)
| Predecessor | Office | Successor |
| Laurel Broten | Minister of Children and Youth Services; 2011–2012 | Teresa Piruzza |
| Michael Chan | Minister of Citizenship and Immigration; 2010–2012 | Charles Sousa |
