= Office of Women's Social and Economic Opportunity =

Office in the government of Ontario, Canada

- Office de la condition féminine

Agency overview
- Preceding agencies: Ministry of the Status of Women; Ontario Women's Directorate; Office of Women's Issues
- Headquarters: 900 Bay Street Toronto, Ontario
- Minister responsible: Charmaine Williams, Associate Minister of Women’s Social and Economic Opportunity
- Website: www.ontario.ca/page/womens-social-and-economic-opportunity

The Office of Women's Social and Economic Opportunity, formerly the Ministry of the Status of Women (French: Ministère de la Condition féminine, between 2017 and 2018), Ontario Women's Directorate (French: Direction générale de la condition féminine de l'Ontario, prior to 2017) and Office of Women's Issues(French: Office de la condition féminine), between 2018 and 2022 is an office within the Ministry of Children, Community and Social Services in the province of Ontario, responsible for women's issues including violence against women and economic inequality.

It is overseen by the Associate Minister of Women's Social and Economic Opportunity, a member of the Executive Council of Ontario. The current minister is Charmaine Williams, appointed in June 2022.

== History ==
The Women's Bureau was created in 1963 in the Department of Labour to foster fuller utilization of the female labour force. In December 1970, the Bureau was given responsibility for administering the Women's Equal Employment Opportunities Act. However, in June 1972, this Act was repealed, and its provisions were incorporated into the Ontario Human Rights Code. As a result, the Women's Bureau was transferred to the Ontario Human Rights Commission in 1972. Late in 1973, a Women's Program Division was created within the Ministry of Labour, and the Women's Bureau was transferred back to the labour ministry. In 1978, the Women's Program Division was disbanded, and the Bureau reported directly to the Deputy Minister of Labour.

The Ontario Women's Directorate was established by Premier Bill Davis in 1983, with the appointment of Deputy Premier Bob Welch as the inaugural Minister Responsible for Women's Issues. Glenna Carr was appointed as the first executive director of the Directorate. The Women's Bureau was transferred to the Directorate, and was eventually fully absorbed by the Directorate.

In January 2017, the Directorate was elevated by Ontario's first female Premier Kathleen Wynne to a new stand-alone ministry called the Ministry of the Status of Women, with a dedicated full minister titled Minister of the Status of Women. However, this elevated status was short-lived. In June 2018, Premier Doug Ford downgraded the ministry back to non-portfolio responsibilities, overseen by first the Minister Responsible for Women's Issues, then the Associate Minister of Children and Women's Issues and now the Associate Minister of Women's Social and Economic Opportunity.

== List of ministers ==
Key:

Ontario New Democratic Party
Progressive Conservative Party of Ontario
Ontario Liberal Party

Portrait	Name	Term of office		Tenure	Political party (Ministry)	Note
Minister responsible for Women's Issues					PC (Davis)	
	Robert Welch	May 17, 1983	February 8, 1985	1 year, 267 days	PC (Davis)	While Deputy Premier
	Dennis Timbrell	February 8, 1985	June 26, 1985	138 days	PC (Miller)	While Minister of Municipal Affairs and Housing
	Ian Scott	June 26, 1985	September 29, 1987	2 years, 95 days	Liberal (Peterson)	While Attorney General and Minister responsible for Native Affairs
	Greg Sorbara	September 29, 1987	August 2, 1989	1 year, 307 days	Liberal (Peterson)	While Minister of Labour
	Mavis Wilson	August 2, 1989	October 1, 1990	1 year, 60 days	Liberal (Peterson)	
	Anne Swarbrick	October 1, 1990	September 11, 1991	345 days	NDP (Rae)	
	Marion Boyd	September 11, 1991	June 26, 1995	3 years, 288 days	NDP (Rae)	While Minister of Education (until October 15, 1991), Minister of Community and Social Services (October 15, 1991 to February 3, 1993) and Minister of Justice and Attorney General (from February 3, 1993)
	Dianne Cunningham	June 26, 1995	June 17, 1999	3 years, 356 days (first instance)	PC (Harris)	While Minister of Intergovernmental Affairs
	Helen Johns	June 17, 1999	February 7, 2001	1 year, 235 days	PC (Harris)	While Minister of Citizenship, Culture and Recreation & Minister Responsible for Seniors Affairs
	Dianne Cunningham	February 8, 2001	April 14, 2002	2 years, 256 days (second instance); 6 years, 247 days in total	PC (Harris)	While Minister of Training, Colleges and Universities
	Dianne Cunningham	April 15, 2002	October 22, 2003	2 years, 256 days (second instance); 6 years, 247 days in total	PC (Eves)	While Minister of Training, Colleges and Universities
	Sandra Pupatello	October 23, 2003	October 30, 2007	4 years, 7 days	Liberal (McGuinty)	While Minister of Community and Social Services (until April 5, 2006), Minister of Education (April 5, 2006 to September 18, 2006), Minister of Economic Development and Trade (from September 16, 2006)
	Deb Matthews	October 30, 2007	October 7, 2009	1 year, 342 days	Liberal (McGuinty)	While Minister of Children and Youth Services
	Laurel Broten	October 7, 2009	February 11, 2013	3 years, 268 days	Liberal (McGuinty)	While Minister of Children and Youth Services (until October 20, 2011), Minister of Education (from October 20, 2011) and Interim Minister of Children and Youth Services (from November 13, 2012)
	Laurel Broten	February 11, 2013	July 2, 2013	3 years, 268 days	Liberal (Wynne)	While Minister of Intergovernmental Affairs
	Teresa Piruzza	July 2, 2013	June 24, 2014	357 days	Liberal (Wynne)	While Minister of Children and Youth Services
	Tracy MacCharles	June 24, 2014	January 12, 2017	2 years, 202 days	Liberal (Wynne)	While Minister of Children and Youth Services (until June 13, 2016), Minister Responsible for Accessibility (from June 13, 2016)
Minister of the Status of Women					Liberal (Wynne)	
	Indira Naidoo-Harris	January 12, 2017	January 17, 2018	1 year, 5 days	Liberal (Wynne)	Styled as Minister of Women's Issues until February 14, 2017
	Harinder Malhi	January 17, 2018	June 29, 2018	163 days	Liberal (Wynne)	
Minister responsible for Women's Issues					PC (Ford)	
	Lisa MacLeod	June 29, 2018	June 20, 2019	356 days	PC (Ford)	While Minister of Children, Community and Social Services
Associate Minister of Children and Women's Issues					PC (Ford)	
	Jill Dunlop	June 20, 2019	June 24, 2022	3 years and 4 days	PC (Ford)	
Associate Minister of Women's Social and Economic Opportunity					PC (Ford)	
	Charmaine Williams	June 24, 2022	Present	4 years, 150 days	PC (Ford)	
