= Deb Matthews =

Canadian politician

The Honourable Deb Matthews ECO
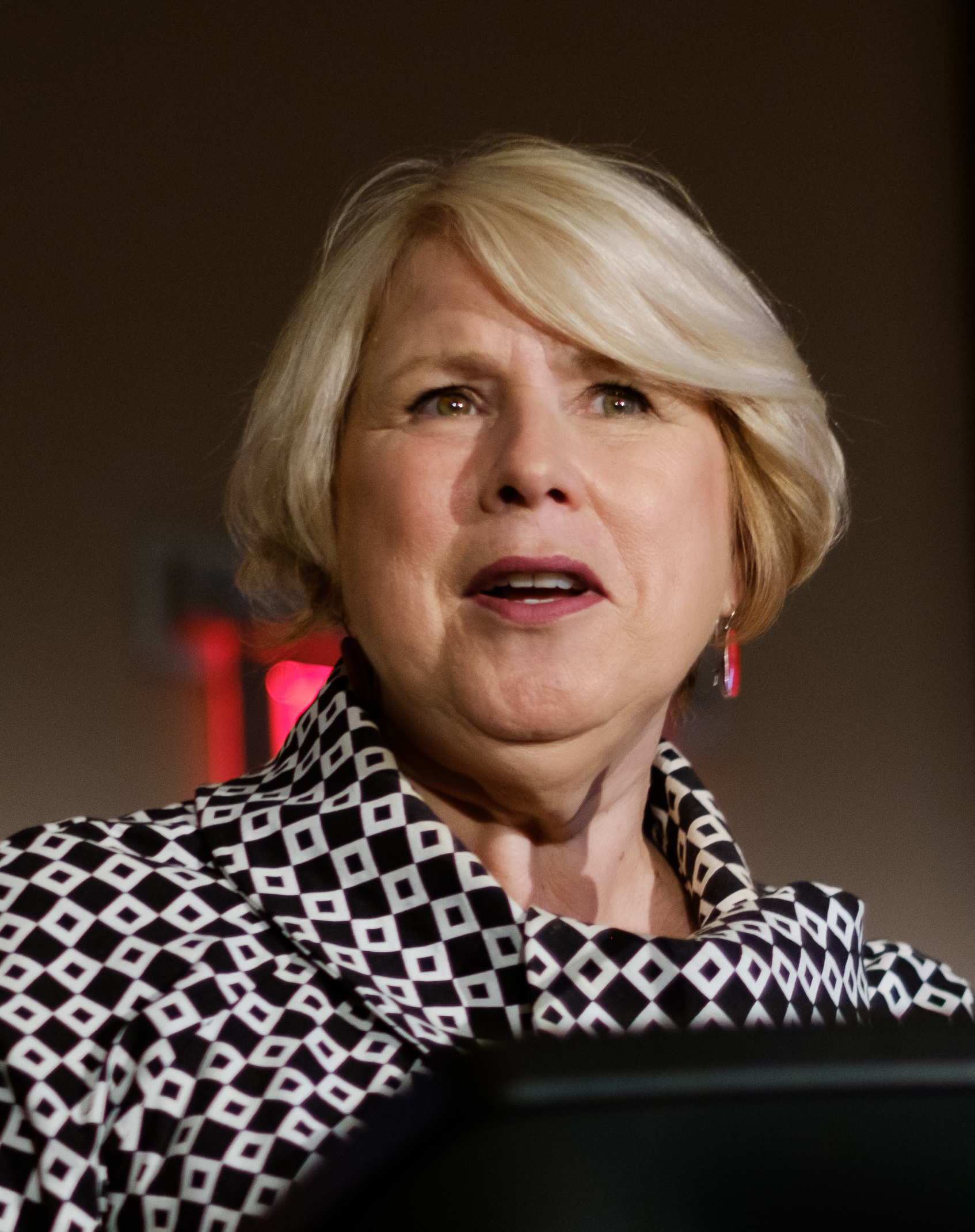
- Matthews speaking at the 2017 Creative Commons Global Summit

10th Deputy Premier of Ontario
- In office February 11, 2013 – January 17, 2018
- Premier: Kathleen Wynne
- Preceded by: Dwight Duncan
- Succeeded by: Christine Elliott

Member of Provincial Parliament for London North Centre
- In office October 2, 2003 – June 6, 2018
- Preceded by: Dianne Cunningham
- Succeeded by: Terence Kernaghan

Personal details
- Born: Deborah Drake Matthews; November 2, 1953 (age 73) London, Ontario, Canada
- Party: Ontario Liberal

Deborah Drake Matthews ECO (born 1953) is a former Canadian politician who served as the 10th deputy premier of Ontario from 2013 to 2018. A member of the Liberal Party, Matthews was the member of Provincial Parliament (MPP) for London North Centre from 2003 to 2018, and was a cabinet minister from 2008 to 2018 in the governments of Dalton McGuinty and Kathleen Wynne.

== Early life and education ==
Her father is Donald Jeune Matthews, former president of the Progressive Conservative Party of Canada from 1971 to 1974, and her sister is Shelley Peterson, the wife of former Ontario Premier David Peterson.

She graduated from St. George's Public School and A.B. Lucas Secondary School. She studied at the University of Western Ontario where she earned a PhD in social demography. Her doctoral dissertation was entitled the "Consequences of immigrant concentration in Canada, 2001–2051."

== Political career ==
=== 2003 election ===
In the 2003 election, Matthews defeated Progressive Conservative cabinet minister Dianne Cunningham by almost 7,000 votes.

=== 2007 election and in cabinet ===
Matthews was re-elected in the 2007 election. She was appointed as the minister of children and youth services and minister responsible for women's issues after the election. On December 4, 2008, Matthews introduced Ontario's Poverty Reduction Strategy as chair of the Cabinet Committee on Poverty Reduction. The long-term reduction plan set a target to reduce the number of children living in poverty by 25 per cent over 5 years

=== 2011 election ===
Matthews was re-elected in the 2011 election, and was re-appointed as health minister on October 20, 2011. In 2012, Matthews came under pressure because of revelations at Ornge, Ontario's air ambulance service. Members of the opposition Progressive Conservative and New Democratic parties called for her to resign. In response to the revelations at Ornge, Matthews announced an Ontario Provincial Police (OPP) investigation.

=== 2014 election ===
Following her re-election in 2014, Matthews was shuffled from health to a revamped role as president of the Treasury Board. On June 13, 2016, she retained her position as deputy premier and was also appointed as minister of advanced education and skills development. She was additionally responsible for digital government. Matthews left cabinet on January 17, 2018, having declined re-election in the 2018 election.

=== Cabinet positions ===
Wynne ministry, Province of Ontario (2013–2018)
Preceded by Dwight Duncan	Deputy Premier of Ontario (Note: title, function or designation without a ministerial portfolio); 2013-2018	Dormant Title next held by Christine Elliott
Preceded by Reza Moridi as Minister of Training, Colleges and Universities	Minister of Advanced Education and Skills Development; 2016-2018	Succeeded by Mitzie Hunter
Preceded by Charles Sousa as Chair of the Management Board of Cabinet	President of the Treasury Board; 2014-2016	Succeeded by Liz Sandals
Preceded by herself in McGuinty ministry	Minister of Health and Long-Term Care; 2013–2014	Succeeded by Eric Hoskins
Preceded by Jim Bradley	Chair of Cabinet; 2016-2018	Succeeded by Helena Jaczek
Preceded by new ministerial designation	Minister Responsible for Digital Government; 2016-2018	Succeeded by Eleanor McMahon
Preceded by new ministerial designation	Minister Responsible for the Poverty Reduction Strategy; 2014-2016	Succeeded by Chris Ballard
McGuinty ministry, Province of Ontario (2003–2013)
Preceded by David Caplan	Minister of Health and Long-Term Care; 2009–2013	Succeeded by herself in Wynne ministry
Preceded by Mary Anne Chambers	Minister of Children and Youth Services; 2007–2009	Succeeded by Laurel Broten
Preceded by Sandra Pupatello	Minister responsible for Women's Issues; 2007–2009	Succeeded by Laurel Broten

== Electoral record ==
2014 Ontario general election
Party	Candidate	Votes	%	±%
Liberal	Deb Matthews	16,379	35.98%	-7.93%
New Democratic	Judy Bryant	13,853	30.43%	+7.72%
Progressive Conservative	Nancy Branscombe	12,016	26.40%	-2.53%
Green	Kevin Labonte	2,445	5.37%	+2.05%
Freedom	Salim Mansur	639	1.40%	+0.78%
Communist	Dave McKee	115	0.25%	–
Pauper	Michael Spottiswood	70	0.15%	+0.03%

2011 Ontario general election
Party	Candidate	Votes	%	±%
Liberal	Deb Matthews	19,167	43.91%	-3.26%
Progressive Conservative	Nancy Branscombe	12,628	28.93%	+5.21%
New Democratic	Steve Holmes	9,914	22.71%	+6.06%
Green	Kevin Labonte	1,451	3.32%	-9.13%
Freedom	Mary Lou Ambrogio	269	0.62%	–
Libertarian	Jordan Vanklinken	169	0.39%	–
Pauper	Michael Spottiswood	54	0.12%	–

2007 Ontario general election
Party	Candidate	Votes	%	±%
Liberal	Deb Matthews	21,669	47.17%	+3.74%
Progressive Conservative	Rob Alder	10,897	23.72%	-5.20%
New Democratic	Steve Holmes	7,649	16.65%	-7.88%
Green	Brett McKenzie	5,720	12.45%	+10.77%

2003 Ontario general election
Party	Candidate	Votes	%	±%
Liberal	Deb Matthews	20,212	43.43%	+22.54%
Progressive Conservative	Dianne Cunningham	13,460	28.92%	-11.29%
New Democratic	Rebecca Coulter	11,414	24.53%	-11.93%
Green	Bronagh Joyce Morgan	780	1.68%	+0.88%
Family Coalition	Craig Smith	432	0.93%	-0.09%
Freedom	Lisa Turner	242	0.52%	+0.18%
