= Indira Naidoo-Harris =

Canadian politician

The Honourable Indira Naidoo-Harris ECO
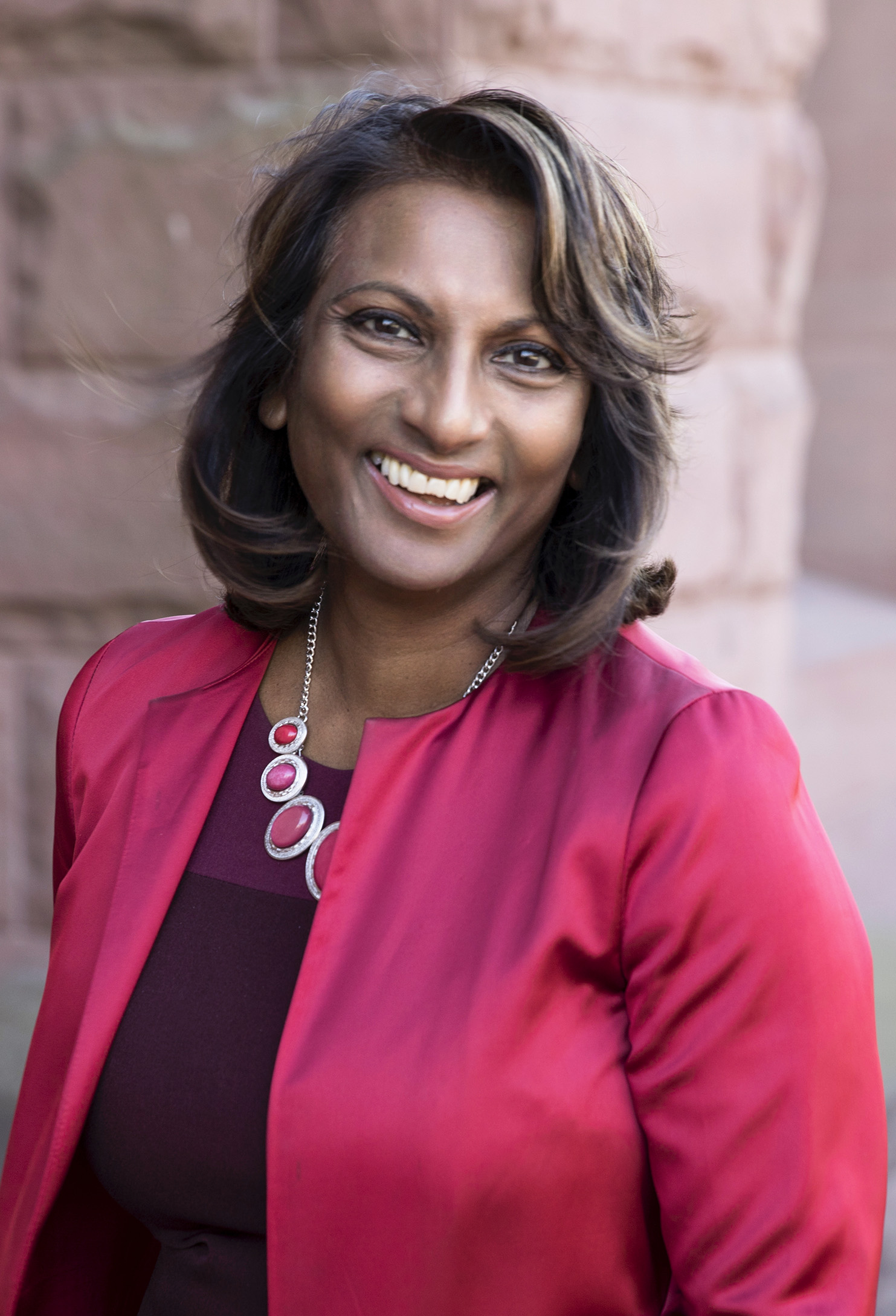
- Naidoo-Harris in 2017

Ontario Minister of Education
- In office January 17, 2018 – June 29, 2018
- Premier: Kathleen Wynne
- Preceded by: Mitzie Hunter
- Succeeded by: Lisa Thompson

Member of Provincial Parliament for Halton
- In office 2014–2018
- Preceded by: Ted Chudleigh
- Succeeded by: Parm Gill

Personal details
- Born: Durban, South Africa
- Party: Liberal Party
- Spouse: Randy Allen Harris
- Children: 2, including Galen
- Profession: Journalist, university administration

Indira Naidoo-Harris is a former Canadian politician and journalist who was elected to the Legislative Assembly of Ontario in the 2014 provincial election, sitting as the member of Provincial Parliament (MPP) for Halton until 2018. A member of the Ontario Liberal Party, Naidoo-Harris was the province's Minister of Education in 2018, Minister of the Status of Women from 2017 to 2018, early years and child care Minister from 2016 to 2018, and Associate Minister of Finance in 2016.

== Background ==
Naidoo-Harris was born in Durban, South Africa under apartheid. She immigrated to Canada as a child and grew up in Alberta. She graduated from the University of Lethbridge and moved briefly to the United States in Troy, New York, where she developed a broadcasting career with NBC and PBS before returning to Canada in the 1990s, eventually anchoring for CBC Ottawa, CITV in Edmonton, CTV National, CBC National, and Newsworld International.

Prior to the election, she was a CBC Radio newsreader and a CBC Television journalist. She lives in Milton, Ontario with her husband Randy.

== Political career ==
Naidoo-Harris ran in the 2011 provincial election as the Liberal candidate in the riding of Halton. She was defeated by Progressive Conservative incumbent Ted Chudleigh by 3,148 votes. She ran again in the 2014 election against Chudleigh this time defeating him by 5,726 votes.

From 2014 to 2016, she was a Parliamentary Assistant to the Minister of Health and Long-Term Care. On June 13, 2016, she was named Associate Minister of Finance Responsible for the Ontario Retirement Pension Plan. On August 24, 2016 she was transferred from the pension role to a new educational ministerial position responsible for early years and child care. In addition to her role as Minister Responsible for Early Years and Child Care, in January 2017, Minister Naidoo-Harris was also named Minister of the Status of Women. In January 2018, she was named Minister of Education and kept her role as Minister Responsible for Early Years and Child Care.

In 2017, Naidoo-Harris was nominated to run for re-election as the Liberal candidate for the newly formed riding of Milton but was defeated in the 2018 election.

== After politics ==
In August 2019, Naidoo-Harris was appointed as the University of Guelph's Associate Vice-President of Diversity and Human Rights.

== Personal life ==
Her son Galen Naidoo Harris was the Liberal candidate in the 2024 Milton provincial by-election, in which he was defeated by the Progressive Conservative candidate Zee Hamid.

== Electoral history ==
2014 Ontario general election
Party	Candidate	Votes	%	±%
Liberal	Indira Naidoo-Harris	33,724	44.79	+5.66
Progressive Conservative	Ted Chudleigh	27,937	37.10	-7.37
New Democratic	Nik Spohr	9,758	12.96	-0.19
Green	Susan Farrant	2,618	3.48	+1.30
Libertarian	Kal Ghory	916	1.22	–
Family Coalition	Gerry Marsh	346	0.46	-0.04
Total valid votes		75,299	100.0	
Eligible voters		149,633		
Liberal gain from Progressive Conservative		Swing		+6.52
Source: Elections Ontario

2018 Ontario general election: Milton
Party	Candidate	Votes	%	±%	Expenditures
Progressive Conservative	Parm Gill	18,249	41.67	+4.12	$58,739
Liberal	Indira Naidoo-Harris	13,064	29.83	–13.26	$49,410
New Democratic	Brendan Smyth	9,740	22.24	+7.83	$370
Green	Eleanor Hayward	2,200	5.02	+1.44	$81
Libertarian	Benjamin Cunningham	366	0.84	–	none listed
Social Reform	Enam Ahmed	170	0.39	–	none listed
Total valid votes		43,789	99.09		
Total rejected, unmarked and declined ballots		403	0.91		
Turnout		44,192	56.11		
Eligible voters		78,764			
Progressive Conservative notional gain from Liberal		Swing		▲8.69	
Source: Elections Ontario

Wynne ministry, Province of Ontario (2013–2018)
Cabinet posts (3)
Predecessor	Office	Successor
Mitzie Hunter	Minister of Education; 2018 (January - June)	Lisa Thompson
New position	Minister Responsible for Early Years and Child Care; 2016 - 2018	none
Tracy MacCharles	Minister of the Status of Women; 2017 (Note: Styled as Minister of Women's Issues until February 14, 2017) - 2018	Harinder Malhi
