= Ministry of Colleges and Universities =

Government ministry of Ontario, Canada

Ministry of Colleges, Universities, Research Excellence and Security
- French: Ministère des Collèges et Universités, de l’Excellence en recherche et de la Sécurité
- Government of Ontario wordmark

Ministry overview
- Formed: 1964
- Jurisdiction: Province of Ontario
- Headquarters: 438 University Avenue, 5/F Toronto, Ontario M7A 2A5
- Annual budget: C$13,494,526,950 (2026/27 approved estimates)
- Minister responsible: Nolan Quinn, Ministry of Colleges, Universities, Research Excellence and Security
- Website: ontario.ca/page/ministry-colleges-universities-research-excellence-and-security

The Ministry of Colleges, Universities, Research Excellence and Security (French: Ministère des Collèges et Universités, de l’Excellence en recherche et de la Sécurité), formally the Ministry of Training, Colleges and Universities pursuant to its enabling legislation, is the ministry of the Government of Ontario responsible for the regulation and delivery of post-secondary education in Ontario, Canada's most populous province. In addition to administering public laws and policies in the post-secondary education sphere, the ministry acts as the principal source of operating funding for Ontario's 22 public universities, exercises direct oversight authority over the provinces 24 publicly funded vocational colleges, administers financial assistance to Ontario residents undertaking postsecondary education and regulates private career colleges. It was also responsible for apprenticeship and skilled trades regulations prior to 2019.

Created in 1964, the ministry is functionally related to the Ministry of Education, responsible for primary and secondary schools across Ontario, and the Ministry of Labour (and for this purpose, the former Ministry of Skills Development), responsible for policies relating to vocational trainings and regulation of skilled trades. It also shares responsibilities over research and innovation policies with the economic development ministry (and for this purpose, the former Ministry of Research and Innovation). The ministerial portfolio and had been at various times held jointly with some of these ministries by the same minister. For a six-year period between 1993 and 1999, the higher education ministry was merged with the education ministry.

With annual expenditure exceeding ten billion dollars since fiscal year 2021-22, it has been among the five ministries with the largest budget in most years in recent decades. Its fiscal estimates for the fiscal year of 2026-27 consists mainly of $9.8B of operating expenses, which funds Ontario's 24 public colleges and 22 public universities, and student aid.

The minister helming the ministry, Nolan Quinn has held the portfolio since August 2024, and has been styled as the Minister of Colleges, Universities, Research Excellence and Security since March 2025. The ministry has accordingly been operating under its current name since then.

== History ==
In May 1964, the Department of University Affairs Act was enacted, establishing the Department of University Affairs. The department was charged with administering the government's support programs for higher education, previously the responsibility of the education department. Bill Davis, the inaugural minister, was the Minister of Education at the time and continued to hold the position after the department's establishment until his ascension to the premiership in early 1971. In October 1971, the department's size was doubled by the addition of the Applied Arts and Technology Branch of the Department of Education, and was renamed the Department of Colleges and Universities to reflect this expansion of functions. It was renamed the Ministry of Colleges and Universities in 1972 as part of a government-wide restructuring.

In addition to jurisdiction over higher education, the department also had financial jurisdiction over the Royal Ontario Museum, the Royal Botanical Gardens and the Art Gallery of Ontario. In 1975, various cultural programs and institutions of the ministry were transferred to the newly created Ministry of Culture and Recreation.

In 1985, a separate Ministry of Skills Development was created by the short-lived Miller ministry, and for twice very brief period held by a separate minister. (Note: from February to June 1985 by Progressive Conservatives Ernie Eves and then Phil Gillies, and again from September 1987 to August 1989 by Liberal Alvin Curling) In a 1989 move portrayed in the press as the creation of a super ministry, Premier David Peterson assigned responsibilities for all three education related ministries – the Ministry of Colleges and Universities, the Ministry of Education and the Ministry of Skills Development – to Sean Conway. In 1993 the Rae ministry combined the three ministries to form the Ministry of Education and Training. These reorganizations were not formalized with amendment to the ministry's enabling legislation, though the Peterson ministry tabled legislations for the permanent establishment of the skills development ministry in 1986.

In June 1999, the responsibilities for post-secondary education and skills development were again given to a standalone ministry, named the Ministry of Training, Colleges and Universities. Legislative amendments was adopted in 2000 to formalize this change. In the years that follow, the ministry increasely featured as an economic portfolio as successive governments placed increasing emphasis and reliance on the post-secondary education sector as both driver and contributor to Ontario economic growth. The ministy's political leadership reflected this shift, with successing ministers having held related economic portfolios of labour, economic development or research and innvocation immediately before, after, or concurrrently. The ministry was renamed Ministry of Advanced Education and Skills Development in 2016 when Deputy Premier Deb Matthews was appointed its minister, but its function and responsibilities remained substantially the same. The new name, effected by an order-in-council, was never formalized by legislative amendment and was reversed upon the Ford ministry taking office.

In October 2019, Premier Doug Ford assigned the training and skills development portion of the portfolio, with the sensitive responsibilities over skilled trades regulation, to labour minister Monte McNaughton, and this ministry reverted to its former name of Ministry of Colleges and Universities accordingly. The ministry was further renamed to the Ministry of Colleges, Universities, Research Excellence and Security in March 2025. Neither the two name changes nor the transfer of responsibilities over training and skills development had been formalized by legislative amendment.

=== Names operated under ===
The ministry operated under a number of different names since its founding. Its name was changed four times in the six decades 1964 and 2018, and changed three more times since the Ford ministry entered government.

Ministry name	Period in use	Initiating ministry	Effecting authority Actual substantive functions changed?	
Department of University Affairs	1964–1971	Robarts	Enabling legislation	(n/a)
Department / Ministry of Colleges and Universities	1971–1993	Davis	Enabling legislation	Yes
Ministry of Education and Training	1993–1999	Rae	Order-in-Council	Yes
Ministry of Training, Colleges and Universities	1999–2016	Harris	Legislative amendment	Yes
Ministry of Advanced Education and Skills Development	2016–2018	Wynne	Order-in-Council 1337/2016	
Ministry of Training, Colleges and Universities	2018–2019	Ford	Order-in-Council 1161/2018	
Ministry of Colleges and Universities	2019–2025	Ford	Order-in-Council 1788/2019	Yes
Ministry of Colleges, Universities, Research Excellence and Security	2025–present	Ford	Order-in-Council 437/2025	

== Authorities and responsibilities ==
The Minister of Colleges and Universities is a member of the Executive Council of Ontario (or cabinet) appointed by the Premier and accountable to the Legislative Assembly of Ontario. Its deputy minister, the senior civil servant in the ministry, advises the minister and oversees the day-to-day operations of the ministry.

=== Fund public universities ===
The ministry administers the provision of operating grants to Ontario's 22 public universities. This function in recent years accounts for half of the ministry's annual expenditure. (Note: For example, in the ministry's approved expenditure estimates for fiscal year 2027, grants for university operating costs account for $4.97B of the ministry $9.97B total operating expense.) It however does not exercise direct governance over universities, which are each created as autonomous not-for-profit corporate entities. Each public universities is subject to its own separate statute that provides its institutional autonomy and defines individual rules. Instead, the government's directions and priorities are carried out through conditions and performance targets and metrics set out in multi-year funding agreements between the ministry and individual universities.

The ministry also has the formal role of conferring degree granting authorities to universities. This function is carried out by the Ontario Universities Council on Quality Assurance, and independent body is charged with approving all new undergraduate and graduate programs offered by the publicly assisted universities and overseeing the regular audit of each university’s quality assurance processes.

=== Oversee vocational colleges ===
The ministry exercises direct oversight authority over the provinces 24 publicly funded vocational colleges, most of them created by the Ontario government in 1967 as "colleges of applied arts and technology". All public colleges are established as crown agency and are subject to the same statute, the Ontario Colleges of Applied Arts and Technology Act, and the broad operational rules prescribed by the ministry. While individual colleges are governed by their own board of governors under normal circumstances, the minister may intervene and substitute the board of governors' authority or remove the entire board, as it has recently done with Conestoga Colleage in May 2026.

=== Provide financial aid ===
The ministry provide financial assistance to Ontario residents undertaking postsecondary education through the Ontario Student Assistance Program (OSAP), an integrated needs-based financial aid program funded jointly with the federal government and delivered in the form of grants and loans. It also provides bursaries for students belonging to specific demographic groups.

=== Regulate private career colleges ===
The Superintendent of Private Career Colleges, a public servant employed in the ministry, is responsible for the regulation of more than 700 for-profit private career colleges in Ontario. The superintendent serves as the registrar of such private sector operators and exercises the ministry's authority for vocational programs approval. The Private Career Colleges Act vests the superintendent with wide-ranging investigative and enforcement power, which the ministry made use of in dramatic fashion when it shutdown 14 campuses of Everest College in 2015.

=== Steer applied research ===
The ministry encourages research and innovation commercialization through specific research grant awarded to Ontario’s universities, colleges and academic hospitals and by financial support to research institutes.

=== Ministry agencies ===
In addition to the public collages, which are all created as Crown agencies, the ministry is accountable for the following public bodies:

- Higher Education Quality Council of Ontario
- Indigenous Advanced Education and Skills Council
- Intellectual Property Ontario
- Ontario Graduate Scholarship Program Selection Board
- Ontario Research Fund Advisory Board
- Postsecondary Education Quality Assessment Board
- Training Completion Assurance Fund Advisory Board

== Reports ==
=== Rae Report, 2005 ===
The Rae Report, officially titled Ontario: A Leader in Learning, called for deregulation of tuition fees, income-contingent loan repayments, and an increase in public funding.

=== Dean Report, 2015 ===
Senator Tony Dean, a former Secretary of Cabinet of Ontario, was commissioned in late 2014 by then minister Reza Moridi to provide wide-ranging recommendations for the governance, the scope of regulations, and development of the Ontario College of Trades. The report, titled Supporting a strong and sustainable Ontario College of Trades, was tabled in October 2015.

== List of ministers ==
Portrait	Minister	Term of office		Tenure	Ministry Party	Note
Minister of University Affairs						
	Bill Davis	May 14, 1964	March 1, 1971	6 years, 291 days	Robarts PC	(Note: Concurrently Minister of Education)
	John White	March 1, 1971	October 28, 1971	(to be continued)	Davis PC	
Minister of Colleges and Universities					Davis PC	
	John White	October 28, 1971	February 2, 1972	338 days	Davis PC	
	George Albert Kerr	February 2, 1972	September 28, 1972	239 days	Davis PC	
	Jack McNie	September 28, 1972	February 26, 1974	1 year, 151 days	Davis PC	
	James Auld	February 26, 1974	October 7, 1975	1 year, 223 days	Davis PC	
	Harry Parrott	October 7, 1975	August 18, 1978	2 years, 315 days	Davis PC	
	Bette Stephenson	August 18, 1978	February 8, 1985	6 years, 174 days	Davis PC	
	Keith Norton	February 8, 1985	May 17, 1985	98 days	Miller PC	(Note: Ministry of Skills Development was separately instituted on March 22, 1985 with Ernie Eves appointed minister)
	Larry Grossman	May 17, 1985	June 26, 1985	40 days	Miller PC	(Note: Concurrently Minister of Education and Government House Leader) (Note: Skills development portfolio held separately by Phil Gillies)
	Greg Sorbara	June 26, 1985	September 29, 1987	2 years, 95 days	Peterson Liberal	(Note: Concurrently Minister of Skills Development, portfolio held as a separate ministry)
	Lyn McLeod	September 29, 1987	August 2, 1989	1 year, 307 days	Peterson Liberal	(Note: Skills development portfolio held separately by Alvin Curling)
	Sean Conway	August 2, 1989	October 1, 1990	1 year, 60 days	Peterson Liberal	
	Richard Allen	October 1, 1990	February 3, 1993	2 years, 125 days	Rae NDP	
Minister of Education and Training					Rae NDP	
	Dave Cooke	February 3, 1993	June 26, 1995	2 years, 143 days	Rae NDP	
	John Snobelen	June 26, 1995	October 10, 1997	2 years, 106 days	Harris PC	
	David Johnson	October 10, 1997	June 17, 1999	1 year, 250 days	Harris PC	
Minister of Training, Colleges and Universities					Harris PC	
	Dianne Cunningham	June 17, 1999	April 14, 2002	4 years, 127 days	Harris PC	(Note: Also Minister Responsible for Women's Issues (February 8, 2001 – October 22, 2003))
	Dianne Cunningham	April 15, 2002	October 22, 2003	4 years, 127 days	Eves PC	(Note: Also Minister Responsible for Women's Issues (February 8, 2001 – October 22, 2003))
	Mary Anne Chambers	October 23, 2003	June 29, 2005	1 year, 249 days	McGuinty Liberal	
	Chris Bentley	June 29, 2005	October 30, 2007	2 years, 123 days	McGuinty Liberal	
	John Milloy	October 30, 2007	October 20, 2011	3 years, 355 days (first instance)	McGuinty Liberal	
	Glen Murray	October 20, 2011	November 5, 2012	1 year, 16 days	McGuinty Liberal	(Note: Resigned to seek the leadership of the Ontario Liberal Party)
	John Milloy interim	November 5, 2012	February 11, 2013	98 days (total: 4 years and 88 days)	McGuinty Liberal	(Note: Interim minister upon Murray's resignation)
	Brad Duguid	February 11, 2013	June 24, 2014	1 year, 133 days	Wynne Liberal	
	Reza Moridi	June 24, 2014	June 13, 2016	1 year, 355 days	Wynne Liberal	(Note: Concurrently Minister of Research and Innovation)
Minister of Advanced Education and Skills Development					Wynne Liberal	
	Deb Matthews	June 13, 2016	January 17, 2018	1 year, 218 days	Wynne Liberal	(Note: While Deputy Premier, Chair of Cabinet and Minister Responsible for Digital Government)
	Mitzie Hunter	January 17, 2018	June 29, 2018	163 days	Wynne Liberal	
Minister of Training, Colleges and Universities						
	Merrilee Fullerton	June 29, 2018	June 20, 2019	356 days	Ford PC	
	Ross Romano	June 20, 2019	October 21, 2019	(to continue)	Ford PC	
Minister of Colleges and Universities					Ford PC	
	Ross Romano	October 21, 2019	June 18, 2021	1 year, 363 days	Ford PC	
	Jill Dunlop	June 18, 2021	August 16, 2024	3 years, 59 days	Ford PC	
	Nolan Quinn	August 16, 2024	March 19, 2025	(to continue)	Ford PC	
Minister of Colleges, Universities, Research Excellence and Security					Ford PC	
	Nolan Quinn	March 19, 2025	present	2 years, 70 days	Ford PC	

=== Ministers of Skills Development ===
Responsibility over apprenticeship and skilled trades regulations resided with the labour ministry before 1985. The Ministry of Skills Development was created in 1985 and assumed those function. It existed as a separate ministerial portfolio only for a brief period between 1985 and 1993, over the tenure of six colleges and universities ministers, three of them held the portfolio concurrently. It was merged into the higher education portfolio afterward.

In 2019, that portion of the portfolio was assigned by order-in-council to the labour minister, who was also assigned responsibility for immigration. Given that no corresponding legislative amendment had been adopted, the assignment may still be proven transitory in nature.

Portrait	Minister	Term of office		Tenure	Ministry Party	Minister of Colleges & Universities
Part of Labour portfolio (pre-1985)						
Minister of Skills Development						
	Ernie Eves	February 8, 1985	May 17, 1985	98 days	Miller PC	Keith Norton
	Phil Gillies	May 17, 1985	June 26, 1985	40 days	Miller PC	Larry Grossman
	Greg Sorbara	June 26, 1985	September 29, 1987	2 years, 95 days	Peterson Liberal	himself
	Alvin Curling	September 29, 1987	August 2, 1989	1 year, 307 days	Peterson Liberal	Lyn McLeod
	Sean Conway	August 2, 1989	October 1, 1990	1 year, 60 days	Peterson Liberal	himself
	Richard Allen	October 1, 1990	February 3, 1993	2 years, 125 days	Rae NDP	himself
Part of Education and Training portfolio (1993–1999); Part of Training, Colleges and Universities portfolio (1999–2019)						
Minister of Labour, Training and Skills Development						
	Monte McNaughton	October 21, 2019	June 24, 2022	(to continue)	Ford PC	Ross Romano
	Monte McNaughton	October 21, 2019	June 24, 2022	(to continue)	Ford PC	Jill Dunlop
Minister of Labour, Immigration, Training and Skills Development					Ford PC	Jill Dunlop
	Monte McNaughton	June 24, 2022	September 22, 2023	3 years, 336 days	Ford PC	Jill Dunlop
	David Piccini	September 23, 2023	present	3 years, 32 days	Ford PC	Jill Dunlop
	David Piccini	September 23, 2023	present	3 years, 32 days	Ford PC	Nolan Quinn

=== Ministers of Education ===
In addition to the ministry inaugural minister Bill Davis, seven of his successors also held the education portfolio concurrently.

- Bill Davis - 1964–1971
- Bette Stephenson - 1978–1985
- Keith Norton - February–May 1985
- Larry Grossman - May–June 1985
- Sean Conway - 1989–1990
- Dave Cooke (NDP) 1993–1995
- John Snobelen - 1995–1997
- David Johnson - 1997–1999

Three minister had held the education portfolio during a different period

- Sean Conway - 1989–1990, held education portfolio prior 1985–1987
- Mitzie Hunter - January–June 2018, held education portfolio prior 2016–2018
- Jill Dunlop - 2021–2024, held education portfolio afterward 2024–2025

== See also ==
- Higher education in Ontario
