= Laurel Broten =

Canadian politician

The Honourable Laurel Broten ECO

Member of the Ontario Provincial Parliament for Etobicoke—Lakeshore
- In office October 2, 2003 – July 2, 2013
- Preceded by: Morley Kells
- Succeeded by: Doug Holyday

Personal details
- Born: 1967 (age 58–59)
- Party: Liberal
- Spouse: Paul Laberge
- Children: 2
- Occupation: Lawyer

Laurel C. Broten (born c. 1967) is a former politician in Ontario, Canada. She was a Liberal member of the Legislative Assembly of Ontario from 2003 to 2013, who represented the Toronto riding of Etobicoke—Lakeshore. She served in the cabinets of Kathleen Wynne and Dalton McGuinty.

== Background ==
Prior to entering politics, she was a lawyer, community activist, and volunteer. Broten attended McMaster University from 1986 to 1990, and has both a Bachelor of Arts and a Bachelor of Science degree from the institution. She also received an LL.B. from the University of Western Ontario in 1993. She was a law clerk to Madam Justice Claire L'Heureux-Dubé at the Supreme Court of Canada from 1993 to 1994, and later had a practice in civil and commercial litigation. She has also served as chair of the board of directors for the Gatehouse, a community centre for survivors of child abuse.

Broten, her husband, and their two children moved to Halifax, Nova Scotia in 2013.

== Provincial politics ==
Broten ran for the Ontario legislature in the provincial election of 1999 but was defeated by Progressive Conservative Morley Kells in Etobicoke-Lakeshore by 5,156 votes. She ran again in the 2003 election and defeated Kells by 6,722 votes amid a provincial shift to the Liberals.

=== 38th Legislative Assembly ===
On October 23, 2003, she was named as the Parliamentary Assistant to Premier Dalton McGuinty. In this role, she conducted province-wide consultations to develop reforms to address domestic violence in Ontario. This led to the government's Domestic Violence Action Plan which included a public education campaign. She also chaired the Premier's Shared Air Summit, which drew scientists and policymakers from across North America to tackle the linked issues of smog and transboundary air pollution.

She introduced two private member's bills in 2004. The first, entitled Kids First Licences Act, proposed to allow drivers to make charitable donations to children's charities whenever they renewed their vehicle licence. The second, called Workplace Violence and Workplace Harassment (an amendment to the Occupational Health and Safety Act), proposed to impose additional duties and responsibilities in workplaces.

On June 29, 2005, Broten was appointed to cabinet as Minister of the Environment. As minister, she developed policies to reduce greenhouse gas emissions. She also introduced the Clean Water Act designed to better safeguard Ontario's drinking water.

=== 39th Legislative Assembly ===
Broten was re-elected in 2007 and was appointed Parliamentary Assistant to the Minister of Health and Long-Term Care. While there, she authored a report detailing a Five Point Action Plan to create more opportunities and reduce barriers for internationally trained doctors in Ontario. Her report formed the basis for new legislation in 2008.

In 2008, she introduced legislation that imposes a duty to report images of child abuse. The following year, she unanimously passed a resolution calling for a review of reporting standards for listed companies.

In 2009, Broten was appointed Parliamentary Assistant to the Minister of Energy and Infrastructure. On October 7 that year, she was appointed Minister of Children and Youth Services and Minister Responsible for Women's Issues.

=== 40th Legislative Assembly ===
In 2011, Broten was re-elected again. Premier Dalton McGuinty reorganized his cabinet and appointed her as Minister of Education and minister responsible for women's issues.

On February 11, 2013, following a long battle with teachers' unions, Premier Kathleen Wynne appointed her as Minister of Intergovernmental Affairs. Laurel resigned from the cabinet and the legislature on July 2, 2013.

On June 23, 2013, Broten announced that she would be "leaving politics effective July 2nd" and moving to Halifax, Nova Scotia.

=== Cabinet positions ===
Wynne ministry, Province of Ontario (2013–2018)
Cabinet post (1)
Predecessor	Office	Successor
Dalton McGuinty	Minister of Intergovernmental Affairs; 2013; Also Responsible for Women's Issues	Kathleen Wynne
McGuinty ministry, Province of Ontario (2003–2013)
Cabinet posts (4)
Predecessor	Office	Successor
Eric Hoskins	Minister of Children and Youth Services; 2012–2013; Also Responsible for Women's Issues	Teresa Piruzza
Leona Dombrowsky	Minister of Education; 2011–2013; Also Responsible for Women's Issues	Liz Sandals
Deb Matthews	Minister of Children and Youth Services; 2009–2011; Also Responsible for Women's Issues	Eric Hoskins
Leona Dombrowsky	Minister of the Environment; 2005–2007	John Gerretsen

=== Electoral record ===
2011 Ontario general election
Party	Candidate	Votes	%	±%
Liberal	Laurel Broten	22,058	50.8	+4.94
Progressive Conservative	Simon Nyilassy	12,679	29.2	-1.44
New Democratic	Dionne Coley	6,781	15.6	+2.03
Green	Angela Salewsky	1,151	2.7	5.15
Libertarian	Hans Kunov	213	0.5	
Freedom	Mark Brombacher	182	0.4	
Socialist	Natalie Lochwin	137	0.3	
Independent	John Letonja	118	0.3	
Independent	Thane MacKay	113	0.3	
Total valid votes		43,432	100.00	

2007 Ontario general election
Party	Candidate	Votes	%	±%
Liberal	Laurel Broten	20,246	45.86	+1.70
Progressive Conservative	Tom Barlow	13,524	30.64	1.95
New Democratic	Andrea Németh	5,991	13.57	-6.52
Green	Jerry Schulman	3,464	7.85	+6.26
Family Coalition	Bob Williams	464	1.05	-0.03
Independent	Janice Murray	456	1.03	+0.53
Total valid votes		44,145	100.00	

2003 Ontario general election
Party	Candidate	Votes	%	±%
Liberal	Laurel Broten	19,680	44.16	+8.31
Progressive Conservative	Morley Kells	14,524	32.59	-14.39
New Democratic	Irene Jones	8,952	20.09	+5.37
Green	Junyee Wang	708	1.59	
Family Coalition	Ted Kupiec	480	1.08	+0.12
Independent	Janice Murray	225	0.50	-0.18
Total valid votes		44,569	100.00	

1999 Ontario general election
Party	Candidate	Votes	%	±%
Progressive Conservative	Morley Kells	20,602	46.98	+1.75
Liberal	Laurel Broten	15,723	35.85	+6.27
New Democratic	Vicki Obedkoff	6,457	14.72	-10.45
Family Coalition	Kevin McGourty	423	0.96	
Natural Law	Don Jackson	349	0.80	+0.16
Independent	Janice Murray	299	0.68	
Total valid votes		43,853	100.00	

== Post-political career ==
After she resigned from the Ontario Cabinet and legislature, Broten and her family eventually settled in Hammonds Plains, Nova Scotia. She had initially stated that she was moving to Halifax, for her husband Paul obtained a job at Emera as special counsel for senior projects.

Not long after Nova Scotia Premier Stephen McNeil's Liberal Party swept to electoral victory, she was hired as a government consultant to lead a comprehensive review of the taxation in the province. Her final report, released on November 19, 2014, made 22 recommendations on taxation; these included eliminating the tax bracket for high-income ($150,000 and over) earners, eliminating refundable tax credits, eliminating a tax rebate for seniors, reducing corporate taxes for large businesses, introducing a carbon tax and expanding the HST to include numerous exempt products including books, children's clothes, diapers, and feminine hygiene products. Broten's report was generally panned, and Nova Scotia Finance Minister Diana Whalen subsequently scheduled several public consultations across the province in the winter of 2015. On March 25, 2015, Whalen said "every recommendation in the Broten review is [being] looked at", including a carbon tax, but only explicitly ruled out increasing the HST on books and eliminating a volunteer firefighter tax credit.

On January 14, 2015, Broten was selected by the Nova Scotia Business Incorporated (NSBI) board for the position of president and CEO of NSBI. Her initial salary was comparable to that of her predecessor, Stephen Lund.
