= Sandra Pupatello =

Canadian politician

The Honourable Sandra Pupatello ECO
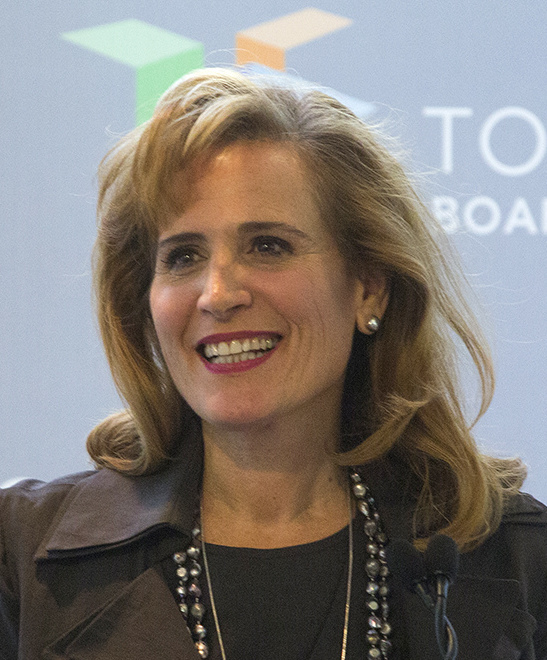
- Pupatello at the Toronto Region Board of Trade in 2013

Canadian Senator from Ontario
- Incumbent
- Assumed office March 7, 2025
- Nominated by: Justin Trudeau
- Appointed by: Mary Simon

Chair of Hydro One
- In office April 1, 2014 – April 16, 2015
- Preceded by: James Arnett
- Succeeded by: David Denison

Member of the Ontario Provincial Parliament for Windsor West (Windsor—Sandwich; 1995–1999)
- In office September 26, 1995 – September 7, 2011
- Preceded by: George Dadamo
- Succeeded by: Teresa Piruzza

Personal details
- Born: Sandra Pizzolitto; October 6, 1962 (age 63) Windsor, Ontario, Canada
- Party: Ontario Liberal Party
- Other political affiliations: Canadian Senators Group (May—September 2025)
- Spouse: Jim Bennett
- Education: University of Windsor

Sandra Pupatello (née Pizzolitto; born October 6, 1962) is a Canadian politician. She was a member of the Legislative Assembly of Ontario from 1995 to 2011 as a member of the Ontario Liberal Party, and served as a cabinet minister in the government of Dalton McGuinty. Since 2025, she is a member of the Senate of Canada. In September 2025, she was appointed chair of the Government Representative's Office in the Senate.

Pupatello ran for the leadership of the Liberal Party of Ontario in 2013; she placed second to Kathleen Wynne. She unsuccessfully ran for the federal Liberal Party in the 2019 and 2021 elections. Pupatello served as chair of Hydro One from 2014 to 2015.

Pupatello is married to Jim Bennett, a former leader of the Newfoundland and Labrador Liberal Party.

== Early life and career ==
Pupatello was born Sandra Pizzolitto in Windsor, Ontario. She became politically active by campaigning for Liberal Member of Parliament (MP) Herb Gray in the 1970s. She holds a Bachelor of Arts degree from the University of Windsor (1986). She remained in the city after her graduation, serving as general manager of the city's Rotary Club and executive director of the Essex County Kidney Foundation of Canada. She was also a board member of the Windsor Regional Hospital and Windsor Regional Children's Centre and was president of the Fogolar Furlan Club. Pupatello was named "Italian of the Year" for Windsor-Essex County in 1996, received the Charlie Clark Award for Outstanding Service from the University of Windsor in 2001, and was named "Windsor Woman of the Year" in 2003.

== Political career ==
Pupatello was first elected to the Ontario legislature in the 1995 provincial election, defeating New Democratic Party candidate Arlene Rousseau by 5,526 votes in Windsor—Sandwich. The seat had previously been held by New Democrat George Dadamo, who did not seek re-election. The Progressive Conservative Party won a majority government in the election, and Pupatello entered the legislature as an opposition Member of Provincial Parliament (MPP). During her first term, she served as Official Opposition Critic for Community and Social Services, Children's Issues, Youth Issues, and the Management Board of Cabinet.

Pupatello was co-manager of Dwight Duncan's 1996 campaign to lead the Ontario Liberal Party. Like Duncan, she supported Gerard Kennedy on the final ballot.

Pupatello was re-elected by a landslide in the 1999 provincial election for the redistributed constituency of Windsor West, while the Progressive Conservatives were re-elected to a second consecutive majority government. Pupatello remained a member of the opposition frontbench, serving over the next four years as Deputy Leader of the Opposition and Official Opposition Critic for Health and Long-Term Care.

She was a vocal critic of the Mike Harris and Ernie Eves governments, frequently criticizing cutbacks to child care and other programs. In 1997, she introduced a Private Member's Resolution intended to stop cutbacks to hospital funding. She later criticized the Progressive Conservative government's plans to introduce a private MRI clinic, arguing that it posed a long-term threat to public health care.

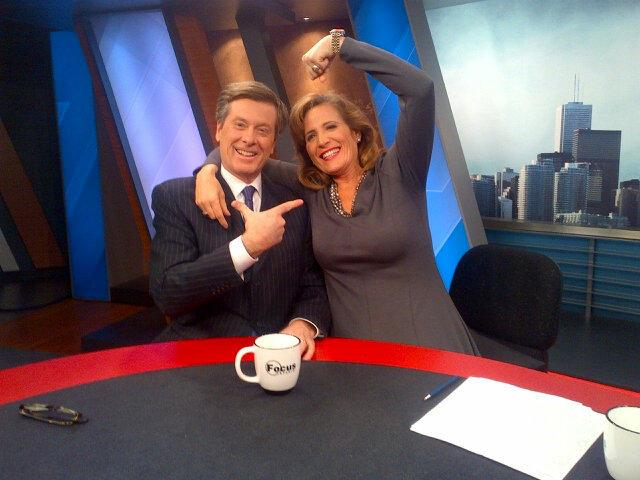
Pupatello with former Progressive Conservative Party of Ontario leader John Tory.

The Liberal Party won a majority government in the 2003 provincial election, and Pupatello was again re-elected in Windsor West with a significant majority. On October 23, 2003, she was appointed to cabinet as Minister of Community and Social Services with responsibility for Women's Issues. There was some speculation that she would be appointed Deputy Premier as well, but this position was instead left vacant until George Smitherman's appointment in 2006. Pupatello was spoken of as a possible candidate for the leadership of the Ontario Liberal Party when Dalton McGuinty was to retire in 2006.

=== Minister of Community and Social Services ===
Pupatello's most important responsibility in the Community and Social Services portfolio was overseeing Ontario's welfare and disability assistance system. Shortly after taking office, she announced that her government would remove a lifetime ban on welfare recipients who are caught cheating on their applications. Pupatello described the rule as counterproductive, in that many welfare officials were reluctant to bring forward charges out of concern for the extreme punitive consequences. She also announced that her government would take greater steps to find parents who are delinquent with child support payments.

In March 2004, Pupatello announced $2 million to assist low-income Ontarians with increased hydro bills. In June, she announced $10 million to help Ontarians with physical disabilities modify their houses and cars.

Pupatello introduced a 3% social assistance rate increase in 2004, the first such increase after twelve years of freezes. Mechanical difficulties with computers purchased by the Mike Harris government subsequently delayed its implementation, and the province implemented lump-sum payments instead. Later in 2004, Pupatello announced that her government would eliminate a rule requiring welfare recipients to liquidate their education savings plans. Speaking to the media, Pupatello described the requirement as "a dumb rule that works at cross-purposes to what welfare is supposed to be doing for people and their families". In 2005, she announced the creation of the JobsNow program to help welfare recipients enter the workforce.

In January 2005, Pupatello was appointed to chair an ad hoc cabinet committee on the modernization of government.

Pupatello spearheaded passage of the Adoption Information Disclosure Act in 2005, allowing birth records to be released to adoptees. Ontario Privacy Commissioner Ann Cavoukian was a critic of the bill, arguing that it was not sufficiently respectful of the promises of anonymity made to birth parents at the time of adoption. Pupatello argued that the bill was necessary to provide adoptees with information about their personal history, and has noted that it provides safeguards for instances where safety issues are a concern.

In November 2005, the Ministry of Community and Social Services, under Pupatello's leadership, rolled out a series of amendments to the special diet allowance, a program which provides additional funding of up to $250 per month for social assistance recipients to cover the increased costs of certain medically related diets. Groups such as the Ontario Coalition Against Poverty had previously encouraged recipients to apply for the benefit and there had been a significant increase in the number of requests. Pupatello argued that there was a loophole in the program, it was being exploited by activist groups and that the resulting drain on the system needed to be corrected. Several anti-poverty groups criticized the decision. In February 2008, the Ontario Human Rights Commission referred a group of complaints to the Human Rights Tribunal of Ontario, asserting that the 2005 amendments violated the Ontario Human Rights Code. The Tribunal hearings are scheduled to take place in 2009.

Pupatello announced in January 2006 that her department would close Ontario's three remaining government-operated institutions for mentally disabled adults, and assist the occupants with moving into more integrated community facilities. She noted that a "sea change in attitude" had occurred over institutionalization practices since the buildings were first established and that greater integration was now the preferred approach. Previous ministers, including John Baird, had also called for the buildings to close. Critics argued that the plan could put the patients at risk.

In March 2006, the McGuinty government was criticized for a backlog in approving provincial disability allowances. Pupatello described the backlog as "totally unacceptable", and announced that her ministry would work to correct it.

Social assistance rates were raised again by 2% in 2006. Pupatello also introduced policy to allow further money to be 'flowed through' from the federal government's National Child Benefit Supplement in each year since 2003. She was unable to implement a planned removal of the federal tax credit clawback and argued that the deficit inherited from the previous government made this change unviable before 2007.

=== Minister of Education ===
Pupatello was promoted to Minister of Education on April 5, 2006, after Gerard Kennedy resigned to run for the federal Liberal leadership. The following month, she announced that her government would give $3 million to the Kids Help Phone service to set up a 24-hour anti-bullying hotline. She also pledged more than $1 million to provide young students with swimming and water survival lessons, in the aftermath of a series of drowning deaths in the Guelph area the previous year.

In late May 2006, Pupatello introduced a strategic high school transition plan intended to reduce Ontario's high-school dropout rate. The following month, she introduced a $50 million plan for teacher training and reduced wait times for special needs programs. She also worked toward solving the vexing issue of the teacher funding formula, a problem that the Liberals inherited from the previous government.

Pupatello also announced a comprehensive plan for changes at TV Ontario, including a greater focus on educational programming and more money for equipment upgrades. The popular Studio 2 program was cancelled, and replaced by a nightly current affairs show called The Agenda. Some opposition politicians charged political interference in the latter decision, but this was denied by both Pupatello and Studio 2 host Steve Paikin.

During the summer of 2006, Pupatello criticized a number of Ontario school boards for failing to balance their books. She appointed a financial adviser to the Dufferin-Peel Catholic District School Board, which was experiencing difficulties balancing its budget. Pupatello also targeted administrative costs in the Toronto District School Board, arguing that the board had the means to balance its books without program cuts. In late August, she appointed two provincial representatives to review the TDSB books.

During a September 2006 by-election Parkdale—High Park, Pupatello engaged in a controversial negative campaign on behalf of Liberal candidate Sylvia Watson. She accused New Democratic Party candidate Rev. Cheri DiNovo of comparing Canada's media coverage of serial killer Karla Homolka to the persecution of Jesus Christ, and suggested that DiNovo was unfit to run for parliament. Many argued that Pupatello took DiNovo's words completely out of context, and opposition politicians accused the Liberals of conducting a smear campaign. The effort backfired, and DiNovo was elected by a significant margin. Pupatello has defended her role in the campaign, saying "If I was presented once again with apparently what is factual and has yet to be refuted and that is sermons that were posted on the world wide web ... I would have exactly the same opinion as I do today".

=== Minister of Economic Development and Trade ===
Pupatello was reassigned as Minister of Economic Development and Trade on September 18, 2006, following the resignation of Joe Cordiano. This was generally interpreted as a demotion, although at least one columnist has suggested that holding an economic portfolio could help Pupatello's long-term political ambitions.

Pupatello led provincial trade delegations to Alberta in late 2006 and early 2007, promoting Ontario's business sector to the western province's booming economy. She also took part in a trade mission to India and Pakistan in January 2007, and went on a four-day trade mission to Japan in April of the same year. Her department has also set up a growing number of marketing centres around the world.

=== Minister Responsible for Women's Issues ===
In late 2005, Pupatello introduced a program to assist provincial emergency workers in identifying cases of domestic abuse. She has also introduced several initiatives to assist women from low-income backgrounds in entering the job market. She introduced "EqualityRules.ca" in November 2006, to encourage equal relationships between young boys and girls. In the same month, she announced $2.1 million for interpreter services for victims of domestic violence.

=== Minister of International Trade and Investment ===
In September 2008, she was appointed the province's Minister of International Trade and Development, which was created with the mandate of attracting new investment in Ontario.

=== Minister of Economic Development and Trade ===
In June 2009, she was appointed the Minister of Economic Development and Trade, a new ministry that combined three previous ministries: Small Business, International Trade and Investment and Economic Development.

In June 2011, she announced that she would not seek re-election in the October 2011 general election.

=== 2013 Ontario Liberal leadership bid ===
On November 8, 2012, Pupatello announced that she would seek the leadership of the Ontario Liberal Party. She was widely seen as the frontrunner in the race, going into the convention with approximately 27% of voting delegates and over a quarter of ex-officio delegates, as well as endorsements from both The Globe and Mail and the Toronto Star. On the day of the convention, Pupatello led on the first two ballots, but lost to Kathleen Wynne on the third and final ballot. Wynne subsequently asked her to become minister of finance in her first cabinet; Pupatello declined in favour of returning to the private sector.

== Post provincal politics ==
Following her retirement from politics, she took a position as director of business and global markets at PricewaterhouseCoopers.

In May 2013, Pupatello was named CEO of the municipally owned Windsor-Essex Economic Development Corporation and occupied that position in addition to her old position at PricewaterhouseCoopers. She resigned in July 2015, despite having two years left in her contract, after months of criticism from some Windsor city councillors who grilled Pupatello over the WEEDC's failure to create jobs in the region.

The provincial government appointed Pupatello to the board of Hydro One, the province's largest electricity company, in November 2013 and subsequently appointed her chair effective April 2014. She was succeeded as chair by David F. Denison on April 16, 2015, but remained on the Hydro One board of directors.

== Federal politics ==
Pupatello supported Paul Martin's bid to succeed Jean Chrétien as leader of the Liberal Party of Canada. She also supported Michael Ignatieff's bid for the party leadership in 2006.

In 2015, there was speculation that she may run for the federal Liberals in Windsor West in the October 2015 federal election and attempt to unseat New Democratic Party (NDP) incumbent Brian Masse, but that did not come to fruition.

Pupatello announced in August 2019 that she was seeking the federal Liberal nomination in Windsor West in the 2019 Canadian federal election. She won the nomination and faced incumbent New Democratic Party MP Brian Masse in the general election, placing second. In July 2021, Pupatello announced her intention to stand for the second time as the Liberal candidate for Windsor West in the 2021 Canadian federal election. She again placed second behind Masse, who expanded his margin of victory.

On March 7, 2025, she was appointed to the Senate of Canada on the advice of Prime Minister Justin Trudeau. On May 20, 2025, she joined the Canadian Senators Group, but left in September to sit as an independent when she was appointed chair of the Government Representative's Office in the Senate.

== Cabinet positions ==
McGuinty ministry, Province of Ontario (2003–2013)
Cabinet posts (6)
Predecessor	Office	Successor
Michael Bryant	Minister of Economic Development and Trade; 2009–2011	Brad Duguid
Ministry created	Minister of International Trade and Investment; 2008–2009	Ministry merged
Joe Cordiano	Minister of Economic Development and Trade; 2006–2008	Michael Bryant
Dianne Cunningham	Minister Responsible for Women's Issues; 2003–2007	Deb Matthews
Gerard Kennedy	Minister of Education; 2006	Kathleen Wynne
Brenda Elliott (Note: Elliott's official title was "Minister of Community, Family and Children's Services". The department was restructured and renamed in 2003. Biographical information from both of these sites has been incorporated into this article.)	Minister of Community and Social Services; 2003–2006	Madeleine Meilleur

== Electoral record ==
=== Federal ===
2021 Canadian federal election: Windsor West
Party	Candidate	Votes	%	±%	Expenditures
New Democratic	Brian Masse	21,702	44.1	+4.0	$88,457.01
Liberal	Sandra Pupatello	13,670	27.9	-8.4	$86,067.85
Conservative	Anthony Orlando	9,436	19.1	—	none listed
People's	Matthew Giancola	4,080	8.0	+6.2	$5,606.67
Marxist–Leninist	Margaret Villamizar	156	0.1	+0.08	$0.00
Total valid votes/expense limit		48,693	99.0	–	$120,365.34
Total rejected ballots		504	1.0		
Turnout		49,197	53.4		
Eligible voters		92,207			
New Democratic hold		Swing		+6.2	
Source: Elections Canada

2019 Canadian federal election: Windsor West
Party	Candidate	Votes	%	±%	Expenditures
New Democratic	Brian Masse	20,800	40.03	-11.32	$105,980.25
Liberal	Sandra Pupatello	18,878	36.33	+11.08	$107,376.65
Conservative	Henry Lau	9,925	19.10	-1.65	–
Green	Quinn Hunt	1,325	2.55	+0.24	–
People's	Darryl Burrel	958	1.84	–	–
Marxist–Leninist	Margaret Villamizar	76	0.15	-0.20	–
Total valid votes/expense limit		51,962	98.93		
Total rejected ballots		560	1.07	+0.46	
Turnout		52,522	55.32	+0.55	
Eligible voters		94,944			
New Democratic hold		Swing		-11.20	
Source: Elections Canada

=== Provincial ===
2007 Ontario general election
Party	Candidate	Votes	%	±%
Liberal	Sandra Pupatello	16,783	50.2%	-12.32%
New Democratic	Mariano Klimowicz	8,560	25.6%	+4.62%
Progressive Conservative	Lisa Lumley	5,668	17.0%	+5.1%
Green	Jason Richard Haney	1,986	5.9%	+2.4%
Family Coalition	Daniel Joseph Dionne	451	1.4%	

2003 Ontario general election: Windsor West
Party	Candidate	Votes	%	Expenditures
Liberal	Sandra Pupatello	21,993	62.51	$60,548.00
New Democratic	Yvette Blackburn	7,383	20.99	$19,508.14
Progressive Conservative	Derek Insley	4,187	11.90	$16,958.37
Green	Cary M. Lucier	1,233	3.50	$5,046.40
Independent Renewal	Enver Villamizar	386	1.10	$0.00
Total valid votes		35,182	100.00	
Rejected, unmarked and declined ballots		317		
Turnout		35,499	43.87	
Electors on the lists		80,924		

1999 Ontario general election: Windsor West
Party	Candidate	Votes	%	Expenditures
Liberal	Sandra Pupatello	24,388	65.50	$36,524.00
Progressive Conservative	David McCamon	6,229	16.73	$18,201.57
New Democratic	Liam McCarthy	5,762	15.48	$32,434.80
Green	Timothy Dugdale	420	1.13	no return filed
Marxist–Leninist	Robert Cruise	270	0.73	$2,023.00
Natural Law	Lynn Tobin	162	0.44	$0.00
Total valid votes		37,231	100.00	
Rejected, unmarked and declined ballots		403		
Turnout		37,634	49.27	
Electors on the lists		76,382		

1995 Ontario general election: Windsor—Sandwich
Party	Candidate	Votes	%	Expenditures
Liberal	Sandra Pupatello	11,940	47.12	$36,803.00
New Democratic	Arlene Rousseau	6,414	25.31	$10,442.27
Progressive Conservative	Joe Durocher	5,704	22.51	$27,112.47
Family Coalition	Earl Amyotte	610	2.41	$3,426.21
Independent	Christine Wilson	410	1.62	$73.28
Natural Law	Ronald F. Bessette	263	1.04	$0.00
Total valid votes		25,341	100.00	
Rejected, unmarked and declined ballots		428		
Turnout		25,769	50.11	
Electors on the lists		51,421		

All electoral information is taken from Elections Ontario. The expenditure figures cited on this page for all elections after 1995 are the Total Candidate's Campaign Expenses Subject to Limitation, and include transfers from constituency associations.
