= Chair of Cabinet (Ontario) =

Position in the Executive Council of the province of Ontario

Chair of Cabinet is a position in the Executive Council (cabinet) of the province of Ontario. The current Chair of Cabinet is Vic Fedeli. It is a ministerial position without portfolio, although occupants typically have concurrent appointment to another cabinet position.

== List of ministers ==
- Claude Bennett February 8, 1985–June 26, 1985 (Miller Ministry)
- Dwight Duncan 2003–2007 (McGuinty Ministry)
- Kathleen Wynne 2007–2008 (McGuinty Ministry)
- Gerry Phillips 2008–2011 (McGuinty Ministry)
- Rick Bartolucci 2011–2013 (McGuinty Ministry)
- Linda Jeffrey 2013–2014 (Wynne Ministry)
- John Gerretsen 2014 (Wynne Ministry)
- Jim Bradley 2014–2016 (Wynne Ministry)
- Deb Matthews 2016–2018 (Wynne Ministry)
- Helena Jaczek 2018–2018 (Wynne Ministry)
- Vic Fedeli 2018–present (Ford Ministry)

== See also ==
- Premier (Canada)
- List of Ontario premiers
- Executive Council of Ontario
