= Ontario Retirement Pension Plan =

Abandoned social insurance program for Ontario, Canada

The Ontario Retirement Pension Plan (ORPP) was a proposed social insurance program for Ontario, Canada to complement the national Canada Pension Plan. It was intended to cover the 3.5 million workers in Ontario who would not receive a comparable workplace pension after their retirement. Plans to implement the ORPP were cancelled in 2016 following an agreement between the federal government and the provinces to expand the Canada Pension Plan.

== Initial framework (2015) ==
The ORPP was a major plank in the 2014 election platform of the Ontario Liberal Party, and introductory legislation received Royal assent in May 2015.

In August 2015, it was explained that the plan had several specific goals:

1. It is designed to provide up to 15 per cent of a retiree's pre-retirement income as an annual pension, adding about the same amount as the Canada Pension Plan (CPP) for those who have contributed to both plans.
2. Employees and employers would each contribute 1.9 per cent of an employee's income up to a maximum of $90,000 of income per year.
3. Employees who have either an employer-sponsored defined benefit pension plan, or a defined contribution pension plan which requires contributions of at least 8% of pay (half provided by the employers), will be exempt from participating in the ORPP.
4. The program may be cancelled if the CPP is enhanced by the federal government

Enrolment in the ORPP had been planned to be staged in four waves:

Anticipated rollout of ORPP (at February 2016)
Wave	Class	Contribution rate (by each of employer and employee)				
Wave	Class	2017	2018	2019	2020	2021
Wave 1	Large employers (500 or more employees) without comparable workplace pension plans	0.8%	1.6%	1.9%	1.9%	1.9%
Wave 2	Medium employers (approximately 50- 499 employees) without comparable workplace pension plans	–	0.8%	1.6%	1.9%	1.9%
Wave 3	Small employers (50 or fewer employees) without comparable workplace pension plans	–	–	0.8%	1.6%	1.9%
Wave 4	Employers with a workplace pension plan that requires modifications to meet the comparability test, as well as employees who are not members of their workplace's comparable plan	–	–	–	1.9%	1.9%

== Introduction of detailed legislation ==
As required under the 2015 Act, a bill providing greater detail on the operation of the plan was introduced in the Legislative Assembly of Ontario on April 14, 2016. It revealed that the ORPP's implementation was to delayed by one year (with Waves 1 and 2 happening simultaneously), although final rollout was expected to be completed by 2020.

Among the key points of the plan:

- An employer is required to contribute to the ORPP with respect to all employees who are required to contribute it.
- An employee is required to contribute with respect to any employment on which he is not covered by a "workplace pension plan that is comparable to the ORPP", but an employer with a comparable plan may elect to opt into the plan in circumstances prescribed by regulations.
- Only employees who report to work at an establishment in Ontario, or who are paid from an establishment in Ontario.
- Employment in the federal government is exempt.
- Employees who are under 18 years of age or over 70 years, and those receiving an ORPP pension (other than a pension to a surviving spouse), are exempt.
- Earnings exempt from income tax under a tax treaty are exempt.
- Employment of an Indian on an Indian reserve is exempt, except where both the employer and employee have elected to opt into the plan.
- Employment may be exempted on religious grounds, where an application is made and prescribed conditions have been met.
- Contributions are to be made where earnings have exceeded a minimum threshold for a pay period, and continue until a maximum annual earnings threshold is reached (initially set at $90,000).
- Lump sum payments shall be made on the death of a member where he has not yet started to draw a pension, as well as upon application when his expected life expectancy is less than two years and where the amount of a pension is below the prescribed threshold.
- In the event of a relationship breakdown, contributions may be divided and reallocated between the separating spouses.
- Payments from the ORPP will not commence until 2022.

== Implications ==
There was great debate as to the impact and desirability of the proposed plan. Questions were raised as to the motivation behind its creation, suggesting that retirement concerns are less significant than the need to raise funds for the Province's infrastructure plans. Premier Kathleen Wynne admitted that the Province had no idea how much it will cost to run it, while Leader of the Opposition Patrick Brown had promised to abolish the Plan and refund all contributions if the Progressive Conservative Party of Ontario won the next provincial election.

Opinions varied widely on the plan. While the chief executive officer of OPTrust has stated that "[t]he ORPP is good public policy," it has also been described as "a cautionary example of what happens when we use blunt tools to address poorly defined problems." The contributions expected to be collected from participants are seen to be relatively small compared to other retirement plans, as one-third of the targeted workforce will make less than $15,000 per annum and almost one-half of these will be under the age of 25. This group was already seen as being adequately covered by the current Canada Pension Plan and Old Age Security.

Employers were urged to review the retirement arrangements they have in effect for their employees, as there was a risk that some will not qualify as "comparable workforce pension plans" (CWPP) for the purposes of the ORPP. Defined benefit plans will qualify only where they have an annual benefit accrual rate of at least 0.5 per cent of the member's annual remuneration, and defined contribution plans must have a minimum contribution rate of 8 per cent of the member's annual remuneration (with at least 4 per cent being the employer's share).

The following areas were identified as being special concerns:

- What measures need to be taken to ensure that a pension plan is determined to be a CWPP?
- As employees who are excluded from participating in a plan (because of waiting periods, voluntary membership or being beyond the scope of coverage) will still be subject to ORPP contributions, should coverage be extended to include them?
- How many employees will be subject to the ORPP, even where there is a CWPP?
- Where an employer is part of a multi-employer pension plan, how does it obtain assurances that that plan will be a CWPP?
- If an employer has offered a deferred profit sharing plan and/or a group registered retirement savings plan to its employees, should it continue with them or make modifications?
- For other retirement arrangements in effect, should they be replaced with a CWPP?
