= CivicAction =

Canadian non-profit organization

The Greater Toronto CivicAction Alliance (formerly the Toronto City Summit Alliance), commonly known as CivicAction, is a non-profit, non-partisan organization based in Toronto that attempts to boost civic engagement and address urban challenges in the Greater Toronto and Hamilton Area (GTHA).

== Organization ==
CivicAction was created by David Pecaut following a 2002 summit of business and community leaders. Pecaut led a 40-member committee that generated Enough Talk: An Action Plan for the Toronto Region, which provided the roadmap for the organization's focus on issues where there was consensus for action and where it felt progress could be made quickly. CivicAction adopted its current name in December 2010.

Following Enough Talk, the committee formed The Toronto Summit Alliance on October 8, 2003, in an attempt to tackle specific social and economic challenges.

The CivicAction Leadership Foundation is the charitable arm of CivicAction and was launched in 2017. It is a registered charity with its own Board of Directors.
