= 2013 Ontario Liberal Party leadership endorsements =

2013 Ontario Liberal Party leadership election
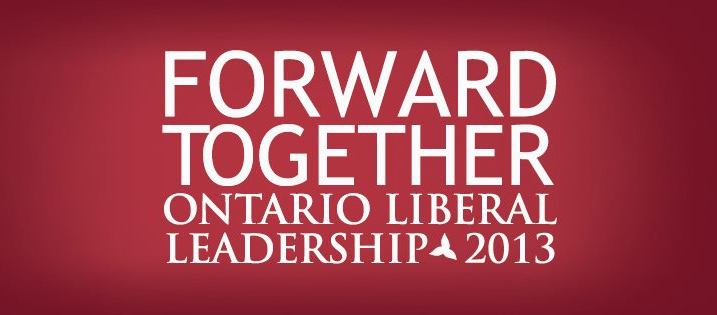
- Date: January 26, 2013
- Convention: Maple Leaf Gardens, Toronto (Mattamy Athletic Centre, Ryerson University)
- Resigning leader: Dalton McGuinty
- Won by: Kathleen Wynne
- Ballots: 3
- Candidates: 7
- Entrance fee: $50,000
- Spending limit: $500,000

This is a list of notable individuals and entities who formally provided endorsements to candidates during the 2013 Ontario Liberal Party leadership election, or had their expression of support reported in the media. That leadership contest elected Kathleen Wynne as leader of the Ontario Liberal Party at a leadership covnention held in Toronto on January 26, 2013, leading to her becoming the first women premier of Ontario and the first out LGBT first minister in Canada two weeks later on February 11, 2013.

This list only includes individuals who held public elected offices, or individuals/entities of prominence sufficient for their expression of support to be reported by news media. Titles or offices held listed are current as of January 26, 2013.

== Endorsements by caucus members ==
=== Incumbent provincial caucus ===
As typical in leadership contests of the two main political parties in Canada and other countries with government based on the Westminster model, the public support of the approximately 50 incumbent caucus members were frequently cited in press reports and pundit commentary as indication of organizational strength, making them by default the endorsements most prized by the contestants. An unique additional dynamic for this contest was the fact that it occurred while the party was in power. Endorsements by sitting cabinet ministers received more press coverage, giving them heightened potency in momentum building. Such endorsements also inferred likelihood of significant organizational reinforcement (though not always proven true) and potentially financial support. This was only the second leadership contest held by the Ontario Liberal Party while in power, and the first to take place in normal course. (Note: The first such contest was the dramatic 1943 contest, held while the party was already in an all-out crisis triggered by the outgoing leader's failed attempt at installing his preferred successor.)

Pupatello led the pack on this front throughout the campaign, kickstarted the campaign with the endorsement of three cabinet heavyweights, deputy premier and finance minister Dwight Duncan, transportation minister Bob Chiarelli and northern development minister Rick Bartolucci. The prominence of the endorsers immediately placed Pupatello among the top-tier contenders. The endorsements were rich with symbolism. They conveyed support coverage from all corner of the province (with Duncan being from Windsor, Chiarelli from Ottawa, Bartolucci from Sudbury, their endorsements having been released along with three additional MPPs, one each from Thunder Bay, Windsor, Ottawa) and inferred closing of ranks of both supporters and former rivals of the outgoing leader (Duncan's 1996 leadership bid was chaired by Pupatello and was the top former leadership rival of McGuinty remaining in caucus, while Chiarelli was the most senior backer of McGuinty's leadership bid remaining in caucus). She quickly established an insurmountable lead with 11 endorsements from caucus within the first two weeks of campaign launch, and entered the convention with support from 24 sitting Liberal MPPs, including ten of the seventeen incumbent cabinet members.

Pupatello's rival struggled to catch up on this score, together having secured only 20 caucus endorsements (Note: discounting the contestant themselves) among them. Wynne launched her bid with support from labour minister Linda Jeffrey and three other MPPs, and followed with the backing of Attorney General John Gerretsen two days later. Her campaign received its two biggest boost when health minister Deb Matthews, previously seen as a likely contender, announced her endorsement and stepped into the role of campaign chair in late November, and when rival Murray withdrew and throw his support to Wynne days before party members cast their local ballots. She entered the convention with ten caucus supporters, four of them incumbent cabinet ministers. Kennedy's weak showing on this score foreshadowed his lackluster performance in this contest. Unlike his 1996 bid or his 2006 federal leadership bid, both backed by a respectable contingent of prominent incumbent and former caucus members, his 2013 bid received endorsements from only four low-profile perpetual backbenchers. Hoskins was the only other contestant with cabinet endorsement, having secured the backing of Margarett Best and two other relatively newer MPPs. Sousa entered the convention backed by two MPPs, both from Scarborough.

=== Former caucus members, federal caucus members ===
Beyond the endorsement of incumbent caucus members, the most recognizable and readily quantifiable endorsers were the sitting Liberal MPs representing Ontario electoral districts, and the former Liberal MPPs and MPs in Ontario. Competition for endorsements from these groups were also rigorous in 2013. Sitting Liberal MPs and former MPPs were particularly valuable endorsers as they were voting delegates ex officio those positions, and a good number of them also carry recent ministerial titles. With a few exceptions, the endorsements of former MPPs and former MPs generally received minimal press coverage, if any. The campaigns nonetheless aggressive leveraged these endorsements with certain journalists, on social media and in communications targeting party members, especially those with longer history of engagement.

With the historic defeat suffered by the federal Liberals in the 2011 federal election, however, there were only 11 Liberal MPs in Ontario at the time. Only three of them–John McCallum, Kirsty Duncan and Ted Hsu–provided their endorsements, respectively to Sandra Pupatello, Gerard Kennedy and Kathleen Wynne. Former Liberal MPs were generally not ex officio delegates. (Note: Former federal party leaders residing in Ontario were entitled to voting delegate status automatically. Former prime minister John Turner (endorsed Hoskins) and former foreign minister Bill Graham (endorsed Wynne) attended the convention as such.) Wynne was further endorsed by two incumbent Liberal senators.

Wynne led the pack on securing such party luminaries, having secured the endorsements of 21 former MPPs (including 3 that were also former MPs), 6 additional former MPs. The most prominent among this group were former party leaders Stuart Smith and Lyn MacLeod (MacLeod being the first woman to lead a major party in Ontario), former Deputy Prime Minister Sheila Copps (who was also a former MPP) and prominent federal ministers Bill Graham and David Collenette. Pupatello posted a strong second, with endorsement from 14 former MPPs and two additional MPs, among them were some of the most influential ministers of the Peterson ministry–Bob Nixon, Sean Conway, Elinor Caplan, Murray Elston, and they were join by Jim Bradley who was still in caucus at the time. Kennedy was backed by three original members of the McGuinty ministry, two of them raised much eyebrows. Former deputy premier George Smitherman, the first openly gay member of the Ontario legislature, withheld his support from the first viable openly gay contender, while Joe Cordiano, the 1996 convention kingmaker who clinched the nearly secured victory from Kennedy, opted to offer his support to an erstwhile rival.

=== Regional dynamic ===
A fundamental premise in leadership contests of the two main parties in Ontario and their federal cousins is equal weighting of input among all electoral districts regardless of membership size or number of votes cast. For that reason, endorsers who had represented or had significant influence in regions the Liberals has not fared well in recent years (and thus had relatively small Liberal Party membership roll) were seen as particularly valuable.

With the Liberals having suffered heavy losses in northern, rural southwestern, and rural eastern Ontario at the most recent election, the endorsements from these regions were particularly sought after and given prominence as they inferred a contestant' capacity in recapturing recently lost grounds. The fact that six of the seven contestants hailed from Toronto or the neighboring Mississauga also put a heightened focus on the contestants' ability to connect with party members and voters beyond the Greater Toronto Area. Wynne, widely seen as the primary challenger to frontrunner and sole non-GTA contender Pupatello, in particular made a concerted push in highlighting endorsements from a wide array of endorsers from outside of the GTA to dispel the perceptions of her appealing to only Toronto urban voters.

=== Relevance of endorsements ===
The rigorous competition for endorsements during this contest forecasted the first ballot strength of the contenders with reasonably good accuracy. The contest for endorsement was primarily between Pupatello and Wynne, the two frontrunners, with Pupatello leading by a wide margin initially and Wynne closing the gap in later phase of the campaign by securing substantially more endorsements from former MPPs and former MPs than the rest of the contestants. Kennedy's distant third place was also reflected by the comparatively modest and underwhelming list of endorsers compared to his two previous leadership bids. The competition for endorsements however failed to forecast the easily foreseeable strength of Tahkar, who secured a solid fourth place finish by leveraging his extensive network in the South Asian community.

While endorsements from former MPPs and former MPs received substantially less press attention, their organization impact were in some case very apparent, especially in electoral district held by opposition parties. Majority of the "clear wins" secured by any of the contestants could be attributed back to prominent endorsers.

- Pupatello secured eight or more delegates (50% or more local support) in 18 districts, 13 of them were held by her caucus supporters, one was leader McGuinty's district, the remain four opposition held district, two where she was endorsed by a former caucus member.
- Wynne secured eight or more delegates in 16 districts, six of them were held by her caucus supporters (including herself), six were opposition-held districts where she was endorsed by a former MPP or a former MP, the remaining four were opposition-held districts, three of which she had the backing of the most recent Liberal candidates.
- Sousa secured eight or more delegates in six districts, including all three represented by himself and his two caucus supporters, plus opposition-held Davenport where he was endorsed by local councillor Ana Bailão.

While the endorsement of incumbent caucus members in most cases meant local boosts, the sizes of the boosts varied widely. The boost from GTA caucus endorsements were generally modest compared to those outside of GTA. In areas with large and organized ethno-cultural communities, such as Peel Region or Scarborough, the impact of caucus endorsement were in some case embarrassingly negligible. In some instances, caucus endorsers simply failed to deliver:

- Takhar secured eight or more delegates in eight districts, neither his home riding nor the former riding of his only endorser were among them. Among the eight district, three were held by caucus supporters of rivals: Etobicoke North (held by Kennedy supporter Shafiq Qaadri), Mississauga Brampton South (held by Hoskins supporter Amrit Mangat) and Guelph (held by Wynne supporter Liz Sandals)
- Hoskins secured eight or more delegates in only one district, Haldimand-Norfolk where he grew up, ran federally, and was endorsed by former MP Bob Speller. He however failed to win his own constituency of St. Paul's. Wynne won the district despite having issued communications to encourage her own supporters residing in the district to vote for Hoskins
- Pupatello won four or less delegates (25% local support or less) in six districts held by her caucus endorsers, including two held by cabinet ministers. Wynne suffered the same fate in three districts held by her supporters, including one held by a cabinet member. Similarly, two of Kennedy's and two of Hoskins caucus endorsers also delivered four or less delegates from their home district, while their other supporters delivered some of the best results for their campaigns.

==== Endorsements tallies ====
The tallies in the following tables exclude:

- endorsers who were affiliated with a rival party while in office
- endorsers represented constituencies outside of Ontario
- endorsers who were neither MPPs nor MPs

Contestant	MPPs		MPs (Note: including senators)	
Contestant	Former	Current	Former	Current
Total available	~160	53	~200	11
Eric Hoskins	3	4 (Note: contestant included in the count)	2	-
Gerard Kennedy	5	4	-	1
Sandra Pupatello	14	24	2 (+2) (Note: Two additional former MPs already counted under firner MPP)	1
Charles Sousa	-	3	1	-
Harinder Takhar	-	1	1	-
Kathleen Wynne	21	11	6 (+5) (Note: 3 additional former MPs who were also former MPP and counted as such; 1 additional former MPs who was an incumbent senator; plus 1 former senator)	1(+2) (Note: plus two incumbent senators)
withdrawn and other info
Glen Murray	1	2	(+1) (Note: One former MPs already counted under firner MPP)	-
did not endorse	unknown	5 (Note: Dalton McGuinty (Premier, outgoing leader), Yasir Naqvi (party president), Steven Del Duca (convention chair), Dave Levac (Speaker of the Legislative Assembly), Chris Bentley)	unknown	8

Contestant	Home Region	Southwest		Central		Toronto		North		East	
Contestant	Home Region	Ex	In	Ex	In	Ex	In	Ex	In	Ex	In
Contestant	Relative weight	20%		35%		20%		10%		15%	
Eric Hoskins	Toronto	1			1	3	3			1	
Gerard Kennedy	Toronto	1		1	3	3	2				
Sandra Pupatello	Southwest	5	3	4	5	3 (Note: Elinor Caplan counted under Central region)	6		4	4	5
Charles Sousa	Central			1	1		2				
Harinder Takhar	Central			1	1						
Kathleen Wynne	Toronto	2	2	12	3	12	5	4			4
Withdrawn
Glen Murray	Toronto			1	1		1				

=== Endorsement lists ===
Endorsements are grouped together by contestant and then by endorser categories, and are each sortable by names, geographical regions, or the constituencies the endorsers represented.

Municipal offices previously held by MPs and MPPs endorsers are generally omitted (with exception for selected offices of comparable or greater significance, such as mayoralty of major cities).

Endorsements were assigned to one of five regions basing on the constituency they represented or hailed from. The regional assignments are informal and included for ease of review and sorting only. The "weight" of the region, calculated by number of electoral districts are also included for reference. For the 2023 contest, the southwestern region and the City of Toronto (treated as a region) each accounted for approximately 20%, the northern region 10%, the eastern region 15%, and the central region accounted for the remaining 35% of the points available.

Code	Region	%	Note
North	North	10%	Nipissing and north
East	East	15%	Northumberland and east
Cen	Central	35%	Hamilton to Durham
Tor	Toronto	20%	City of Toronto
SW	Southwest	20%	West of Grand River (Note: Inclusive Wellington and Grey counties, which are mostly east and north of Grand River)

Current	Former	Endorser Type
MPP	exMPP	Members of Provincial Parliament
MP	exMP	Members of Parliament or Senators
City	exCity	Municipal elected officials
Other		Party wide prominence or received media coverage
*	*	Non-Ontario or non-Liberal MPs/MPPs

== Eric Hoskins ==
Type	Reg	Endorser	Constituency represented	Other roles held, notes	Ref
MPPs
MPP	Tor	Margarett Best	Scarborough—Guildwood since 2007	Minister of Consumer Services (cabinet minister since 2007)	
MPP	Cen	Amrit Mangat	Mississauga—Brampton South since 2007		
MPP	Tor	Tracy MacCharles	Pickering—Scarborough East since 2011		
Former MPPs:
exMPP	Tor	Alvin Curling	Scarborough North / Rouge River 1985–05	Cabinet minister 1985–89; Speaker 2003–05	
exMPP	Tor	Roy McMurtry	Eglinton 1975–85	Progressive Conservative Attorney General 1975–85	
exMPP	Tor	Dianne Poole	Eglinton 1987–95		
exMPP	Tor	Bob Wong	Fort York 1987–90	Cabinet minister 1987–90	
Former MPs
exMP	SW	Bob Speller	Haldimand—Norfolk—Brant, 1988–2004	Federal cabinet minister 2003–04	
exMP	East	John Turner	Ottawa—Carleton 1968–76; St. Lawrence—St. George, QC 1962–68	Prime Minister 1984, Federal cabinet minister 1967–75	
Other prominent individuals
Other		Mike Eizenga		Party president 1995–97, Liberal Party of Canada president 2003–06	
Other		K'naan		rapper, singer-songwriter and filmmaker	
Other		Raine Maida		singer-songwriter	
Other		Gord Phaneuf		Party president 2006–09	
References for endorsements of Eric Hoskins

== Gerard Kennedy ==
Type	Reg	Endorser	Constituency represented	Other roles held, notes	Ref
MPPs
MPP	Cen	Kim Craitor	Niagara Falls since 2003		
MPP	Cen	Bob Delaney	Mississauga—Streetsville since 2003		
MPP	Cen	Vic Dhillon	Brampton West since 2003		
MPP	Tor	Shafiq Qaadri	Etobicoke North since 2003		
Former MPPs
ExMPP	Tor	Joseph Cordiano	York South—Weston 1985–06	Cabinet minister 2003–06	
ExMPP	Cen	Kuldip Kular	Bramalea—Gore—Malton 2003–11		
ExMPP	SW	Steve Peters	Elgin—Middlesex—London 1999–2011	Cabinet minister 2003–07; Speaker 2007–11	
ExMPP	Tor	George Smitherman	Toronto Centre 1999–10	Cabinet minister 2003–10	
MPs
MP	Tor	Kirsty Duncan	Etobicoke North since 2008		
References for endorsements of Gerard Kennedy

== Sandra Pupatello ==
Type	Reg	Endorser	Constituency represented	Other roles held, notes	Ref
MPPs
MPP	Tor	Laura Albanese	York South—Weston since 2007		
MPP	Tor	Bas Balkissoon	Scarborough—Rouge River since 2005		
MPP	North	Rick Bartolucci	Sudbury since 1995	Minister of Northern Development and Mines (cabinet minister since 2003)	
MPP	Cen	Jim Bradley	St. Catharines since 1975	Minister of the Environment (cabinet minister since 2003 and 1985–90)	
MPP	Tor	Laurel Broten	Etobicoke—Lakeshore since 2003	Minister of Education (cabinet minister since 2009, 2005–07)	
MPP	Tor	Donna Cansfield	Etobicoke Centre since 2003	Cabinet minister 2005–10	
MPP	Cen	Michael Chan	Markham—Unionville since 2006	Minister of Tourism (cabinet minister since 2006)	
MPP	East	Bob Chiarelli	Ottawa West—Nepean since 2010, 1987–97	Minister of Transportation (cabinet minister since 2010)	
ExCity	East	Bob Chiarelli	Ottawa Mayor 2001–06	Ottawa–Carleton Reginal Chair 1997–2001	
MPP	Tor	Mike Colle	Eglinton—Lawrence since 1995	Cabinet minister 2005–07	
ExCity	Tor	Mike Colle	Metro Toronto Councillor 1988–94	Toronto Transit Commission chair 1991–94	
MPP	East	Grant Crack	Glengarry—Prescott—Russell since 2011		
MPP	Cen	Dipika Damerla	Mississauga East—Cooksville since 2011		
MPP	Cen	Joe Dickson	Ajax—Pickering since 2003		
MPP	Tor	Brad Duguid	Scarborough Centre since 2003	Minister of Economic Development and Innovation (cabinet minister since 2007)	
MPP	SW	Dwight Duncan	Windsor—Tecumseh since 1995	Deputy Premier; Minister of Finance (cabinet minister since 2003)	
MPP	North	Michael Gravelle	Thunder Bay—Superior North since 1995	Minister of Natural Resources (cabinet minister since 2007)	
MPP	Cen	Helena Jaczek	Oak Ridges—Markham since 2007		
MPP	Tor	Monte Kwinter	York Centre since 1985	Cabinet minister 1985–90, 2003–07	
MPP	East	Jeff Leal	Peterborough since 2003		
MPP	North	Bill Mauro	Thunder Bay—Atikokan since 2003		
MPP	East	Phil McNeely	Ottawa—Orléans since 2003		
MPP	SW	John Milloy	Kitchener Centre since 2003	Minister of Community and Social Services & Government House Leader (cabinet minister since 2003)	
MPP	East	Madeleine Meilleur	Ottawa—Vanier since 2003	Minister of Community Safety and Correctional; Services (cabinet minister since 2003)	
MPP	North	David Orazietti	Sault Ste. Marie since 2003		
MPP	SW	Teresa Piruzza	Windsor West since 2011		
MPP		Picked up after first ballot: Amrit Mangat (Mississauga—Brampton South); Harinder Takhar (Mississauga—Erindale)			
Former MPPs
ExMPP	East	Don Boudria	Prescott and Russell 1981–84		
ExMP	East	Don Boudria	Glengarry–Prescott–Russell 1984–2006	Federal cabinet minister 1996–2003	
ExMPP	East	Sean Conway	Renfrew North/Renfrew—Nipissing—Pembroke 1975–03	Cabinet minister 1985–90	
ExMPP	Tor	David Caplan	Don Valley East 1997–2011	Cabinet minister 2003–09	
ExMPP	Tor	Elinor Caplan	Oriole 1985–97	Cabinet minister 1985–86, 87–1990	
ExMP	Cen	Elinor Caplan	Thronhill 1997–2004	Federal cabinet minister 1999–2003; Note: Initially endorsed Glen Murray	
ExMPP	Cen	Eric Cunningham	Wentworth North 1975–84		
ExMPP	SW	Murray Elston	Huron—Bruce 1981–94	Cabinet minister 1985–90; interim party leader 1992	
ExMPP	SW	Pat Hoy	Chatham-Kent—Essex 1995–11		
ExMPP	East	Jean-Marc Lalonde	Glengarry—Prescott—Russell 1995–11		
ExMPP	SW	Carol Mitchell	Huron—Bruce 2003–11	Agriculture minister 2010–11	
ExMPP	Tor	Tim Murphy	St. George—St. David 1993–95	Party president 1998–99, PMO Chief of staff 2003–06	
ExMPP	SW	Robert Nixon	Brant/Brant—Oxford—Norfolk/Brant—Haldimand 1962–91	Deputy Premier 1987–90; Treasurer 1985–90, party leader 1966–76; 1981–82; 1990–91 (Note: 1966–67, 1981–82, 1990–91 as interim leader)	
ExMPP	East	Richard Patten	Ottawa Centre 1987–90, 1995–2007	Cabinet minister 1987–90	
ExMPP	Cen	Mario Racco	Thornhill 2003–07		
MPs
MP	Cen	John McCallum	Markham—Unionville since 2000	Cabinet minister 2002–06 (Note: again 2015–17)	
Former MPs
ExMP	Cen	Belinda Stronach	Newmarket—Aurora 2004–08 (as Conservative 2004–05)	Cabinet minister 2005–06	
ExMP	Tor	Joe Volpe	Eglinton—Lawrence 1988–11	Cabinet minister 2003–06; 2006 federal Liberal leadership contestant	
ExMP		Picked up after first ballot: John Turner (Prime Minister 1984)			
Municipal politicians
City	SW	Gary McNamara	Mayor of Tecumseh		
City	Cen	Frank Scarpitti	Mayor of Markham		
References for endorsements of Sandra Pupatello

== Charles Sousa ==
Type	Reg	Endorser	Constituency represented	Other roles held, notes	Ref
MPPs
MPP	Tor	Lorenzo Berardinetti	Scarborough Southwest since 2003		
MPP	Tor	Soo Wong	Scarborough—Agincourt since 2011		
Formal federal politicians
ExMP	Cen	John David Maloney	Welland 1993–2008		
Municipal politicians
City	Tor	Ana Bailão	Toronto city councillor, Ward 18 Davenport		
City	Cen	Hazel McCallion	Mississauga Mayor	Note: Later moved across convention floor to support Wynne	
City	SW	Frank Monteiro	Cambridge city councillor, Ward 7		
Other prominent individuals
Other	Cen	Indira Naidoo-Harris		Journalist and past Liberal candidate	
Other	Cen	Nerene Virgin		Journalist, actress and past Liberal candidate	
References for endorsements of Charles Sousa

== Harinder Takhar ==
Type	Reg	Endorser	Constituency represented	Other roles held, notes	Ref
Municipal officials
City	Cen	Bonnie Crombie	Mississauga city councillor, Ward 5		
ExMP	Cen	Bonnie Crombie	Mississauga–Streetsville 2008–11		
References for endorsements of Harinder Takhar

== Kathleen Wynne ==
Type	Reg	Endorser	Constituency represented	Other roles held, notes	Ref
MPPs
MPP	Tor	Michael Coteau	Don Valley East since 2011		
MPP	East	John Gerretsen	Kingston and the Islands since 1995	Attorney General (cabinet minister since 2003) 1996 leadership contestant	
ExCity	East	John Gerretsen	Kingston Mayor 1980–88		
MPP	Cen	Linda Jeffrey	Brampton—Springdale since 2003	Minister of Labour (cabinet minister since 2010)	
MPP	SW	Deb Matthews	London North Centre since 2003	Minister of Health (cabinet minister since 2007)	
MPP	Cen	Ted McMeekin	Ancaster—Dundas—Flamborough—Westdale since 2000	Minister of Agriculture (cabinet minister since 2007)	
MPP	Cen	Reza Moridi	Richmond Hill since 2003		
MPP	Tor	Glen Murray	Toronto Centre since 2010	Withdrawn contestant; Cabinet minister 2010–12; Mayor of Winnipeg 1998–2004	
MPP	SW	Liz Sandals	Guelph since 2003		
MPP	Tor	Mario Sergio	York West since 1995		
MPP	Tor	David Zimmer	Willowdale since 2003		
MPP		Picked up after first ballot: Margarett Best (Scarborough—Guildwood and Minister of Consumer Services); Eric Hoskins (St. Paul's); Tracy MacCharles (Pickering—Scarborough East); Picked up after second ballot: Vic Dhillon (Brampton West); Shafiq Qaadri (Etobicoke North); Charles Sousa (Mississauga South); Soo Wong (Scarborough—Agincourt)			
Former MPPs
ExMPP	Cen	Charles Beer	York North 1987–95	Minister of Community and Social Services 1989–90; 1992 leadership contestant	
ExMPP	Cen	Ken Black	Muskoka–Georgian Bay 1987–90	Minister of Tourism and Recreation 1989–90	
ExMPP	Cen	Marie Bountrogianni	Hamilton Mountain 1999–07	Cabinet minister 2003–07	
ExMPP	North	Michael A. Brown	Algoma–Manitoulin 1987–11	Speaker 2005–07	
ExMPP	Tor	Michael Bryant	St. Paul's 1999–2009	Attorney General 2003–07, cabinet minister 2003–09	
ExMPP	North	Sterling Campbell	Sudbury 1987–90		
ExMPP	Cen	Aileen Carroll	Barrie 2007–11	Minister of Culture 2007–10	
ExMP	Cen	Aileen Carroll	Barrie 1997–06	Minister of International Cooperation 2003–06	
ExMPP	Cen	Sheila Copps	Hamilton Centre 1981–84	1982 provincial leadership contestant	
ExMP	Cen	Sheila Copps	Hamilton East 1984–04	Deputy Prime Minister 1993–97, federal cabinet minister 1993–2003; 1990 & 2003 federal leadership contestant	
ExMPP	Tor	Mary Anne Chambers	Scarborough East 2003–07	Cabinet minister 2003–07	
ExMPP	Tor	Christine Hart	York East 1986–90	Minister of Culture and Communications 1989–90	
ExMPP	Cen	Don Knight	Halton 1985–87		
ExMPP	North	Lyn McLeod	Thunder Bay—Atikokan 1987–03	Cabinet minister 1987–90; party leader 1992–96	
ExMPP	Cen	Jennifer Mossop	Stoney Creek 2003–07		
ExMPP	SW	Dave Neumann	Brantford 1987–90		
ExCity	SW	Dave Neumann	Mayor of Brantford 1980–87		
ExMPP	Tor	Brad Nixon	York Mills 1987–90		
ExMPP	Cen	Julian Reed	Halton-Burlington 1975–85		
ExMP	Cen	Julian Reed	Halton 1993–2004		
ExMPP	Tor	Tim Reid	Scarborough East 1967–71		
ExMPP	North	Monique Smith	Nipissing 2003–11	Cabinet minister 2007–11	
ExMPP	Cen	Stuart Lyon Smith	Hamilton West 1975–82	Party leader 1976–82	
ExMPP		Dan Waters	NDP MPP for Muskoka-Georgian Bay 1990–95		
ExMPP	SW	John Wilkinson	Perth—Wellington 2003–11	Cabinet minister 2007–11	
ExMPP	Cen	Mavis Wilson	Dufferin—Peel 1987–90	Cabinet minister 1987–90	
Federal politicians
ExMP	Tor	Barry Campbell	St. Paul's 1993–97		
ExMP	Tor	David Collenette	Don Valley East 1993–2004	Federal cabinet minister 1983–84, 1993–2003	
ExMP	Tor	John Godfrey	Don Valley West 1993–2008	Federal cabinet minister 2004–06	
ExMP	Tor	Bill Graham	Toronto Centre 1993–07	Interim federal party leader 2006, foreign minister 2002–04, defence minister 2004–06	
MP	East	Mac Harb	Ottawa Centre 1988–2003; Senator since 2003		
MP	East	Ted Hsu	Kingston and the Islands since 2011		
ExMP	Tor	Lorna Marsden	Senator for Toronto-Taddle Creek 1984–92		
ExMP	Tor	Dennis Mills	Toronto—Danforth 1988–04		
MP	East	Jim Munson	Senator for Ottawa–Rideau Canal since 2003		
ExMP	Tor	Rob Oliphant	Don Valley West 2008–11		
MP	Tor	Nancy Ruth	Conservative Senator for Cluny since 2005	Granddaughter of former OLP leader turned Unionist federal minister Newton Rowell	
ExMP	Cen	Paddy Torsney	Burlington 1993–06		
ExMP	Cen	Bryon Wilfert	Richmond Hill 1997–11		
Municipal politicians
City	Cen	Sharon Barkley	Milton councillor		
City	Tor	Shelley Carroll	Toronto Councillor, Ward 33 Don Valley East since 2003	Toronto Budget Chief 2006–10	
City	Tor	John Sewell	Toronto Mayor 1978–80		
Other prominent individuals:
MPP		Anne Golden		President of United Way of Greater Toronto 1987–2001; president of Conference Board of Canada 2001–12	
References for endorsements of Kathleen Wynne

== Withdrawn candidates ==
=== Glen Murray ===
Type	Reg	Endorser	Constituency represented	Other roles held, notes	Ref
MPP	Cen	Kevin Flynn	Oakville since 2003		
ExMPP	Tor	Elinor Caplan	Oriole 1985–97	Cabinet minister 1985–86, 87–1990	
ExMP	Cen	Elinor Caplan	Thronhill 1997–2004	Federal cabinet minister 1999–2003; Note: Subsequently endorsed Pupatello	
References for endorsements of Glen Murray
