= Mississauga Centre (provincial electoral district) =

Provincial electoral district in Ontario, Canada

Coordinates: 43.586°N 79.661°W

Ontario electoral district
- Location in Mississauga

Provincial electoral district
- Legislature: Legislative Assembly of Ontario
MPP
Natalia Kusendova
Progressive Conservative
- District created: 1996
- First contested: 1999
- Last contested: 2025

Demographics
- Population (2016): 124,845
- Electors (2018): 88,762
- Area (km²): 23
- Pop. density (per km²): 5,428
- Census division: Peel
- Census subdivision: Mississauga

Mississauga Centre is a provincial electoral district in Ontario, Canada, that was represented in the Legislative Assembly of Ontario from 1999 to 2007, and again from 2018 to present.

This riding was originally created in 1996 from parts of Mississauga East and Mississauga West ridings. Throughout its brief existence, it was represented by Rob Sampson and Harinder Takhar. It consisted of the central part of the city of Mississauga. The electoral district was abolished in 2003 when it was redistributed between Mississauga East—Cooksville, Mississauga South, Mississauga—Brampton South, and Mississauga—Erindale ridings.

For the 2018 election, it was re-created from Mississauga East—Cooksville, Mississauga—Erindale, Mississauga—Brampton South, and Mississauga—Streetsville.

== Members of Provincial Parliament ==
Mississauga Centre
Assembly	Years	Member	Party
37th	1999–2003	Rob Sampson	Progressive Conservative
38th	2003–2007	Harinder Takhar	Liberal
Riding dissolved into Mississauga East—Cooksville, Mississauga South, Mississauga—Brampton South, and Mississauga—Erindale
Riding re-created from Mississauga East—Cooksville, Mississauga—Erindale, Mississauga—Brampton South, and Mississauga—Streetsville
42nd	2018–2022	Natalia Kusendova	Progressive Conservative
43rd	2022–present	Natalia Kusendova	Progressive Conservative

== Demographics ==
According to the 2011 Canadian census; 2013 representation

Ethnic groups: 32.8% White, 26.4% South Asian, 11.6 Chinese, 6.6% Filipino, 6.4% Arab, 5.0% Black, 2.6% Southeast Asian, 2.4% Latin American, 1.3% Korean, 1.3% West Asian
Languages: 42.9% English, 9.8% Chinese, 6.0% Urdu, 5.7% Arabic, 3.4% Tagalog, 3.1% Polish, 2.9% Portuguese, 2.8% Punjabi, 2.6% Spanish, 1.8% Hindi, 1.7% Tamil, 1.7% Vietnamese, 1.5% Italian, 1.4% French, 1.2% Gujarati, 1.0% Persian, 1.0% Korean
Religions: 52.9% Christian (33.8% Catholic, 4.0% Christian Orthodox, 2.2% Anglican, 1.5% United Church, 1.3% Pentecostal, 1.3% Baptist, 1.2% Presbyterian, 7.6% other), 16.5% Muslim, 8.9% Hindu, 2.9% Buddhist, 2.8% Sikh, 15.2% no religion
Median income (2010): $27,738
Average income (2010): $36,502

== Election results ==
=== 2018–present ===
Winning party in each polling division of Mississauga Centre at the 2025 Ontario general election

2025 Ontario general election
Party	Candidate	Votes	%	±%
Progressive Conservative	Natalia Kusendova-Bashta	16,592	46.79	+3.19
Liberal	Sumira Malik	14,561	41.06	+4.74
New Democratic	Waseem Ahmed	2,310	6.51	–5.77
Green	Robert Chan	1,028	2.90	–0.62
New Blue	Audrey Simpson	443	1.25	–0.30
None of the Above	Greg Vezina	334	0.94	+0.09
Independent	Zulfiqar Ali	195	0.55	–
Total valid votes		35,463	99.14	
Total rejected, unmarked and declined ballots		309	0.86	+0.07
Turnout		35,772	38.15	+0.01
Eligible voters		93,765		
Progressive Conservative hold		Swing		–0.78
Source: Elections Ontario

Winning party in each polling division of Mississauga Centre at the 2022 Ontario general election

2022 Ontario general election
Party	Candidate	Votes	%	±%
Progressive Conservative	Natalia Kusendova-Bashta	14,719	43.60	+2.74
Liberal	Sumira Malik	12,260	36.32	+10.92
New Democratic	Sarah Walji	4,148	12.29	–15.27
Green	Adriane Franklin	1,188	3.52	+0.89
New Blue	Audrey Simpson	523	1.55	–
Ontario Party	Stephanie Wright	332	0.98	–
None of the Above	Greg Vezina	288	0.85	–
Populist	Elie Diab	163	0.48	–
Moderate	Viktor Chornopyskyy	137	0.41	–0.03
Total valid votes		33,758	99.20	
Total rejected, unmarked and declined ballots		271	0.80	–0.30
Turnout		34,029	38.14	–11.65
Eligible voters		89,218		
Progressive Conservative hold		Swing		–4.09
Source: Elections Ontario

2018 Ontario general election
Party	Candidate	Votes	%	±%
Progressive Conservative	Natalia Kusendova-Bashta	17,860	40.86	+14.81
New Democratic	Laura Kaminker	12,046	27.56	+11.62
Liberal	Bobbie Daid	11,102	25.40	–26.09
Green	Noah Gould	1,149	2.63	–0.32
Stop the New Sex-Ed Agenda	Alex Pacis	890	2.04	–
Libertarian	Farouk Giga	471	1.08	–
Moderate	Viktor Chornopyskyy	192	0.44	–
Total valid votes		43,710	98.90	
Total rejected, unmarked and declined ballots		486	1.10	
Turnout		44,196	49.79	
Eligible voters		88,762		
Progressive Conservative notional gain from Liberal		Swing		+20.45
Source: Elections Ontario

2014 general election redistributed results
Party	Vote	%
Liberal	17,903	51.49
Progressive Conservative	9,059	26.05
New Democratic	5,543	15.94
Others	1,238	3.56
Green	1,027	2.95

=== 1999–2007 ===
2003 Ontario general election
Party	Candidate	Votes	%	±%
Liberal	Harinder Takhar	18,466	47.45	+7.20
Progressive Conservative	Rob Sampson	15,846	40.72	–10.91
New Democratic	Michael Miller	3,237	8.32	+3.29
Green	Jeffrey Scott Smith	776	1.99	–
Family Coalition	John R. Lyall	588	1.51	–
Total valid votes		38,913	99.20	
Total rejected, unmarked and declined ballots		315	0.80	–0.44
Turnout		39,228	50.89	–0.57
Eligible voters		77,091		
Liberal gain from Progressive Conservative		Swing		+9.05
Source: Elections Ontario

1999 Ontario general election
Party	Candidate	Votes	%
Progressive Conservative	Rob Sampson	18,688	51.63
Liberal	George Winter	14,572	40.26
New Democratic	Gail McCabe	1,820	5.03
Natural Law	Bob Harrington	1,117	3.09
Total valid votes		36,197	98.75
Total rejected, unmarked and declined ballots		457	1.25
Turnout		36,654	51.46
Eligible voters		71,233	
Progressive Conservative pickup new district.			
Source: Elections Ontario

== See also ==
- List of Ontario provincial electoral districts
- Canadian provincial electoral districts
- Mississauga Centre (federal electoral district)
