= 2013 Ontario Liberal Party leadership election =

Canadian provincial party election

- January 26, 2013
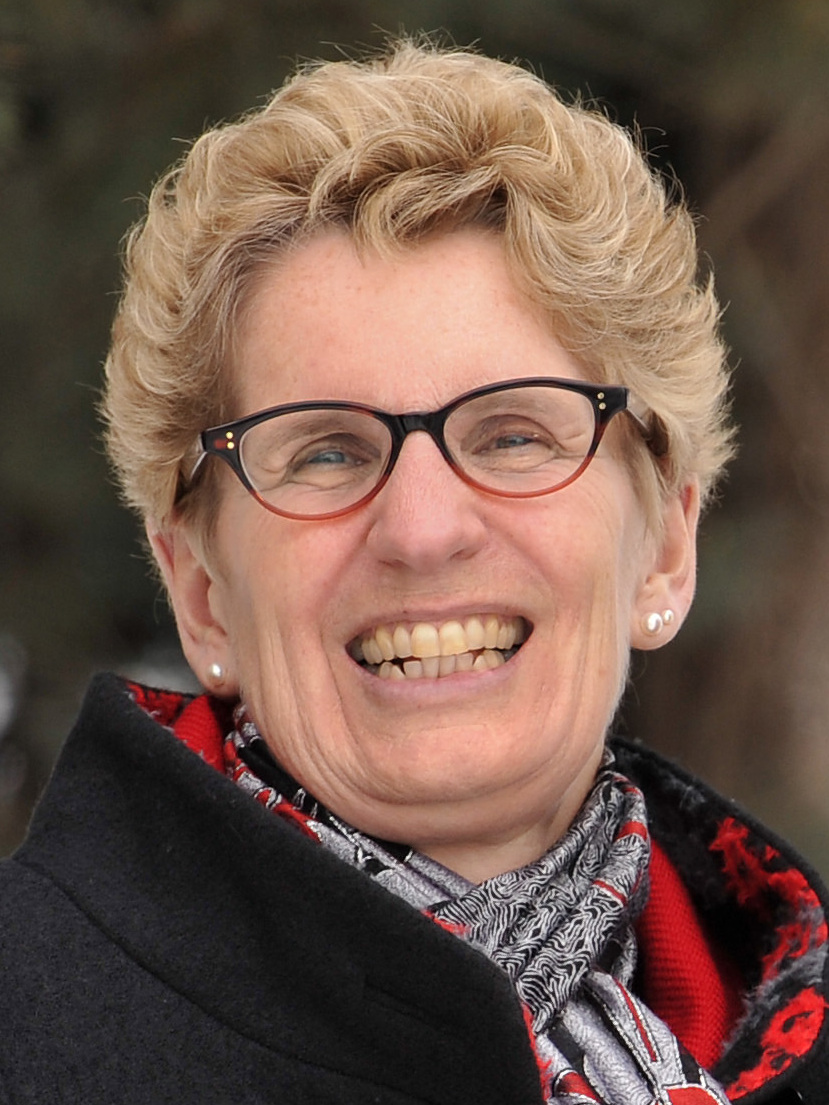

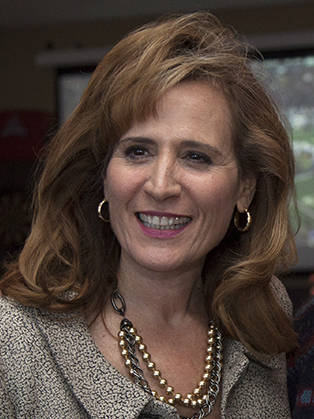

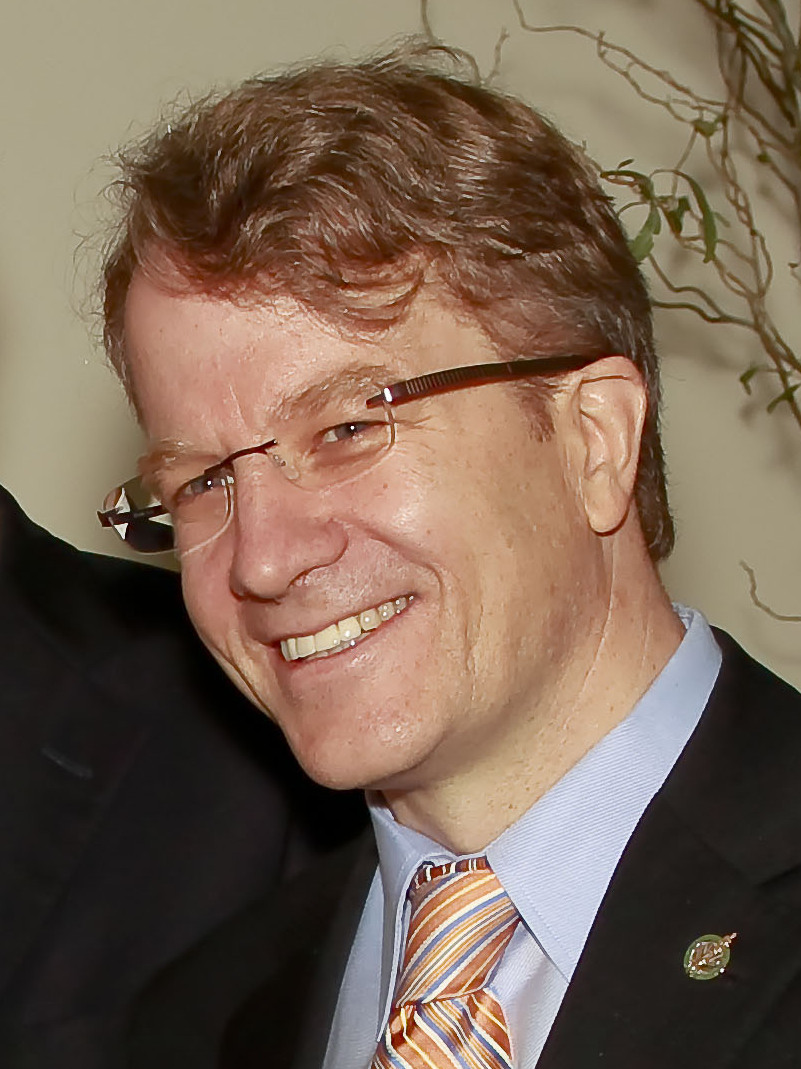

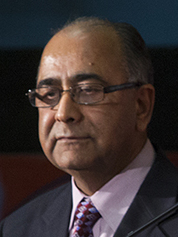

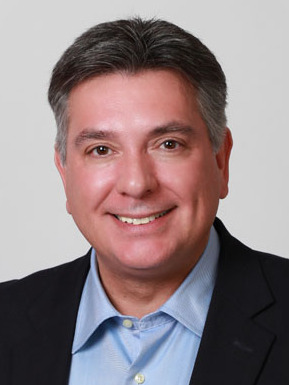

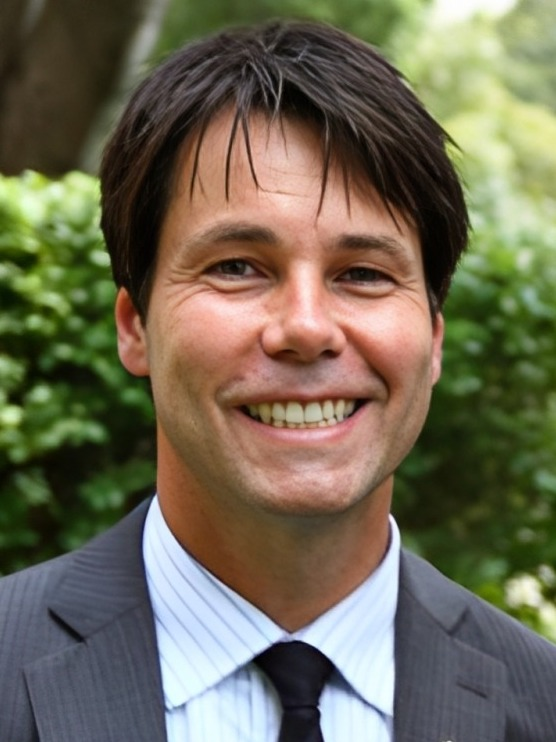
Candidate	Kathleen Wynne	Sandra Pupatello	Gerard Kennedy
Final ballot	1,150 (57.04%)	866 (42.96%)	Withdrew
First ballot	597 (28.65%)	599 (28.74%)	281 (13.48%)
Candidate	Harinder Takhar	Charles Sousa	Eric Hoskins
Final ballot	Eliminated	Withdrew	Eliminated
First ballot	235 (11.28%)	222 (10.65%)	150 (7.20%)
Leader before election
Dalton McGuinty
Elected Leader
Kathleen Wynne

2013 Ontario Liberal Party leadership election
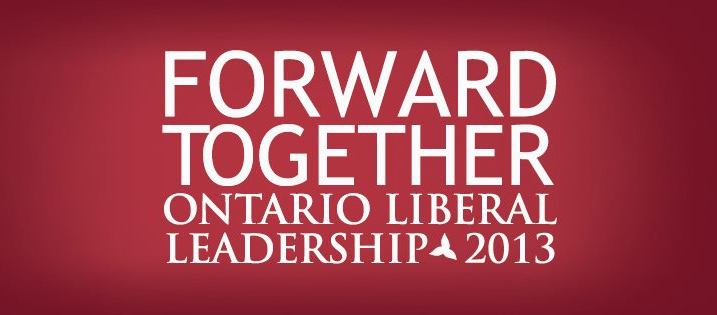
- Date: January 26, 2013
- Convention: Maple Leaf Gardens, Toronto (Mattamy Athletic Centre, Ryerson University)
- Resigning leader: Dalton McGuinty
- Won by: Kathleen Wynne
- Ballots: 3
- Candidates: 7
- Entrance fee: $50,000
- Spending limit: $500,000

The 2013 Ontario Liberal Party leadership election, culminated to a leadership convention held from January 24 to 26, 2013, at the Maple Leaf Gardens in Toronto, elected Kathleen Wynne to succeed Dalton McGuinty as the leader of the Ontario Liberal Party. By nature of the Liberal Party being in government in the province of Ontario at the time, Wynne became the premier-elect upon her election, and was formally swore in as Premier of Ontario two weeks later.

The 2013 leadership election marked Ontario Liberals first successful leadership transition while in power, where an incumbent Liberal leader and premier relinquished leadership to a democratically chosen successor who went on to retain power for the party in a subsequent election. With the election of Wynne, the 2013 leadership contest produced Ontario's first women premier, and Canada's first openly gay first minister. Unbeknownst at the time, the Toronto convention that concluded the 2013 leadership election process would be last delegated convention conducted by a political party while in government anywhere in Canada.

== Context ==
Incumbent party leader Dalton McGuinty was elected leader 17 years earlier, when the 1996 leadership election process culminated to a convention at the venue. McGuinty, like Wynne, did not enter that convention as the frontrunner. After defeating then frontrunner Gerard Kennedy, McGuinty led the party to an electoral defeat in 1999 before securing his first majority electoral victory in 2003 and forming the McGuinty ministry. He went on to lead the party to two more electoral victories in 2007 and 2011, the first Liberal leader to secure more than two electoral mandate since Sir Oliver Mowat. After leading his ministry for nine years, McGuinty announced his pending resignation as leader of the Liberal Party on October 15, 2012, citing a desire to bring new blood to the party leadership. McGuinty also, citing the political "logjam" in Ontario, prorogued the Legislative Assembly.

Following her victory at the 2013 leadership convention, Wynne formed her ministry on February 11, 2013. After leading a minority government for 14 months, she called an election on May 2, 2014 ahead of an expected defeat of her government's budget, and led her party to a renewed majority government in June 2014.

== Rules and procedures ==
Under the procedure outlined by the party's constitution, the leader was to be chosen in a traditional delegated leadership convention in which up to 2,283 delegates were eligible to vote, made up of 1,712 elected delegates (16 elected by proportional representation in each of the 107 provincial riding associations), 419 ex officio delegates (current and former Liberal MPPs, defeated candidates from the last election, riding association presidents, party executive officers and other party officials, and federal Liberal MPs for Ontario) 144 youth delegates from 18 campus clubs and eight delegates representing the Women's Commission. Riding delegates ran on the slate of a leadership candidate or as independents, in the case of the former they were required to vote for that candidate on the first ballot but were free to change their support subsequently. Balloting at convention continued until one candidate received a majority of ballots cast.

There was a $50,000 entry fee and $500,000 spending limit not including the 25% of all money raised by candidates which had to be turned over to the party in order to pay for the convention. Candidates were not permitted to accumulate more than $100,000 in debt. Nomination papers had to be signed by at least 250 party members. The registration fee for delegates was between $249 and $599.

44,421 party members were eligible to vote in the selection of delegates. Of these, less than 15,000 had been members when McGuinty announced his departure; 27,206 were recruited by the leadership campaigns before November 24.

== Timeline ==
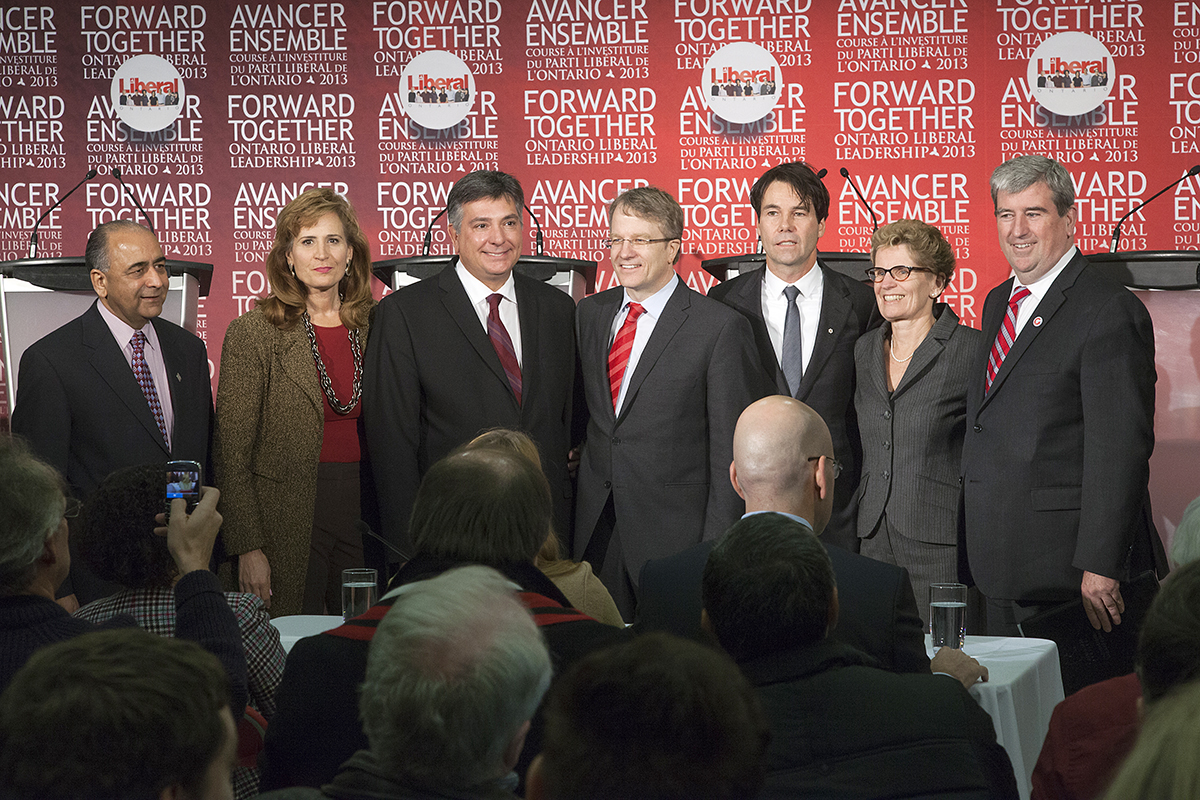
Leadership candidates debate on December 1, 2012 in Ingersoll.

- December 1, 1996 – Dalton McGuinty wins the leadership election to succeed Lyn McLeod.
- October 6, 2011 – The general election returns the Liberals to power but reduces them to 53 seats in the legislature, one short of a majority.
- September 6, 2012 – By-elections are held in the ridings of Kitchener—Waterloo and Vaughan. The Liberals had hoped to win both seats in order to secure a majority; they retain Vaughan but place third in Kitchener-Waterloo which is won by the NDP.
- September 29, 2012 – The Ontario Liberal Party's Annual General Meeting endorses Dalton McGuinty's leadership of the party with the support of 86% of delegates.
- October 2, 2012 – The opposition parties combine, in committee, to pass a rare contempt motion against Energy Minister Chris Bentley over the government's decision to cancel two gas plants prior to the 2011 election at a cost of $230 million. The opposition contends that the sale occurred in order to help the Liberals retain several seats and that Bentley has not complied with a directive by the Speaker to release all documents related to the decision.
- October 15, 2012 – Dalton McGuinty announces that he will resign as Liberal Party leader and Premier of Ontario as soon as the party holds a leadership convention. McGuinty also prorogues the legislature.
- October 21, 2012 – Liberal Party executive meets to decide on a date for the leadership election and rules government the process.
- October 28, 2012 – Liberal Party executive meets to choose a venue for the convention.
- November 23, 2012, 5 pm ET (UTC−05:00) – Deadline for candidates to pay $50,000 entry fee and file nomination papers signed by at least 250 party members. Membership cut-off date for eligibility to vote for delegates.
- December 1, 2012, 1 pm ET – Ingersoll Leadership Debate
- December 9, 2012, 1 pm ET – Thunder Bay Leadership Debate
- December 18, 2012, 7 pm ET – Ottawa Leadership Debate
- January 6, 2013, 1 pm ET – Durham Region Leadership Debate
- January 9, 2013, 7 pm ET – Toronto Leadership Debate
- January 12–13, 2013 – Delegate selection meetings will be held in all 107 Ontario ridings.
- January 25, 2013 – convention opens
- January 26, 2013 – leadership election
- January 27, 2013 – convention ends

== Candidates ==
=== Eric Hoskins ===
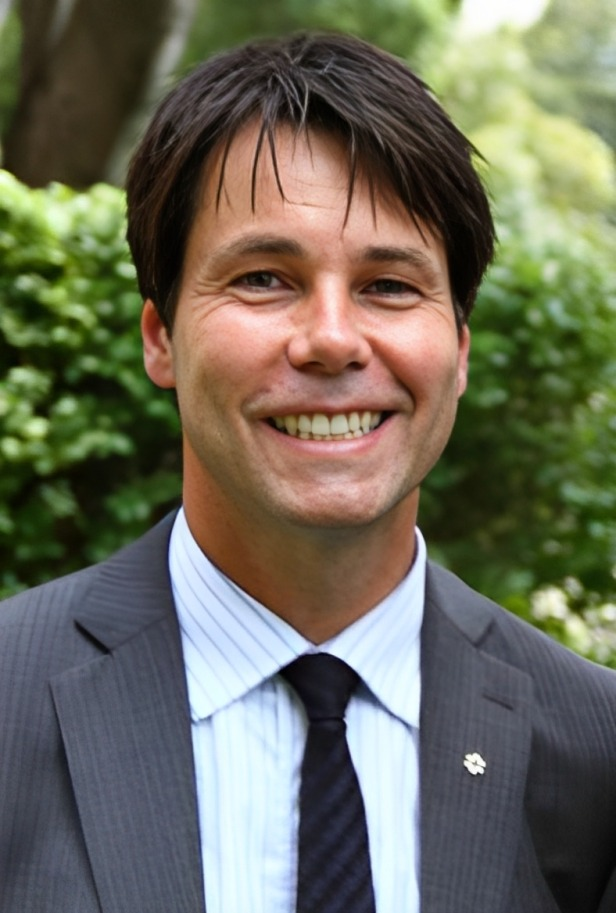
Eric Hoskins

Eric Hoskins was the MPP for St. Paul's (2009–2018); Minister of Citizenship and Immigration (2010–2011); Minister of Children and Youth Services (2011–2012); Former President of War Child Canada

Date campaign launched: November 13, 2012
Campaign website: ericforleader.ca
Members signed up: Not disclosed
Elected delegates: 104
Endorsements: Endorsements for Eric Hoskins

=== Gerard Kennedy ===
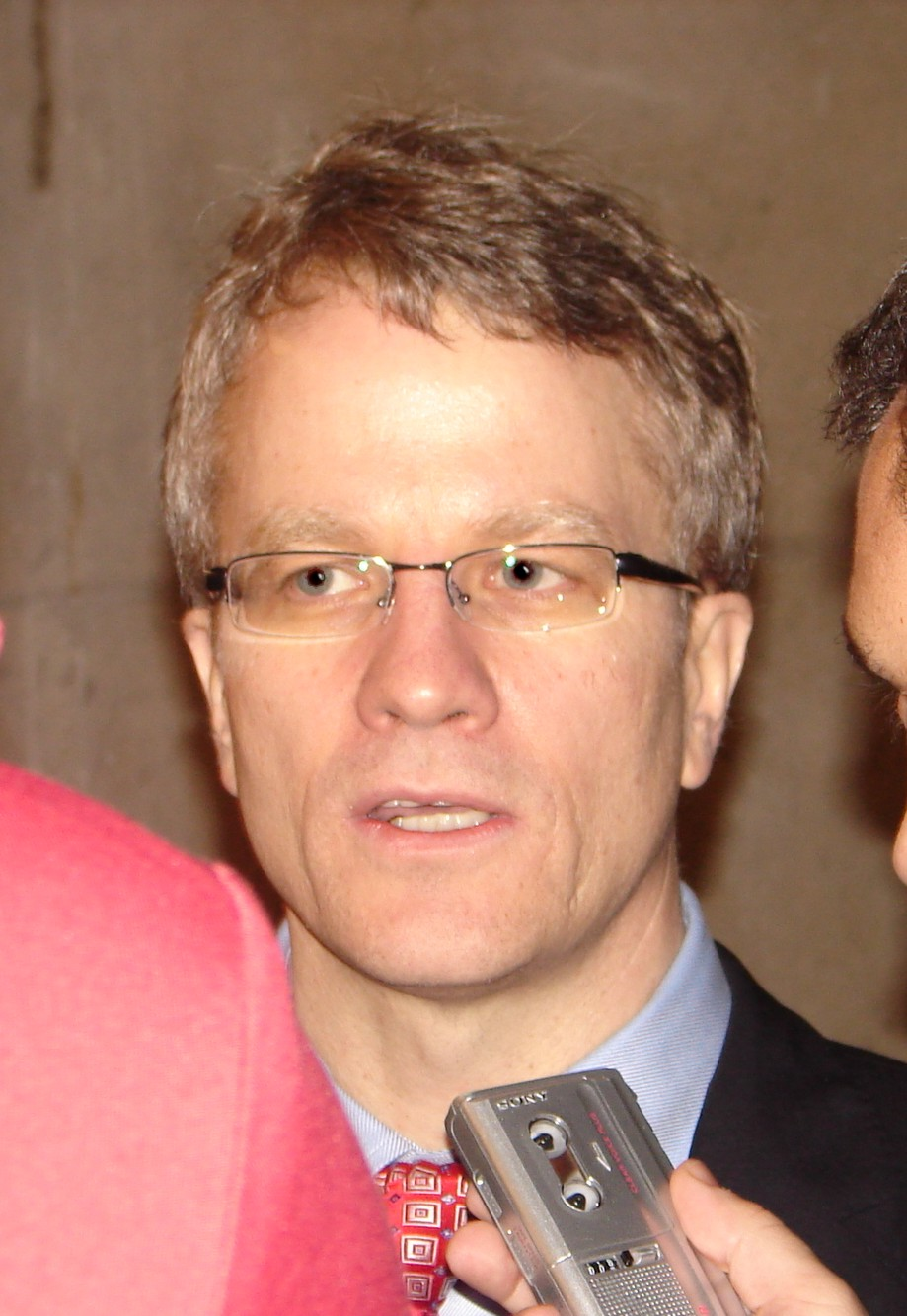
Gerard Kennedy

Gerard Kennedy is a former candidate for the Ontario Liberal leadership in 1996; MPP for Parkdale—High Park (1996–2006); Minister of Education (2003–2006); Candidate for the federal Liberal leadership in 2006; MP for Parkdale—High Park (2008–2011)

Date campaign launched: November 12, 2012
Campaign website: gerardkennedy.ca
Members signed up: 5,000 (claimed)
Elected delegates: 257
Endorsements: Endorsements for Gerard Kennedy

=== Sandra Pupatello ===
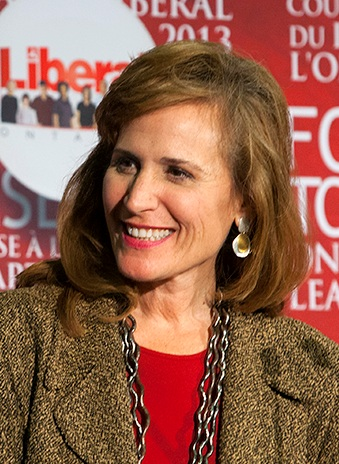
Sandra Pupatello

Sandra Pupatello is the former MPP for Windsor West (1995–2011); Minister of Community and Social Services (2003–2006); Minister of Education (2006); Minister of Economic Development and Innovation (2006–2008; 2009–2011); Minister of International Trade and Investment (2008–2009); Director of business and global markets at PricewaterhouseCoopers (2011–2012)

Date campaign launched: November 8, 2012
Campaign website: sandraforleader.ca
Members signed up: 4,000 (claimed)
Elected delegates: 504
Endorsements: Endorsements for Sandra Pupatello

=== Charles Sousa ===
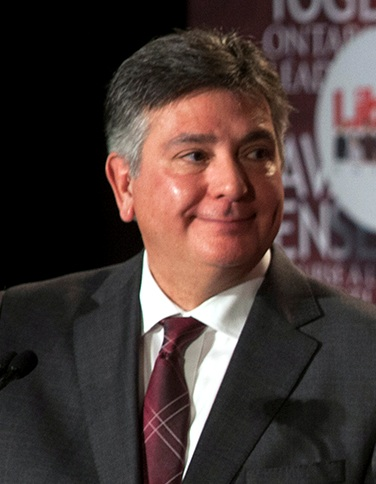
Charles Sousa

Charles Sousa is the MPP for Mississauga South (2007–2018); Minister of Labour (2010–2011); Minister of Citizenship and Immigration (2011–2012)

Date campaign launched: November 10, 2012
Campaign website: votesousa.ca
Members signed up: 6,000 (claimed)
Elected delegates: 198
Endorsements: Endorsements for Charles Sousa

=== Harinder Takhar ===
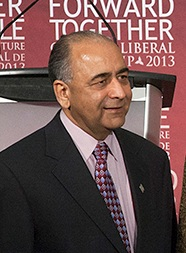
Harinder Takhar

Harinder Takhar is the MPP for Mississauga—Erindale (2003–2018); Minister of Transportation (2003–2006; Minister of Consumer Services (2006–2009); Minister of Government Services (2009–2012)

Date campaign announced: November 22, 2012
Campaign website: votetakhar.com
Members signed up: 4,000 (claimed)
Elected delegates: 244
Endorsements: Endorsements for Harinder Takhar

=== Kathleen Wynne ===
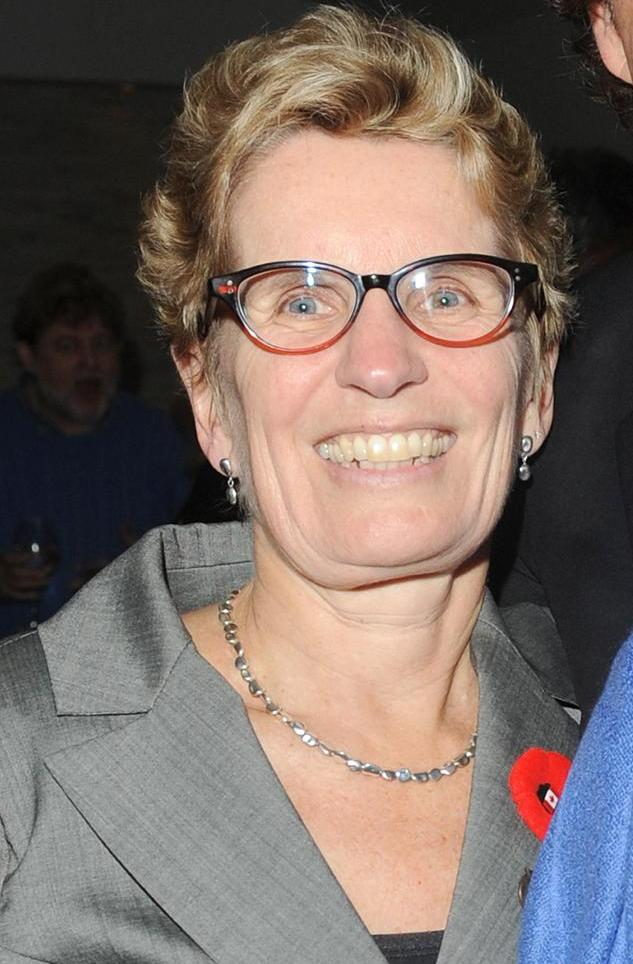
Kathleen Wynne

Kathleen Wynne is the MPP for Don Valley West (since 2003), Minister of Education (2006–10); Minister of Transportation (2010–11); Minister of Municipal Affairs and Housing and Aboriginal Affairs (2011–2012); Toronto District School Board Trustee Ward 8 (2000–03)

Date campaign launched: November 5, 2012
Campaign website: kathleenwynne.ca
Members signed up: 8,000 (claimed)
Elected delegates: 463
Endorsements: Endorsements for Kathleen Wynne

== Withdrew prior to convention ==
=== Glen Murray ===
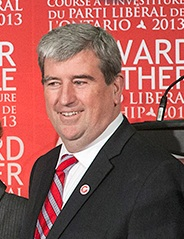
Glen Murray

Background: MPP for Toronto Centre (2010–present), Minister of Research and Innovation (2010–2011); Minister of Training, Colleges and Universities (2011–2012); CEO of the Canadian Urban Institute (2007–2010); Mayor of Winnipeg (1998–2004)
Date campaign launched: November 4, 2012
Date of withdrawal: January 10, 2013
Endorsed: Kathleen Wynne
Campaign website: www.renewliberal.ca
Members recruited: 3,000 (claimed)
Endorsements: Endorsements for Glen Murray

== Declined to run ==
- Rick Bartolucci, Minister of Northern Development and Mines, MPP for Sudbury.
- Chris Bentley, Minister of Energy and MPP for London West – retiring from politics
- Jim Bradley, Minister of Environment and MPP for St. Catharines
- Laurel Broten, Minister of Education and MPP for Etobicoke—Lakeshore
- Michael Bryant, former Attorney-General
- David Caplan, former Minister of Health and Long-Term Care (2007–2009)
- Bob Chiarelli, Minister of Transportation, Minister of Infrastructure and MPP for Ottawa West—Nepean
- Brad Duguid, Minister of Economic Development and MPP for Scarborough Centre
- Dwight Duncan, Deputy Premier, Finance Minister and MPP for Windsor—Tecumseh – retiring from politics
- John Gerretsen, Attorney-General and MPP for Kingston and the Islands
- Deb Matthews, Minister of Health and Long-term Care and MPP for London North Centre
- Yasir Naqvi, MPP for Ottawa Centre and President of the Ontario Liberal Party.
- David Orazietti, MPP for Sault Ste. Marie.
- Frank Scarpitti, Mayor of Markham, Ontario
- George Smitherman, former Deputy Premier
- John Wilkinson, former Minister of the Environment

== Opinion polling ==
=== All Ontarians ===
Poll source	Date	1st	2nd	3rd	Other
Forum Research; Sample size: 644	January 23–24, 2013	Gerard Kennedy; 33%	Sandra Pupatello; 26%	Kathleen Wynne; 25%	Eric Hoskins 11%, Charles Sousa 3%, Harinder Takhar 1%
Forum Research; Sample size: 425	December 17, 2012	Gerard Kennedy; 36%	Kathleen Wynne; 23%	Sandra Pupatello; 20%	Glen Murray 9%, Eric Hoskins 7%, Charles Sousa 3%, Harinder Takhar 1%
Forum Research; Sample size: 1,127	November 27–28, 2012	Gerard Kennedy; 16%	Sandra Pupatello; 10%	Kathleen Wynne; 8%	Eric Hoskins 3%, Glen Murray 2%, Charles Sousa 2%, Harinder Takhar 2%, None of these 30%, Don't know 27%
Innovative Research Group; Sample size: 600	October 17–22, 2012	Dwight Duncan; 5%	Kathleen Wynne; 5%	Deb Matthews; 3%	David McGuinty 3%, Jim Watson 2%, Eric Hoskins 1%, Glen Murray 1%, Yasir Naqvi 1%, Charles Sousa 1%, John Wilkinson 0%, Someone else / other 10%, Don't know 42%, None / no one / refused 26%

=== Liberal supporters only ===
Poll source	Date	1st	2nd	3rd	Other
Forum Research; Sample size: 215	January 23–24, 2013	Gerard Kennedy; 33%	Sandra Pupatello; 28%	Kathleen Wynne; 27%	Eric Hoskins 6%, Charles Sousa 4%, Harinder Takhar 3%
Forum Research; Sample size: 149	December 17, 2012	Gerard Kennedy; 29%	Sandra Pupatello; 26%	Kathleen Wynne; 22%	Glen Murray 11%, Eric Hoskins 9%, Charles Sousa 3%, Harinder Takhar 0%
Forum Research; Sample size: 313	November 27–28, 2012	Gerard Kennedy; 25%	Sandra Pupatello; 16%	Kathleen Wynne; 13%	Eric Hoskins 3%, Charles Sousa 3%, Harinder Takhar 3%, Glen Murray 2%, None of these 6%, Don't know 29%

== Results ==
=== Delegate selection meetings ===
A total of 1,857 delegates were elected from Ontario's 107 electoral districts (1,712), and from the Ontario Liberal Party's 18 youth and 8 women's clubs (141). The delegates were selected over the weekend of January 12–13, with 896 elected on January 12 from the 905 region and northern and eastern Ontario and 957 elected on January 13 from Toronto and southwestern Ontario. Most of these delegates elected were pledged to support one of the leadership candidates on the first ballot at the January 25 convention, while some were independents who could vote for whomever they chose at the convention. An additional 419 ex-officio delegates were eligible to vote at the convention by virtue of party and elected offices they have held.

=== Convention results ===
= Eliminated from next round
= Withdrew nomination
= Winner

Delegate support by ballot
Candidate	Pledged delegates		Ballot 1		Ballot 2			Ballot 3		
Name	Votes	%	Votes	%	Votes	%	+/- (pp)	Votes	%	+/- (pp)
Sandra Pupatello	509	27.4%	599	28.74%	817	39.4%	+10.7	866	43.0%	+5.8%
Kathleen Wynne	468	25.2%	597	28.65%	750	36.2%	+7.6	1,150	57.0%	+20.8
Gerard Kennedy	260	14.0%	281	13.5%	285	13.7%	+0.2	Endorsed Wynne		
Harinder Takhar	244	13.1%	235	11.3%	18	0.9%	-10.4	Endorsed Pupatello^{[A]}		
Charles Sousa	204	11.0%	222	10.7%	203	9.8%	-0.9	Endorsed Wynne		
Eric Hoskins	105	5.7%	150	7.2%	Endorsed Wynne					
Independent	67	3.6%								
Glen Murray	Endorsed Wynne									
Votes cast and net change by ballot
Total	1,857		2,084		2,073		-11	2,016		-57

^{A} Takhar endorsed Pupatello before the second ballot voting took place, but after the deadline to drop off the ballot.

== Aftermath ==
Following her victory at the 2013 leadership convention, the Wynne ministry was sworn into office on February 11, 2013 with Sousa as finance minister, Hoskins as economic development minister and Murray taking on both the transportation and infrastructure portfolios. Wynne appealed to both Pupatello and Kennedy for them to return to public life but both declined. Wynne underlined the value she places in loyalty, naming Matthews as deputy and placing all ten of her caucus supporters in her cabinet while also demonstrated her commitment to not be vindictive by retaining Takhar in cabinet and promoting a number of key Pupatello backers into cabinet. The voluntary retirement of a number of incumbent ministers created room for the inclusions of a large group new cabinet members. Only one incumbent cabinet member exited involuntarily.

Takhar's tenure in the Wynne ministry was short, having resigned after a health episode in May 2013, and was never brought back into cabinet by Wynne. Sousa in the other hand remained her trusty finance minister for the entire duration of the Wynne ministry. Hoskins got the health portfolio he long coveted, after a year of underwhelming performance at economic development, and held the post until resigning abruptly a few months before the 2018 election. Murray became environment minister in 2014 and held the role till late 2017 when he resigned to head the Pembina Institute in Alberta.

Within months of the leadership election, five former members of the McGuinty ministry, including the former Premier himself, bid their farewell from Queen's Park, opening up five by-elections for the new government to defend simultaneously. The five by-election on August 1 2013 was the most by-elections held simultaneously since 1984, after five opposition members resigned to contest the 1984 federal election. The last instance of an incumbent Ontario government defending five by-elections in government held seat was in 1930, when ministerial byelections were still legally required. The Liberals lost three of the five seats. The loss of Dwight Duncan's seat in Windsor and Chris Bentley seat in London were particularly disastrous. These by-elections further weakened the minority government.

After leading a minority government for 14 months, Wynne called an election on May 2, 2014 ahead of an expected defeat of her government's budget, and led her party to a renewed majority government in June 2014. Two of Wynne's key cabinet backer, Linda Jeffrey and John Gerretsen, retired prior to the election.

== Historical significance ==
The 2013 Ontario Liberal leadership election was of unique historical significance due to a number of factors.

=== Orderly transition of leadership ===
It was only the second instance of the Ontario Liberal Party electing a new leader while in government, and the first instance for leadership election to be held in normal course. Unlike their federal cousins or their Conservative rivals, the Ontario Liberals had virtually no experience in successful leadership transition while in power. The party's last leadership contest held while in government, in 1943, was the closing chapter of a crisis triggered by the incumbent Premier Mitch Hepburn's unsuccessful attempt at unilaterally handpicking his successor. The disastrous leadership transition kicked started four-decade in the wilderness for the party.

In deciding to relinquish his leadership on his own terms, McGuinty executed the first successful transition of leadership while the party was in power in well over a century, and the first of such transition to be conducted democratically in the party history. The last time a sitting Liberal Premier handed over party leadership to a successor who went on to secure their own electoral mandate was when Arthur Sturgis Hardy retirement and his education minister Sir George Ross assuming the premiership in 1899.

=== Madam Premier ===
Since the Ontario Liberal Party was in power when it conducted this leadership contest, with the two leading candidates both being women, the emergence of a madam premier was largely a foregone conclusion by the end of the delegate election weekend. In doing so, the Ontario Liberal Party realized an aspiration that eluded it 18 years earlier, when it failed to deliver a widely expected electoral victory to put party leader Lyn MacLeod in the premier's chair. MacLeod endorsed Wynne and was present at the 2013 leadership convention.

With the election of Kathleen Wynne, Ontario became the fifth Canadian province to have been led by a women first minister, 22 years after British Columbia produced its first women premier. Upon her election, she joined five fellow madam premiers at the Council of the Federation. That made it the first time for Canada to have six women first ministers in office concurrently. It was also the first time the government of the four most populous provinces, together account for over 85% of Canada's population, to all be led by women. The concurrent women leadership of the four provinces would last for just over a year.

=== Out and proud ===
While a woman emerging victorious was expected, the election of Kathleen Wynne, an out lesbian, was far from presumed. She entered the convention as the underdog to Pupatello Her convention speech, considered by veteran TVO journalist Steve Paiken as the most impactful convention speech by a leadership candidate, addressed her sexuality head-on:

"When I ran in 2003, I was told that the people of North Toronto and Thorncliffe Park were not ready to elect a gay woman. Well, apparently they were... I don't believe the people of Ontario judge their leaders on the basis of race, colour or sexual orientation. I don't believe they hold that prejudice in their hearts. They judge us on our merits, on our abilities, on our expertise, on our ideas – because that is how everyone deserves to be judged, that is how we want our children, our grandchildren, our nieces and nephews to be judged."

The election of Kathleen Wynne gave Canada its first openly gay first minister. When she formally took office three weeks later, Ontario with its population of over 13 million displaced Belgium as the most populous jurisdiction anywhere in the world to have an openly LGBTQ head of government (Note: Belgium, with a population of 11 million, previously held the distinction since 2011, when Elio Di Rupo was appointed its Prime Minister.) and held the distinction for 11 years until being displaced by France in 2024. (Note: When Gabriel Attal was appointed Prime Minister of France in January 2024.) With her 2014 electoral victory, Ontario displaced Sicily as the most populous jurisdiction having ever elected a LGBTQ head of government. (Note: With a population of 5 million, Sicily elected Rosario Crocetta as President of its regional government in October 2012) Ontario held the latter distinction for 12 years, until February 2026 when Netherlands's Jetton cabinet entered office. (Note: With a population of 18 million, Netherlands held general elections in October 2025 with the Democrats 66 led by Rob Jetten winning one seats more than its far right rival. Jetten formed a government four month later, a relatively short cabinet formation in Dutch standard.)

=== Last hurrah for delegated convention ===
The 2013 Ontario Liberal leadership convention was the last time the winner of a delegated leadership convention automatically became the first minister election anywhere in Canada. While other parties, including the Liberal Party of Canada, have conducted leadership elections while in power since, and some parties in the smaller provinces have held "conventions" where their members gathered to cast their ballot, no other party have conducted a delegated leadership convention while in power since.

Wynne was however not the last Premier to have secured their party leadership via a delegated convention. Two months after this convention, the Quebec Liberal Party elected Philippe Couillard as leader through a delegated convention, its first competitive leadership contest since 1978. The Quebec party was in opposition at the time, and Couillard led the party back to power the following year. The 2013 was also not the last delegated leadership convention for the Ontario Liberal Party. having elected its next leader Steven Del Duca at a delegated leadership convention held in March 2020. When the Ontario Liberals eliminated delegated convention as the final steps of its leadership election process, it was the last party with parliamentary representation to have taken the step.
