= Mississauga—Streetsville =

Mississauga—Streetsville could refer to:

- Mississauga—Streetsville (federal electoral district)
- Mississauga—Streetsville (provincial electoral district)
