= Mississauga Centre =

Mississauga Centre could refer to:

- Mississauga Centre (federal electoral district)
- Mississauga Centre (provincial electoral district)
