= Nina Tangri =

Canadian politician

The Honourable Nina Tangri ECO MPP
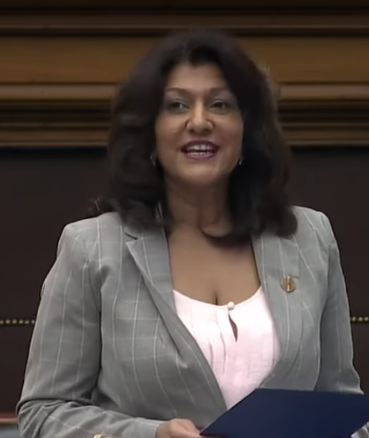
- Tangri in 2019

Associate Minister of Small Business
- Incumbent
- Assumed office September 4, 2023
- Premier: Doug Ford

Associate Minister of Small Business and Red Tape Reduction
- In office June 18, 2021 – June 24, 2022
- Premier: Doug Ford
- Preceded by: Prabmeet Sarkaria
- Succeeded by: Parm Gill (As Minister of Red Tape Reduction)

Parliamentary Assistant to the Minister of Economic Development, Job Creation and Trade (Economic Development)
- In office June 26, 2019 – June 18, 2021
- Minister: Vic Fedeli
- Preceded by: Position established
- Succeeded by: Andrew Dowie and Effie Triantafilopoulos

Member of the Ontario Provincial Parliament for Mississauga—Streetsville
- Incumbent
- Assumed office June 7, 2018
- Preceded by: Bob Delaney

Associate Minister of Housing
- In office March 24, 2023 – September 4, 2023
- Premier: Doug Ford
- Preceded by: Michael Parsa

Personal details
- Born: September 2, 1965 (age 61) South Yorkshire, England
- Party: Progressive Conservative
- Children: 3
- Occupation: Insurance Broker
- Website: ninatangri.ca

Nina Tangri ECO MPP is a Canadian politician who is Ontario's Associate Minister of Small Business. She previously served as the Associate Minister of Small Business and Red Tape Reduction from June 2021 until June 2022, and Associate Minister of Housing from March 2023 until September 2023. She was elected to the Legislative Assembly of Ontario in the 2018 provincial election. She represents the riding of Mississauga—Streetsville as a member of the Progressive Conservative Party of Ontario.

Tangri previously ran as the Progressive Conservative Party of Canada candidate for Mississauga Centre in the 2000 federal election, as the Conservative Party of Canada candidate for Mississauga—Streetsville in the 2004 federal election, as the Ontario Progressive Conservative candidate for Mississauga West in the 2003 provincial election, and for Mississauga—Streetsville in the 2007 and 2014 provincial elections.

== Candidacy for Speaker ==
On June 23, 2022, the day before the swearing-in of the new Ford Ministry, it was reported in the media that Tangri planned to run to be Speaker of the Legislature. Parm Gill assumed her cabinet position the next day.

On August 8, 2022, MPPs re-elected incumbent speaker Ted Arnott by secret ballot, despite the Premier's tacit endorsement of Tangri. This followed accusations from the Official Opposition that Government House Leader Paul Calandra "threatened to strip" the party of three presiding officers and various committee chair roles should they not support her. The Ontario NDP currently has one presiding officer position.

== Electoral record ==
2025 Ontario general election: Mississauga—Streetsville
| Party | Candidate | Votes | % | ±% |
|---|---|---|---|---|
| Progressive Conservative | Nina Tangri | 19,118 | 47.71 | +2.13 |
| Liberal | Jill Promoli | 17,297 | 43.17 | +7.69 |
| New Democratic | Shoaib Khawar | 2,012 | 5.02 | –6.97 |
| Green | Chris Hill | 1,012 | 2.53 | –0.47 |
| New Blue | Darryl Brothers | 630 | 1.57 | –0.37 |
| Total valid votes | | 40,069 | 99.25 | |
| Total rejected, unmarked and declined ballots | | 302 | 0.75 | +0.41 |
| Turnout | | 40,371 | 44.31 | +1.64 |
| Eligible voters | | 91,117 | | |
| Progressive Conservative hold | | Swing | | +4.91 |
Source: Elections Ontario

2022 Ontario general election: Mississauga—Streetsville
| Party | Candidate | Votes | % | ±% |
|---|---|---|---|---|
| Progressive Conservative | Nina Tangri | 17,317 | 45.58 | +2.05 |
| Liberal | Jill Promoli | 13,479 | 35.48 | +9.75 |
| New Democratic | Nicholas Rabba | 4,554 | 11.99 | –13.85 |
| Green | Reead Rahamut | 1,137 | 2.99 | +0.18 |
| New Blue | Amir Kendic | 737 | 1.94 | – |
| Ontario Party | Christine Oliver | 484 | 1.27 | – |
| None of the Above | Len Little | 209 | 0.55 | –0.92 |
| Populist | Fourat Jajou | 72 | 0.19 | – |
| Total valid votes | | 37,989 | 99.66 | |
| Total rejected, unmarked and declined ballots | | 130 | 0.34 | –0.63 |
| Turnout | | 38,119 | 42.67 | –12.86 |
| Eligible voters | | 89,334 | | |
| Progressive Conservative hold | | Swing | | –3.85 |
Source: Elections Ontario

2018 Ontario general election: Mississauga—Streetsville
| Party | Candidate | Votes | % | ±% |
|---|---|---|---|---|
| Progressive Conservative | Nina Tangri | 20,879 | 43.53 | +14.29 |
| New Democratic | Jacqueline Gujarati | 12,393 | 25.84 | +12.32 |
| Liberal | Bob Delaney | 12,344 | 25.74 | –25.39 |
| Green | Abhijeet Manay | 1,349 | 2.81 | –1.09 |
| None of the Above | Greg Vezina | 704 | 1.47 | – |
| Libertarian | Richard Levesque | 295 | 0.62 | – |
| Total valid votes | | 47,964 | 99.03 | |
| Total rejected, unmarked and declined ballots | | 468 | 0.97 | |
| Turnout | | 48,432 | 55.53 | |
| Eligible voters | | 87,225 | | |
| Progressive Conservative notional gain from Liberal | | Swing | | +19.84 |
Source: Elections Ontario

2014 Ontario general election
| Party | Candidate | Votes | % | ±% |
|---|---|---|---|---|
| Liberal | Bob Delaney | 22,587 | 52.57 | +1.03 |
| Progressive Conservative | Nina Tangri | 12,060 | 28.07 | -1.47 |
| New Democratic | Anju Sikka | 5,885 | 13.70 | -1.53 |
| Green | Scott Warner | 1,566 | 3.64 | -0.04 |
| None of the Above | Alexander Vezina | 524 | 1.22 | |
| Libertarian | Dave Walach | 342 | 0.80 | |
| Total valid votes | | 42,964 | 100.0 | |
| Liberal hold | | Swing | | +1.25 |
Source: Elections Ontario

2007 Ontario general election
| Party | Candidate | Votes | % |
|---|---|---|---|
| Liberal | Bob Delaney | 20,264 | 52.55 |
| Progressive Conservative | Nina Tangri | 11,155 | 28.93 |
| New Democratic | Gail McCabe | 3,944 | 10.23 |
| Green | Scott Warner | 2,925 | 7.59 |
| Family Coalition | Masood Atchekzai | 274 | 0.71 |
| Total valid votes | | | 100.0 |

2004 Canadian federal election
| Party | Candidate | Votes | % | ±% | Expenditures |
|---|---|---|---|---|---|
| Liberal | Wajid Khan | 22,768 | 50.6 | NA | $75,888 |
| Conservative | Nina Tangri | 14,287 | 31.7 | NA | $77,315 |
| New Democratic | Manjinder Rai | 4,266 | 9.5 | NA | $3,358 |
| Green | Otto Casanova | 2,415 | 5.4 | NA | $0 |
| Progressive Canadian | Peter Gibson Creighton | 1,293 | 2.9 | NA | $4,420 |
| Total valid votes/Expense limit | | 45,029 | 100.0 | $160,981 | |
| Total rejected ballots | | 260 | 0.6 | | |
| Turnout | | 45,289 | 57.9 | | |

2003 Ontario general election: Mississauga West
| Party | Candidate | Votes | % | ±% |
|---|---|---|---|---|
| Liberal | Bob Delaney | 27,903 | 50.84 | +12.81 |
| Progressive Conservative | Nina Tangri | 20,406 | 37.18 | –20.13 |
| New Democratic | Arif Raza | 4,196 | 7.64 | +3.81 |
| Green | Richard Pereira | 1,395 | 2.54 | – |
| Family Coalition | Charles Montano | 989 | 1.80 | – |
| Total valid votes | | 54,889 | 99.29 | |
| Total rejected, unmarked and declined ballots | | 390 | 0.71 | +0.52 |
| Turnout | | 55,279 | 54.67 | +0.21 |
| Eligible voters | | 101,112 | | |
| Liberal gain from Progressive Conservative | | Swing | | +16.47 |
Source: Elections Ontario
