= Chris Bentley =

Chris Bentley may refer to:

- Chris Bentley (rugby union) (born 1987), English rugby union player
- Chris Bentley (politician) (born c. 1956), Canadian politician
