= Mississauga West (provincial electoral district) =

Former provincial electoral district in Ontario, Canada

Mississauga West was a provincial electoral district in Ontario, Canada, that was represented in the Legislative Assembly of Ontario from 1987 to 2007.

From 1987 to 1999 Mississauga West consisted of the part of the city of Mississauga between the Queen Elizabeth Way on the south, Eglinton Avenue on the north and Hurontario Street, Central Parkway and Cawthra Road on the east.

From 1999 to 2007 Mississauga West consisted of the part of the City of Mississauga lying of north of Dundas Street West west of the Credit River, the 403 and the Erin Mills Parkway, south of the 401.

The electoral district was abolished in 2003 when it was re-distributed between Mississauga South, Mississauga—Erindale and Mississauga—Streetsville ridings.

== Members of Provincial Parliament ==
Mississauga West
Assembly	Years	Member	Party
Riding created
34th	1987–1990	Steve Mahoney	Liberal
35th	1990–1995	Steve Mahoney	Liberal
36th	1995–1999	Rob Sampson	Progressive Conservative
37th	1999–2003	John Snobelen	Progressive Conservative
38th	2003–2007	Bob Delaney	Liberal
Riding dissolved into Mississauga South, Mississauga—Erindale, and Mississauga—Streetsville

== Election results ==
=== 1999–2007 ===
2003 Ontario general election
Party	Candidate	Votes	%	±%
Liberal	Bob Delaney	27,903	50.84	+12.81
Progressive Conservative	Nina Tangri	20,406	37.18	–20.13
New Democratic	Arif Raza	4,196	7.64	+3.81
Green	Richard Pereira	1,395	2.54	–
Family Coalition	Charles Montano	989	1.80	–
Total valid votes		54,889	99.29	
Total rejected, unmarked and declined ballots		390	0.71	+0.52
Turnout		55,279	54.67	+0.21
Eligible voters		101,112		
Liberal gain from Progressive Conservative		Swing		+16.47
Source: Elections Ontario

1999 Ontario general election
Party	Candidate	Votes	%	±%
Progressive Conservative	John Snobelen	26,816	57.31	+11.11
Liberal	Bob Delaney	17,792	38.03	–2.38
New Democratic	Maxine Caron	1,795	3.84	–7.90
Natural Law	Fred Fredeen	387	0.83	–
Total valid votes		46,790	99.82	
Total rejected, unmarked and declined ballots		85	0.18	–0.86
Turnout		46,875	54.46	–5.88
Eligible voters		86,075		
Progressive Conservative hold		Swing		+6.74
Source: Elections Ontario

=== 1987–1999 ===
1995 Ontario general election
Party	Candidate	Votes	%	±%
Progressive Conservative	Rob Sampson	26,614	46.21	+21.10
Liberal	Steve Mahoney	23,275	40.41	–1.70
New Democratic	Paul Daniel	6,758	11.73	–17.56
Confederation of Regions	S. George Meekins	952	1.65	–
Total valid votes		57,599	98.95	
Total rejected, unmarked and declined ballots		609	1.05	–0.81
Turnout		58,208	60.33	+0.74
Eligible voters		96,475		
Progressive Conservative gain from Liberal		Swing		+19.33
Source: Elections Ontario

1990 Ontario general election
Party	Candidate	Votes	%	±%
Liberal	Steve Mahoney	20,038	42.11	–18.25
New Democratic	Tom Malone	13,938	29.29	+13.15
Progressive Conservative	Judi Bachmann	11,945	25.10	+1.61
Libertarian	Emanuel Batler	892	1.87	–
Independent	Daniel Achireko	771	1.62	–
Total valid votes		47,584	98.14	
Total rejected, unmarked and declined ballots		900	1.86	+1.40
Turnout		48,484	59.59	+3.01
Eligible voters		81,356		
Liberal hold		Swing		–15.70
Source: Elections Ontario

1987 Ontario general election
Party	Candidate	Votes	%
Liberal	Steve Mahoney	23,482	60.37
Progressive Conservative	Darwin Kealey	9,138	23.49
New Democratic	Paul Simon	6,280	16.14
Total valid votes		38,900	99.54
Total rejected ballots		179	0.46
Turnout		39,079	56.58
Eligible voters		69,068	
Liberal pickup new district.			
Source: Elections Ontario

== See also ==
- List of Ontario provincial electoral districts
- Canadian provincial electoral districts
