= Bob Delaney (politician) =

Canadian politician

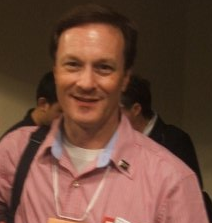

Ontario MPP
- In office 2003–2018
- Preceded by: John Snobelen
- Succeeded by: Nina Tangri
- Constituency: Mississauga—Streetsville; Mississauga West (2003-2007)

Personal details
- Born: 1953 (age 72–73) Montreal, Quebec, Canada
- Party: Liberal
- Occupation: IT consultant
- Portfolio: Chief Government Whip (2014-2015)

Bob Delaney (born c. 1953) is a former politician in Ontario, Canada. He was the Liberal member of the Legislative Assembly of Ontario from 2003 to 2018 who represented the ridings of Mississauga West and Mississauga—Streetsville.

== Background ==
Delaney was born in Montreal, Quebec, and has a Bachelor of Science degree in physics from Concordia University in that city. He received a Master of Arts degree in business administration from Simon Fraser University in British Columbia in 1988, and has received accreditation from the Canadian Public Relations Society. He has lived primarily in Mississauga since 1983.

== Politics ==
Delaney ran for the Ontario legislature in the provincial election of 1999 losing to Progressive Conservative cabinet minister John Snobelen by about 9,000 votes in the riding of Mississauga West. After Snobelen resigned from the legislature in early 2003 Delaney ran for the Liberals again in the provincial election of 2003, this time defeating Progressive Conservative candidate Nina Tangri by over 7,000 votes. He was re-elected in 2007, 2011 and 2014.

In 2006, Delaney was appointed the parliamentary assistant (PA) to the Minister Responsible for Seniors. He has subsequently served as PA to the Minister of Research and Innovation, the Minister of Tourism, the Minister of Revenue, the Minister of Education and the Minister of Energy. He also served as chair of the Standing Committee on Finance and Economic Affairs from 2011 to 2013.

On March 25, 2014, he was named Chief Government Whip.

In May 2016, Delaney issued a statement apologizing to a mother who had informed his constituency staff that she was planning to distribute pamphlets at his office protesting changes in the autism program that would affect her son and was subsequently visited by officers of the Peel Regional Police who told her that she could not touch the office door while protesting.

In March 2018, Delaney responded to a question by The Mississauga News by boasting that his Liberal government had increased the provincial debt: "We have tripled the debt and we're proud of it, because we can afford it. It's the responsible thing to do. It's the correct thing to do, it's what people have asked us to do and I would do it again and do it proudly". Delaney initially denied having made the statement in an e-mail to Global News Radio AM 640. However, he subsequently admitted to it and apologized.

== Electoral record ==
2018 Ontario general election: Mississauga—Streetsville
Party	Candidate	Votes	%	±%
Progressive Conservative	Nina Tangri	20,879	43.53	+14.29
New Democratic	Jacqueline Gujarati	12,393	25.84	+12.32
Liberal	Bob Delaney	12,344	25.74	–25.39
Green	Abhijeet Manay	1,349	2.81	–1.09
None of the Above	Greg Vezina	704	1.47	–
Libertarian	Richard Levesque	295	0.62	–
Total valid votes		47,964	99.03	
Total rejected, unmarked and declined ballots		468	0.97	
Turnout		48,432	55.53	
Eligible voters		87,225		
Progressive Conservative notional gain from Liberal		Swing		+19.84
Source: Elections Ontario

2014 Ontario general election
Party	Candidate	Votes	%	±%
Liberal	Bob Delaney	22,587	52.56	+1.02
Progressive Conservative	Nina Tangri	12,039	28.01	-1.53
New Democratic	Anju Sikka	5,886	13.70	-1.53
Green	Scott Warner	1,590	3.70	+0.02
None of the Above	Alexander Vezina	524	1.22	
Libertarian	Dave Walach	348	0.81	
Total valid votes		42.974	100.0	
Liberal hold		Swing		+1.28

2011 Ontario general election
Party	Candidate	Votes	%	±%
Liberal	Bob Delaney	18,591	51.5	-1.0
Progressive Conservative	Wafik Sunbaty	10,665	29.5	+1.5
New Democratic	Raed Ayad	5,494	15.2	+4.8
Green	Scott Warner	1,329	3.7	-3.9
Total valid votes		36,079	100.0	

2007 Ontario general election
Party	Candidate	Votes	%	±%
Liberal	Bob Delaney	20,316	52.5	
Progressive Conservative	Nina Tangri	11,163	28.0	
New Democratic	Gail McCabe	4,014	10.4	
Green	Scott Warner	2,946	7.6	
Family Coalition	Masood Atchekzai	6098	0.7	
Total valid votes		44,537	100.0	

2003 Ontario general election
Party	Candidate	Votes	%	±%
Liberal	Bob Delaney	27,903	50.84	+12.81
Progressive Conservative	Nina Tangri	20,406	37.18	-20.13
New Democratic	Arif Raza	4,196	7.64	+3.80
Green	Richard Pereira	1,395	2.54	
Family Coalition	Charles Montano	989	1.8	

1999 Ontario general election
Party	Candidate	Votes	%	±%
Progressive Conservative	John Snobelen	26,816	57.31	
Liberal	Bob Delaney	17,792	38.03	
New Democratic	Maxine Caron	1,795	3.84	
Natural Law	Fred Fredeen	387	0.83	
