= Rob Sampson =

Canadian politician (born 1955)

The Honourable Rob Sampson ECO

Ontario MPP
- In office 1999–2003
- Preceded by: Riding established
- Succeeded by: Harinder Takhar
- Constituency: Mississauga Centre
- In office 1995–1999
- Preceded by: Steve Mahoney
- Succeeded by: Riding dissolved
- Constituency: Mississauga West

Personal details
- Born: October 27, 1955 (age 70) Kingston, Ontario
- Party: Progressive Conservative
- Occupation: Businessman

Rob Sampson (born October 27, 1955) is a former politician in Ontario, Canada. He was a Progressive Conservative member of the Legislative Assembly of Ontario from 1995 to 2003 and was a cabinet minister in the government of Mike Harris.

== Background ==
Sampson has a Bachelor of Arts degree and an MBA from Queen's University. Sampson worked at the Toronto branch of the Toronto Dominion Bank from 1980 to 1987, and at the Toronto branch of Chase Manhattan from 1987 to 1995. He also worked for Brays Lane Consulting in 1995, and is a Fellow in the Institute of Canadian Bankers. In 1992-93, he was an Executive Member of the Planning Advisory Committee for the City of Toronto.

== Politics ==
He was elected to the Ontario legislature in the provincial election of 1995, defeating Liberal Steve Mahoney (later a federal cabinet minister under Jean Chrétien) by about 3,000 votes in the riding of Mississauga West. This was considered an upset; the Tories performed extremely well in Mississauga in this election, but most observers expected that Mahoney would retain his seat. He was named a Minister without Portfolio in Mike Harris's government on 16 August 1996, with responsibility for privatization.

During his time as Minister of Privatization, he was best known for sale of the 407-ETR Major Highway for $3.1 billion. The highway was sold to a consortium including the Spanish company Grupo Ferrovial and its subsidiary Cintra Concesiones de Infraestructuras de Transporte, SNC-Lavalin, and Capital d'Amerique CDPQ, a subsidiary of the Caisse de depot et placement du Quebec. The sale was heavily criticized as being well below value. It was estimated that the cost of acquiring the land exceeded $100 billion since the 1970s.

Sampson was re-elected in the new riding of Mississauga Centre in the provincial election of 1999, defeating Liberal George Winter by over 4,000 votes. He was promoted to Minister of Correctional Services on 17 June 1999. He stepped down from this position on 4 December 2000 to demonstrate ministerial responsibility after a backbench Tory named Doug Galt listed the names of several young offenders in the legislature; he was returned to his position on March 8, 2001.

Sampson is a committed Neo-conservative, and supported numerous right-wing economic policy initiatives during his time in government, including the controversial privatization of Highway 407. As Correctional Services minister, he promoted the privatization of Ontario's prison system despite warnings that this could result in decreased safety. Sampson was dropped from cabinet when Ernie Eves succeeded Mike Harris as party leader in 2002.

In the provincial election of 2003, he was defeated by Liberal Harinder Takhar by fewer than 3,000 votes, amid a general decline in support for the Tories in Mississauga.

=== Cabinet positions ===
Harris ministry, Province of Ontario (1995–2002)
Cabinet posts (2)
Predecessor	Office	Successor
Bob Runciman	Minister of Correctional Services; 1999–2000, 2001–2002	Bob Runciman
Sub-Cabinet Post
Predecessor	Title	Successor
	Minister without portfolio (1996–1999); Responsible for Privatization	
