= Harinder Takhar =

Canadian politician

The Honourable Harinder Takhar ECO
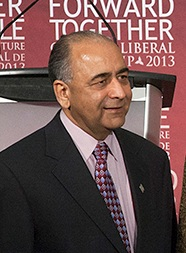

Ontario MPP
- In office 2003–2018
- Preceded by: Rob Sampson
- Succeeded by: Riding abolished
- Constituency: Mississauga—Erindale; Mississauga Centre (2003-2007)

Personal details
- Born: Harinder Jeet Singh Takhar; 1951 (age 74–75) Punjab, India
- Party: Liberal
- Spouse: Balwinder
- Children: 2
- Education: MA Guru Nanak Dev University; BA Punjabi University
- Occupation: Businessman

Harinder Jeet Singh Takhar (born c. 1951) is a former politician in Ontario, Canada. He was a Liberal member of the Legislative Assembly of Ontario from 2003 to 2018 who represented the ridings of Mississauga Centre and Mississauga—Erindale. He served in the cabinets of Dalton McGuinty and Kathleen Wynne.

== Background ==
Takhar was born to a Sikh family in the Indian state of Punjab, with a background in farming and civil service work. He moved to Canada in 1974, and arrived in Mississauga, Ontario in 1977. He obtained a bachelor's degree in English and a master's degree in economics and political science and recently added Kellogg Schlich's EMBA degree to his FCPA and FCMA designations.

He has been certified as a CMA. He has taught CMA and CGA-accredited courses at Sheridan College for thirteen years. Takhar held senior financial positions with AGRA Industries Limited, Linear Technology Inc./Gennum Corporation, and Timex Canada Inc. He also served as an Associate Director and Chief Financial Officer of Peel District School Board from 1994 to 2003. In addition, he also served as the president and chief executive officer of the Chalmers Group of Companies.

Takhar received the 2001 Community Service Award from the Society of Management Accountants of Ontario for "demonstrating selflessness and kindness for the benefit of society." He lives with his wife Balwinder and their two daughters in Mississauga.

== Politics ==
Takhar ran in the 2003 provincial election as the Liberal candidate in the riding of Mississauga Centre. He defeated Progressive Conservative incumbent Rob Sampson by 2,620 votes. He ran again in 2007 in the redistributed riding of Mississauga—Erindale defeating PC candidate David Brown by 6,638 votes. He was re-elected in 2011. While it was initially reported that he intended to retire, he changed his mind about running and was re-elected in June 2014.

He was appointed Minister of Transportation on October 23, 2003, by Premier Dalton McGuinty. He is the first Indian-Canadian to hold a cabinet post in Ontario. In October 2007 he was appointed as a Minister of Small Business and Entrepreneurship.

In September 2008, Takhar was reappointed to a slightly revised cabinet post of Minister of Small Business and Consumer Services. In June 2009, Takhar's moved to the positions of Minister of Government Services.

He resigned from Cabinet in 2012 to stand as a candidate in the 2013 Liberal leadership convention to choose McGuinty's successor. Takhar ran a very focused campaign, put forward very innovative policies, and surprised everyone with the number of delegates he could secure to support his leadership bid. After the first round, he withdrew to endorse Sandra Pupatello, who went on to lose to Kathleen Wynne.

On February 11, 2013, Wynne reappointed Takhar to Minister of Government Services. Also, it made him the Management Board Chair. On May 8, 2013, he resigned from Cabinet after being hospitalized after he lost his mother .

He remained in the legislature as MPP until he decided not to seek reelection in June 2018. He currently serves as the Chairman/CEO of Chalmers Group of Companies based in Mississauga. He previously served as the Chairman of United Way of Peel and Chair of the Board of Credit Valley Hospital. He was also the founding member and president of the International Punjabi Chamber of Commerce. Takhar frequently appears on radio programs to express his views regarding political and economic issues and is a highly respected member of the South Asian community.

=== Cabinet positions ===
Wynne ministry, Province of Ontario (2013–2018)
Cabinet post (1)
Predecessor	Office	Successor
Dwight Duncan	Chair of the Management Board of Cabinet; 2013 (February–May)	Charles Sousa
McGuinty ministry, Province of Ontario (2003–2013)
Cabinet posts (3)
Predecessor	Office	Successor
Ted McMeekin	Minister of Government Services; 2009–2013	Dwight Duncan
New ministry	Minister of Small Business and Consumer Services; 2006–2009	Ted McMeekin (Note: Minister of Consumer Services); Sandra Pupatello (Note: Minister of Small Business)
Frank Klees	Minister of Transportation; 2003–2006	Donna Cansfield

== Electoral record ==
2014 Ontario general election
Party	Candidate	Votes	%	±%
Liberal	Harinder Takhar	25,174	48.83	+3.80
Progressive Conservative	Jeff White	15,375	29.82	-5.88
New Democratic	Michelle Bilek	7,745	15.02	-2.00
Green	Vivek Gupta	1,196	2.32	+0.45
Libertarian	Christopher Jewell	892	1.73	
None of the Above	Greg Vezina	706	1.37	
Family Coalition	Nabila Kiyani	469	0.91	
Total valid votes		51,557	100.00	
Liberal hold		Swing		+4.84
Source: Elections Ontario

2011 Ontario general election
Party	Candidate	Votes	%	±%
Liberal	Harinder Takhar	20,552	45.0	-2.6
Progressive Conservative	David Brown	16,294	35.7	+2.5
New Democratic	Michelle Bilek	7,768	17.0	-5.6
Green	Otto Casanova	853	1.9	-5.9
Freedom	Gerald Jackson	176	0.4	
Total valid votes		45,643	100.0	

2007 Ontario general election
Party	Candidate	Votes	%	±%
Liberal	Harinder Takhar	21,294	47.6%	N/A
Progressive Conservative	David Brown	14,838	33.2%	N/A
New Democratic	Shaila Kibria	5,117	11.4%	N/A
Green	Richard Pietro	3,495	7.8%	N/A

2003 Ontario general election
Party	Candidate	Votes	%	±%
Liberal	Harinder Takhar	18,466	47.45	+7.19
Progressive Conservative	Rob Sampson	15,846	40.72	-10.91
New Democratic	Michael Miller	3,237	8.32	+3.29
Green	Jeffrey Scott Smith	776	1.99	
Family Coalition	John R. Lyall	588	1.51	
