= Mississauga—Erindale (provincial electoral district) =

Coordinates: 43.4°N 79.8°W

Ontario electoral district
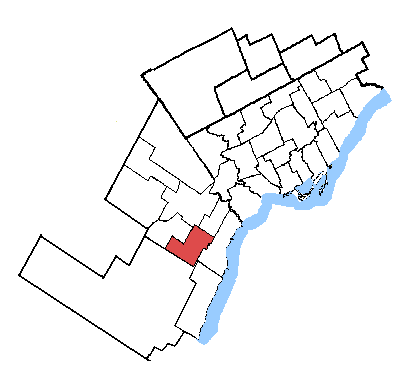
- Mississauga—Erindale in relation to other Greater Toronto ridings

Defunct provincial electoral district
- Legislature: Legislative Assembly of Ontario
- District created: 2003
- District abolished: 2018
- First contested: 2007
- Last contested: 2014

Demographics
- Population (2011): 160,663
- Electors (2011): 99,774
- Area (km²): 49
- Census division: Peel
- Census subdivision: Mississauga

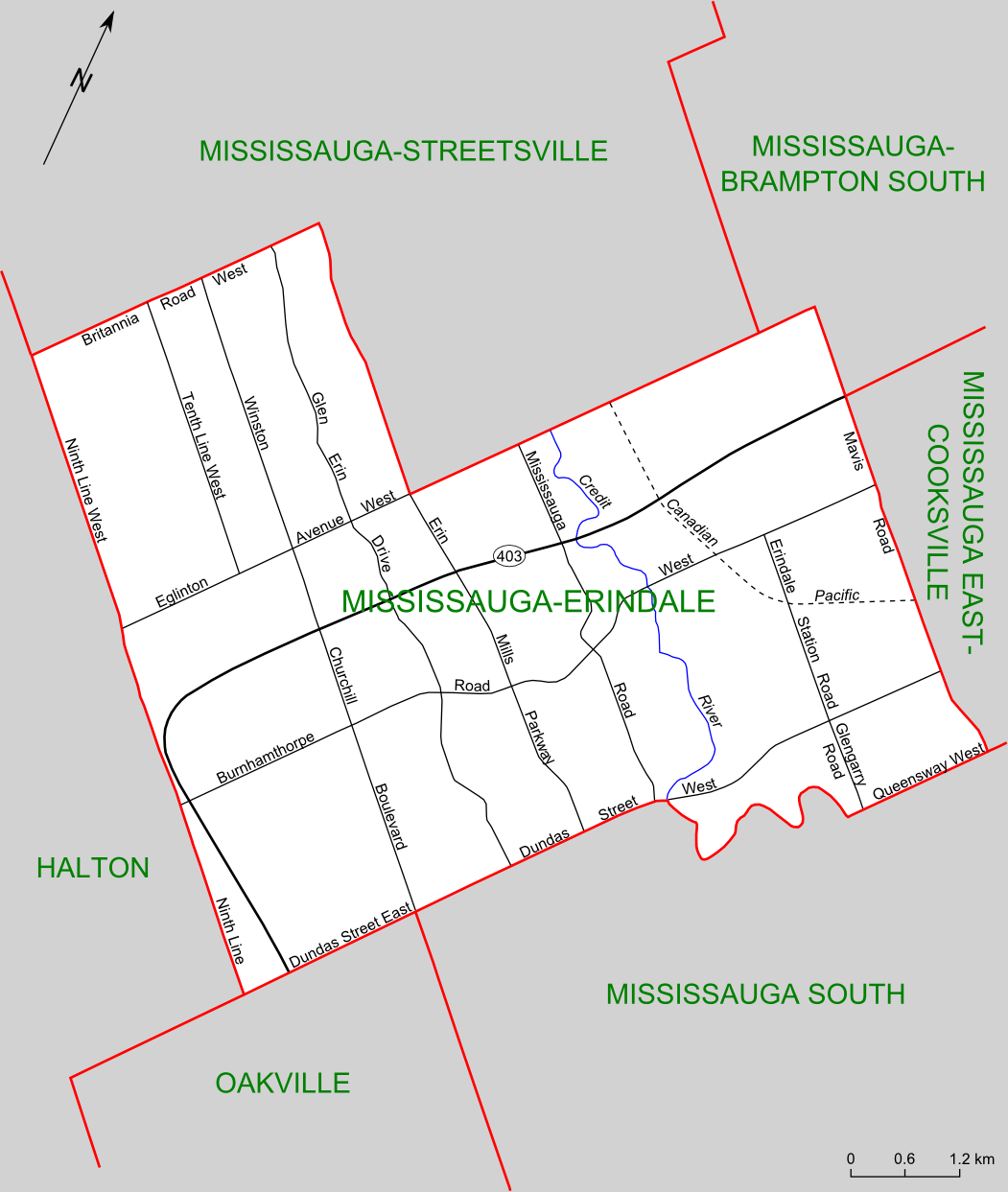
Map of Mississauga-Erindale

Mississauga—Erindale was a provincial electoral district in Ontario, Canada, that has been represented in the Legislative Assembly of Ontario since 2007.

It was created in 2003 from parts of Mississauga Centre and Mississauga West ridings.

It consisted of the part of the City of Mississauga bounded by a line drawn from the southwestern city limit northeast along Britannia Road West, southeast along Erin Mills Parkway, northeast along Eglinton Avenue West, southeast along Mavis Road, southwest along the Queensway West, west along the Credit River and southwest along Dundas Street West to the city limit.

In 2018, the district was dissolved into Mississauga—Erin Mills, Mississauga Centre and Mississauga—Lakeshore.

== Members of Provincial Parliament ==
Mississauga—Erindale
Assembly	Years	Member	Party
Riding created from Mississauga Centre and Mississauga West
39th	2007–2011	Harinder Takhar	Liberal
40th	2011–2014	Harinder Takhar	Liberal
41st	2014–2018	Harinder Takhar	Liberal
Riding dissolved into Mississauga—Erin Mills, Mississauga Centre and Mississauga—Lakeshore

== Election results ==
2014 Ontario general election
Party	Candidate	Votes	%	±%
Liberal	Harinder Takhar	25,356	48.98	+3.96
Progressive Conservative	Jeff White	15,474	29.89	–5.81
New Democratic	Michelle Bilek	7,730	14.93	–2.09
Green	Vivek Gupta	1,216	2.35	+0.48
Libertarian	Christopher Jewell	873	1.69	–
None of the Above	Greg Vezina	641	1.24	–
Family Coalition	Nabila Kiyani	474	0.92	–
Total valid votes		51,764	98.83	
Total rejected, unmarked and declined ballots		614	1.17	+0.88
Turnout		52,378	46.90	+2.99
Eligible voters		111,690		
Liberal hold		Swing		+4.88
Source: Elections Ontario

2011 Ontario general election
Party	Candidate	Votes	%	±%
Liberal	Harinder Takhar	20,552	45.03	–2.82
Progressive Conservative	David Brown	16,294	35.70	+2.59
New Democratic	Michelle Bilek	7,768	17.02	+5.79
Green	Otto Casanova	853	1.87	–5.95
Freedom	Gerald Jackson	176	0.39	–
Total valid votes		45,643	99.71	
Total rejected, unmarked and declined ballots		134	0.29	–0.85
Turnout		45,777	43.91	–3.17
Eligible voters		104,254		
Liberal hold		Swing		–2.70
Source: Elections Ontario

2007 Ontario general election
Party	Candidate	Votes	%
Liberal	Harinder Takhar	21,551	47.85
Progressive Conservative	David Brown	14,913	33.11
New Democratic	Shaila Kibria	5,056	11.23
Green	Richard Pietro	3,521	7.82
Total valid votes		45,041	98.86
Total rejected, unmarked and declined ballots		521	1.14
Turnout		45,562	47.08
Eligible voters		96,771	
Liberal pickup new district.			
Source: Elections Ontario

== 2007 electoral reform referendum ==
2007 Ontario electoral reform referendum
Side	Votes	%
First Past the Post	27,113	62.2
Mixed member proportional	16,447	37.8
Total valid votes	43,560	100.0

== Sources ==
- Elections Ontario Past Election Results
