= Mississauga—Streetsville (provincial electoral district) =

Provincial electoral district in Ontario, Canada

Coordinates: 43.595°N 79.745°W

Ontario electoral district
- Location in Mississauga

Provincial electoral district
- Legislature: Legislative Assembly of Ontario
MPP
Nina Tangri
Progressive Conservative
- District created: 2003
- First contested: 2007
- Last contested: 2025

Demographics
- Population (2016): 118,305
- Electors (2018): 87,225
- Area (km²): 47
- Pop. density (per km²): 2,517.1
- Census division: Peel
- Census subdivision: Mississauga

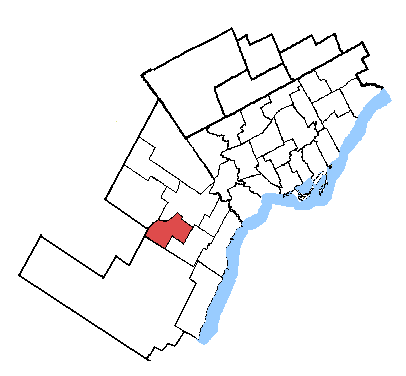
Mississauga—Streetsville 2003 to 2015

Mississauga—Streetsville is a provincial electoral district in Ontario, Canada, that has been represented in the Legislative Assembly of Ontario since 2007. This riding is centred on the villages of Streetsville and Meadowvale.

Mississauga—Streetsville is one of the most affluent ridings in Ontario, along with Mississauga—Erindale and Mississauga South.

== Riding history ==
It was created in 2003 from parts of Brampton West—Mississauga and Mississauga West ridings.

It consists of the part of the city of Mississauga bounded by a line drawn from the northwestern city limit southeast along Mississauga Road, northeast along Highway 401, southeast along Mavis Road, southwest along Britannia Road West, southeast along Terry Fox Way, southwest along Eglinton Avenue West, northwest along Erin Mills Parkway, southwest along Britannia Road West to the western city limit and back northwest.

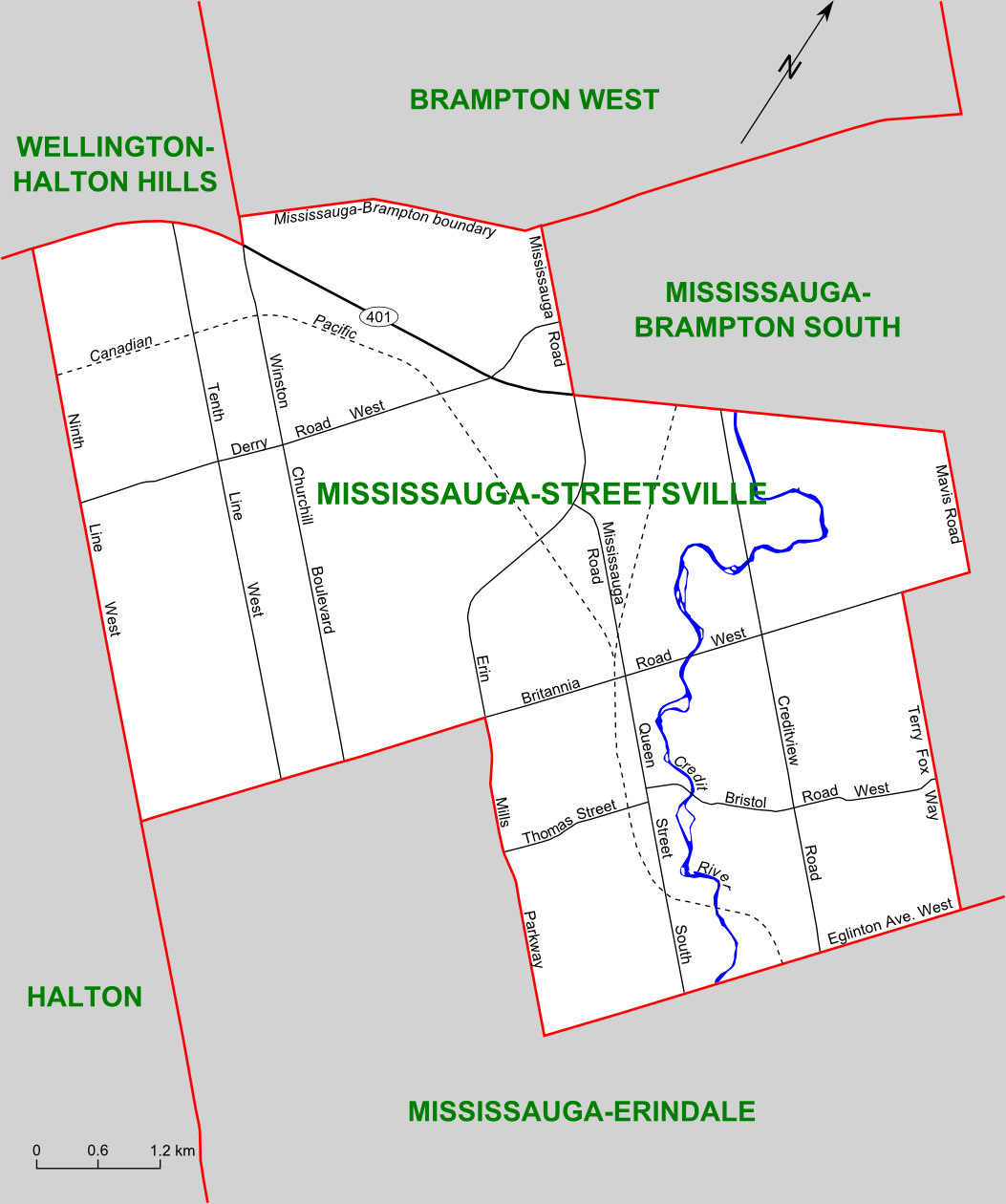
Map of Mississauga-Streetsville

== Members of Provincial Parliament ==
Mississauga—Streetsville
Assembly	Years	Member	Party
Riding created from Brampton West—Mississauga and Mississauga West
39th	2007–2011	Bob Delaney	Liberal
40th	2011–2014	Bob Delaney	Liberal
41st	2014–2018	Bob Delaney	Liberal
42nd	2018–2022	Nina Tangri	Progressive Conservative
43rd	2022–2025	Nina Tangri	Progressive Conservative
44th	2025–present	Nina Tangri	Progressive Conservative

== Election results ==
Winning party in each polling division of Mississauga—Streetsville at the 2025 Ontario general election

2025 Ontario general election
Party	Candidate	Votes	%	±%
Progressive Conservative	Nina Tangri	19,118	47.71	+2.13
Liberal	Jill Promoli	17,297	43.17	+7.69
New Democratic	Shoaib Khawar	2,012	5.02	–6.97
Green	Chris Hill	1,012	2.53	–0.47
New Blue	Darryl Brothers	630	1.57	–0.37
Total valid votes		40,069	99.25	
Total rejected, unmarked and declined ballots		302	0.75	+0.41
Turnout		40,371	44.31	+1.64
Eligible voters		91,117		
Progressive Conservative hold		Swing		–2.78
Source: Elections Ontario

Winning party in each polling division of Mississauga—Streetsville at the 2022 Ontario general election

2022 Ontario general election
Party	Candidate	Votes	%	±%
Progressive Conservative	Nina Tangri	17,317	45.58	+2.05
Liberal	Jill Promoli	13,479	35.48	+9.75
New Democratic	Nicholas Rabba	4,554	11.99	–13.85
Green	Reead Rahamut	1,137	2.99	+0.18
New Blue	Amir Kendic	737	1.94	–
Ontario Party	Christine Oliver	484	1.27	–
None of the Above	Len Little	209	0.55	–0.92
Populist	Fourat Jajou	72	0.19	–
Total valid votes		37,989	99.66	
Total rejected, unmarked and declined ballots		130	0.34	–0.63
Turnout		38,119	42.67	–12.86
Eligible voters		89,334		
Progressive Conservative hold		Swing		–3.85
Source: Elections Ontario

2018 Ontario general election
Party	Candidate	Votes	%	±%
Progressive Conservative	Nina Tangri	20,879	43.53	+14.29
New Democratic	Jacqueline Gujarati	12,393	25.84	+12.32
Liberal	Bob Delaney	12,344	25.74	–25.39
Green	Abhijeet Manay	1,349	2.81	–1.09
None of the Above	Greg Vezina	704	1.47	–
Libertarian	Richard Levesque	295	0.62	–
Total valid votes		47,964	99.03	
Total rejected, unmarked and declined ballots		468	0.97	
Turnout		48,432	55.53	
Eligible voters		87,225		
Progressive Conservative notional gain from Liberal		Swing		+19.84
Source: Elections Ontario

2014 general election redistributed results
Party	Vote	%
Liberal	19,900	51.13
Progressive Conservative	11,381	29.24
New Democratic	5,260	13.52
Green	1,518	3.90
Others	861	2.21

2014 Ontario general election
Party	Candidate	Votes	%	±%
Liberal	Bob Delaney	22,587	52.57	+1.03
Progressive Conservative	Nina Tangri	12,060	28.07	–1.47
New Democratic	Anju Sikka	5,885	13.70	–1.53
Green	Scott Warner	1,566	3.64	–0.04
None of the Above	Alexander Vezina	524	1.22	–
Libertarian	David Walach	342	0.80	–
Total valid votes		42,964	98.87	
Total rejected, unmarked and declined ballots		492	1.13	+0.79
Turnout		43,456	46.76	+5.30
Eligible voters		92,937		
Liberal hold		Swing		+1.25
Source: Elections Ontario

2011 Ontario general election
Party	Candidate	Votes	%	±%
Liberal	Bob Delaney	18,591	51.54	–1.01
Progressive Conservative	Wafik Sunbaty	10,655	29.54	+0.61
New Democratic	Raed Ayad	5,494	15.23	+5.00
Green	Scott Warner	1,329	3.68	–3.90
Total valid votes		36,069	99.65	
Total rejected, unmarked and declined ballots		125	0.35	–0.24
Turnout		36,194	41.46	–4.17
Eligible voters		87,297		
Liberal hold		Swing		–0.81
Source: Elections Ontario

2007 Ontario general election
Party	Candidate	Votes	%
Liberal	Bob Delaney	20,264	52.55
Progressive Conservative	Nina Tangri	11,155	28.93
New Democratic	Gail McCabe	3,944	10.23
Green	Scott Warner	2,925	7.59
Family Coalition	Masood Atchekzai	274	0.71
Total valid votes		38,562	99.41
Total rejected, unmarked and declined ballots		228	0.59
Turnout		38,790	45.63
Eligible voters		85,011	
Liberal pickup new district.			
Source: Elections Ontario

== 2007 electoral reform referendum ==
2007 Ontario electoral reform referendum
Side	Votes	%
First Past the Post	23,193	61.7
Mixed member proportional	14,426	38.3
Total valid votes	37,619	100.0

== See also ==
- List of Ontario provincial electoral districts
- Canadian provincial electoral districts
