= 2020 Ontario Liberal Party leadership endorsements =

Notable individuals and entities

2020 Ontario Liberal Party leadership election
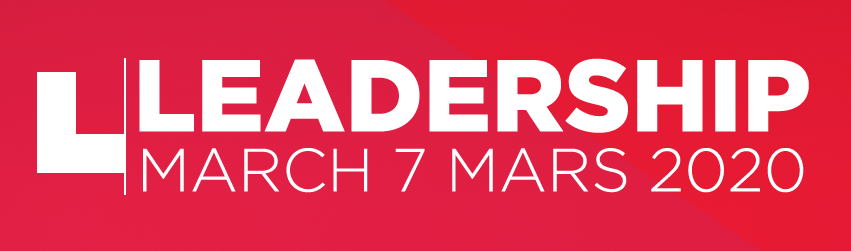
- Date: March 7, 2020
- Convention: International Centre, Mississauga, Ontario
- Resigning leader: Kathleen Wynne
- Won by: Steven Del Duca
- Ballots: 1
- Candidates: 6
- Entrance fee: $100,000 ($75,000 non-refundable)
- Spending limit: $900,000

This is a list of notable individuals and entities who provided endorsements to candidates during the 2020 Ontario Liberal Party leadership contest, or had their expression of support reported in the media. Titles or offices held listed are current as of the March 6, 2020 when the leadership convention was called to order. This list only includes individuals who held public elected offices, or individuals/entities of prominence sufficient for their expression of support to be reported by news media.

== Endorsements by caucus members ==
As typical in leadership contests of the two main political parties in Canada and other countries with government based on the Westminster model, the public support of incumbent caucus members were the endorsements most prized by the contestants and most often cited by journalists and pundits. The Ontario Liberal Party was decimated in the 2018 Ontario election, leaving only seven survivors in caucus. Among them, two were candidate themselves, two resigned by the fall of 2019 (their successors were not elected until a week prior to the convention), and both the outgoing leader Kathleen Wynne and interim leader John Fraser remained neutral throughout the contest. This left long time Thunder Bay MPP Michael Gravelle the only caucus endorsement up for grab in the traditional sense. The Del Duca campaign released Gravelle's endorsement a month prior to members voting.

The next most sought after groups were the former MPPs, especially those in office prior to the 2018 election, and the Liberals MPs representing Ontario electoral districts as they were the most likely figures to have on the ground political organization at their disposal. They also played an outsized role in the contest as party granted all former Ontario Liberal MPPs and all current Liberal MPs representing Ontario electoral districts status as voting delegate at the convention.

(Note: Endorsements from municipal elected officials and some other prominent individuals are listed below. They were not tallied as the diversity in types of offices and in sizes of electorate make a simple count of limited value.)	MPPs		MPs (Note: Former MPs unlike the other three categories were not automatic delegates, but as an easily distinguishable group was often cited by press.)	
(Note: Endorsements from municipal elected officials and some other prominent individuals are listed below. They were not tallied as the diversity in types of offices and in sizes of electorate make a simple count of limited value.)	Current	Former	Current	Former
Total available	7	~160	79	~270
Michael Coteau	1 (self)	9	5	5 (Note: Endorsement from an MP representing an electoral district in Quebec was not included in the tally.)
Steven Del Duca	1	34	22	11
Kate Graham		7	1	
Brenda Hollingsworth				
Mitzie Hunter	1 (self)	2	1	2
Alvin Tedjo		1		(Note: Endorsement from Conservative senator Hugh Segal was excluded.)

== Relevance to outcome ==
The competition for endorsements were largely among the three leading candidates. The campaigns of Del Duca, Coteau and Graham each released endorsements at regular intervals throughout fall of 2019 and early 2020, and leverage the endorsements at strategic junctures for public and members communication purposes. Hunter was not competitive on this front despite having been a caucus and cabinet colleague with many of the potential endorsers for an extended period like Del Duca and Coteau. The number of endorsements released by the contestants corresponded roughly to the voting results, with Del Duca laying claims to a bit over half of all the released endorsements, and Coteau's tallies being approximately a third of Del Duca's and Graham being approximately a quarter.

The regional distribution of the endorsements also provided early clues of the rival camps pockets of strengths. Del Duca's long list of endorsements from the 905 area reflected his campaign's dominance in that region. The endorsements released also foreshadowed Coteau's strong performance in Eastern Ontario and Scarborough, Graham's firm grip of the area surrounding her London home base, and Hunter's surprise wins in certain electoral districts in the north.

Uniquely, Coteau and Del Duca were each endorsed by a municipal politician that became a Conservative MPPs just a few years later: Coteau was endorsed by Toronto School Trustee David Smith, who would become MPP for Scarborough Centre just two years later in the 2022 provincial election, while Del Duca was endorsed by Milton councilor Zee Hamid, who would go on to win the 2024 Milton by-election and would join the Ford ministry as Associate Solicitor General in March 2025.

== Michael Coteau ==
Coteau claimed the second longest list of endorsements, with nine former MPPs (six of them having served under Peterson's leadership in the 1980s), six current MPs and five former MPs, and more than a dozen municipal elected officials, leveraging the network he built over a long period as a Liberal activist before holding public offices.

=== Former MPPs ===
Central
- Hon. Sheila Copps (Hamilton Centre 1981–84, 1982 leadership contestant, MP for Hamilton East 1984–2004, Deputy Prime Minister 1993–97, federal cabinet minister 1993–2003, 1990 & 2003 federal leadership contestant)
- Jennifer Mossop (Stoney Creek 2003–07)
- Steven Offer (Mississauga North 1985–95, Solicitor General 1989–90)

East

- Richard Patten (Ottawa Cantre 1987–1990, 1995–2007, cabinet minister 1987–90)
Southwest
- Carol Mitchell (Huron—Bruce 2003–11, agriculture minister 2010–11)
- Robert Nixon (Brant 1962–91, party leader 1967–76, Deputy Premier & Treasurer 1985–90)
- Jack Riddell (Huron–Middlesex 1973–90, agriculture minister 1985–89)

Toronto

- Arthur Potts (Beaches–East York 2014–18)
- Murad Velshi (Don Mills 1987–90)

=== MPs ===
Toronto
- Shaun Chen (Scarborough North since 2015, Toronto District School Board Trustee 2006–15 & Chair 2014–15)
- Yasmin Ratansi (Don Valley East 2004–11 & since 2015)
- Adam Vaughan (Spadina—Fort York since 2014, Toronto City Councillor 2006–14)
- Salma Zahid (Scarborough Centre since 2015)
Central
- Majid Jowhari (Richmond Hill since 2015)

Outside of Ontario

- Greg Fergus (Hull—Aylmer, QC since 2015, former National Director of the Liberal Party of Canada)

=== Former federal parliamentarians ===
(Plus: Copps listed under former MPPs)

East
- Ted Hsu (Kingston and the Islands 2011–15)

Southwest

- Ovid Jackson (Bruce–Grey–Owen Sound 1994–2004)
- Hon. Jerry Pickard (Chatham-Kent—Essex 1988–06)
Toronto
- Hon. David Collenette (Don Valley East 1993–2004 and York East 1974–79 & 1980–84, cabinet minister 1983–84, 1993–96, 1997–2003)
- Michelle Simson (Former MP for Scarborough–Southwest)

=== Municipal elected officials ===
Central
- Loralea Carruthers (East Gwillimbury councillor since 2004)
- Nokha Dakroub, (Peel District School Board trustee since 2014)
- Adam Moote (Welland councillor since 2018)
- Raj Sandhu (Bradford West Gwillimbury councillor since 2010)
- Dave Neeson (Georgina councillor)
East
- Donna Blackburn (Ottawa-Carleton District School Board Trustee since 2010)
- Eli El–Chantiry (City of Ottawa councillor)

Southwest

- Selwyn Hicks (Grey County warden)

Toronto

- Josh Matlow (Toronto City Councillor for Toronto—St. Paul's since 2010, Toronto District School Board Trustee 2003–10)
- David Smith (Note: later elected as a Progressive Conservative MPP) (Toronto District School Board Trustee for Scarborough Centre since 2010)

=== Former municipal elected officials ===
Central
- Larry Di Ianni (Mayor of Hamilton 2003–06, Hamilton City Councillor 2000–03, Stoney Creek Councillor 1982–2000)
Toronto
- Jon Burnside (Toronto City Councillor for Don Valley West 2014–18)
- John Campbell (Toronto City Councillor for Etobicoke Centre 2014–18, Toronto District School Board Trustee 2003–10 & chair)
- Gerri Gershon (Toronto District School Board Trustee 1975–2018)
- Bruce Davis (Toronto District School Board Trustee 2000–10–2018 & Chair)

=== Other prominent individuals ===
- Alfred Apps, former president of the Liberal Party of Canada
- David Gourlay, Ottawa Civics and Sports Leader
- Greg MacEachern, political commentator on CTV News Channel's Power Play
- Bruce McIntosh, Past President of the Ontario Autism Coalition

== Steven Del Duca ==
Del Duca was endorsed by Michael Gravelle, the most senior member of caucus, and essentially the only caucus endorsement up for grab. He was also endorsed by the lion share of the fellow former MPPs who served in the McGuinty-Wynne era, and the lion share of the sitting federal MPs.

=== MPPs ===
- Michael Gravelle (Thunder Bay—Superior North since 1995, cabinet minister 2007–18)

=== Former MPPs ===
(Plus: Dong & Jaczek listed under current MPs, Mauro under current municipal officials)

Central
- Granville Anderson (Durham 2014–18)
- Chris Ballard (Newmarket—Aurora 2014–18, cabinet minister 2016–18)
- Michael Chan (Markham—Unionville 2007–18, cabinet minister 2007–18)
- Dipika Damerla (Mississauga East—Cooksville 2011–18, cabinet minister 2014–18, current Mississauga City Councillor)
- Bob Delaney (Mississauga—Streetsville 2003–18)
- Joe Dickson (Ajax—Pickering 2007–18)
- Kevin Flynn (Oakville 2003–18, cabinet minister 2014–18, Oakville Regional & Town Councillor 1985–2003)
- Ann Hoggarth (Barrie 2014–18)
- Harinder Malhi (Brampton—Springdale 2014–18, cabinet minister 2018)
- Amrit Mangat (Mississauga—Brampton South 2011–18)
- Reza Moridi (Richmond Hill 2007–18, cabinet minister 2013–18)
- Greg Sorbara (Vaughan 1985-95 & 2001–12, cabinet minister 1985-90 & 2003–07, 1992 leadership contestant, Party President 1999–2003)
- Harinder Takhar (Mississauga—Erindale 2003–18, cabinet minister 2003–13, 2013 leadership candidate)

East

- Hon. Don Boudria (Prescott and Russell 1981–84, MP for Glengarry–Prescott–Russell 1984–2006, federal cabinet minister 1996–2003)
- Grant Crack (Glengarry—Prescott—Russell 2011–18)
- Sophie Kiwala (Kingston and the Islands 2014–18)
- Jeff Leal (Peterborough 2003–18, cabinet minister 2013–18, Peterborough City Councillor 1985–2003)
- Lou Rinaldi (Northumberland—Quinte West 2003-11 & 2014–18, Mayor of Brighton 2000–03)
North
- Rick Bartolucci (Sudbury 1995–2014, cabinet minister 2003–13)
- David Orazietti (Sault Ste. Marie 2003–17, cabinet minister 2013–16, Sault Ste. Marie City Councillor 1997–2003)

Southwest

- Murray Elston (Huron—Bruce 1981–94, cabinet minister 1985–90, interim party leader 1991, runner-up of 1992 leadership contest)
- Dave Levac (Brant 1999–2018, Speaker 2011–18)
- Steve Peters (Elgin—Middlesex—London 1999–2011, Speaker 2007–11, cabinet minister 2003–07, Mayor of St. Thomas 1991–99)
- Khalil Ramal (London-Fanshawe 2003–11)
- Liz Sandals (Guelph 2003–2018, cabinet minister 2013–18)
- Daiene Vernile (Kitchener Centre 2014–18, cabinet minister 2018)

Toronto

- Donna Cansfield (Etobicoke Centre 2003–14, cabinet minister 2005–10, Toronto District School Board Trustee 1997-2003 and Chair 2001–03, Etobicoke Board of Education Trustee 1988–97)
- Eric Hoskins (St. Paul's 2009–18, cabinet minister 2010–18, 2013 leadership candidate)
- Peter Milczyn (Etobicoke—Lakeshore 2014–18, cabinet minister 2017–18, Toronto City Councillor 2000–14, Etobicoke City Councillor 1994–98)
- Mario Sergio (York West 1995–2018, cabinet minister 2013–16, North York/Toronto City Councillor 1978–95)
- George Smitherman (Toronto Centre 1999–2010, cabinet minister 2003-09 and Deputy Premier 2006–09)

=== MPs ===
Central
- Bob Bratina (Hamilton East—Stoney Creek since 2015, Mayor of Hamilton 2010–14, Hamilton City Councillor 2004–10)
- Helena Jaczek (Markham—Stouffville since 2019, MPP for Oak Ridges—Markham 2007–18, provincial cabinet minister 2014–18)
- Iqra Khalid (Mississauga—Erin Mills since 2015)
- Ruby Sahota (Brampton North since 2015, chair of the Federal Liberal Ontario Caucus since 2017)
- Ramesh Sangha (Brampton Centre since 2015)
- Hon. Deb Schulte (King—Vaughan since 2015, cabinet minister since 2019)
- Maninder Sidhu (Brampton East since 2019)
- Sonia Sidhu (Brampton South since 2015)
- Gagan Sikand (Mississauga—Streetsville since 2015)
- Francesco Sorbara (Vaughan—Woodbridge since 2015)
East
- Chandra Arya (Nepean since 2015)
- Francis Drouin (Glengarry—Prescott—Russell since 2015)
- Neil Ellis (Bay of Quinte since 2015, Mayor of Belleville 2006–14)

North

- Marc Serré (Nickel Belt since 2015)

Southwest

- Peter Fragiskatos (London North Centre since 2015)
- Lloyd Longfield (Guelph since 2015)
- Tim Louis (Kitchener—Conestoga since 2019)
- Bryan May (Cambridge since 2015)
- Raj Saini (Kitchener Centre since 2015)

Toronto

- Han Dong (Don Valley North since 2019, MPP for Trinity—Spadina 2014–18)
- James Maloney (Etobicoke-Lakeshore since 2015, chair of the Federal Liberal Toronto Caucus)
- Hon. Judy Sgro (Humber River—Black Creek since 1999, federal Minister of Immigration and Citizenship 2003–05, Toronto City Councillor 1998–99, Metro Councillor 1994–97, North York Councillor 1987–94)

=== Former federal parliamentarians ===
(Plus: Boudria listed under former MPPs, Mitchell listed under current municipal officials)

Central
- Sarkis Assadourian (Brampton Centre 1997–2004, for Don Valley North 1993–97)
- Colleen Beaumier (Brampton West 1993–2008)
- Hon. Gurbax Singh Malhi (Bramalea—Gore—Malton 1993–2011)

East

- Mike Bossio (Hastings—Lennox and Addington 2015–19)
- Kim Rudd (Northumberland—Peterborough South 2015–19)
Toronto
- Hon. Sarmite Bulte (Parkdale—High Park 1997–2006)
- Hon. Maria Minna (Beaches—East York 1993–2011, cabinet minister 1999–2002)
- Hon. Allan Rock (Etobicoke Centre 1993–2004, cabinet minister 1993–2003, Ambassador to the United Nations 2004–06)
- Hon. David Smith✟ (Don Valley East 1980–84, cabinet minister 1983–84, senator for Cobourg 2002–16, National Liberal Campaign Co-chair in 1993/1997/2000/2008/2011) (Note: Passed away two weeks prior to convention)

=== Municipal elected officials ===
Central
- Zeeshan Hamid (Milton Town Councillor since 2010 & Halton Regional Councillor since 2018/)
- Alan Ho (Markham Councillor for Ward 2 since 2010, federal Liberal candidate for Markham—Unionville 2019)
- Marilyn Iafrate (Vaughan City Councillor since 2010, OLP candidate for King—Vaughan 2018)
- Rory Nisan,(Burlington City and Halton Region Councillor since 2018)
- Khalid Usman (Markham City Councillor since 2018)
- Lisa-Marie Wilson (Simcoe County District School Board Trustee since 2018, 2019 Federal Liberal candidate for Barrie-Innisfil)
East
- Guy Desjardins (Mayor of Clarence-Rockland since 2014)
- Denis Doyle (Mayor of Frontenac Islands since 2010, town councillor 2006–10)
- Wayne Hill (Kingston City Councillor for Lakeside since 2018)
- Hon. Andy Mitchell (Mayor of Selwyn since 2018, MP for Parry Sound-Muskoka 1993–2006, cabinet minister 1997–2006)

North

- Bill Mauro (Thunder Bay Mayor since 2018, MPP for Thunder Bay—Atikokan 2003–18, cabinet minister 2014–18, Thunder Bay Councillor 1997–2003)
- Ed Pearce (Elliot Lake City Councillor]] since 2018)

=== Former municipal elected officials ===
Central
- Nirmala Armstrong (Markham & York Regional Councillor 2014–18)
- Chris Emanuel (Newmarket Councillor 2002–14)
- Gerry Marshall (Mayor of Penetanguishene 2010–18, former Warden of Simcoe County, OLP candidate for Simcoe North 2018)
- Peter Silveira (Barrie City Councillor 2010–18)
East
- Jackie Lee Agnew (former Bonnechere Valley Township Councillor, OLP candidate for Renfrew-Nipissing-Pembroke 2018)
- Robert Quaiff (former Prince Edward County Mayor, OLP candidate for Bay of Quinte 2018)

Toronto

- Avtar Minhas (Toronto District School Board Trustee for Etobicoke North 2016–18)
- Jonathan Tsao (Toronto City Councillor for Ward 33 Don Valley East 2018)

=== Other notable endorsements ===
Other prominent individuals:
- Tyler Banham (President of Liberal Party of Canada (Ontario) (2012–19))
- Dr. Bob Bell (former Ontario Deputy Minister of Health and Long-term Care, former CEO of the University Health Network)
- Geoff Carpenter (President of Liberal Party of Canada (Ontario))
- Dr. Parminder Singh (founding host of Hockey Night in Canada Punjabi edition, 2018 provincial candidate in Brampton East)
Organizations
- Ontario Young Liberals

Media:

- The Toronto Star

== Kate Graham ==
Graham was backed by seven former MPPs, five of them former cabinet members. Her most prominent backers were her political mentor, former deputy premier Deb Matthews, and the former party leader Lyn MacLeod. She was also endorsed by Ted McMeekin, the leading left-winger in the McGuinty and Wynne ministries.

=== Former MPPs (7) ===
Central
- Eleanor McMahon (Burlington 2014–18, cabinet minister 2016–18)
- Ted McMeekin (Ancaster—Dundas—Flamborough—Westdale 2000–18, cabinet minister

North

- Lyn McLeod (Fort William 1987–1999, Thunder Bay—Atikokan 1999–2003, Ontario Liberal leader and Leader of the Opposition 1992–1996, cabinet minister 1987–1990)
- Monique Smith (Nipissing 2003–2011, cabinet minister 2007–2011)nister 2007–10, 2011–16, Mayor of Flamborough 1994–2000, former Hamilton City Councillor)
Southwest
- Pat Hoy (Chatham–Kent—Essex 1995–2011)
- Deb Matthews (London North Centre 2003–18, cabinet minister 2007–18 and Deputy Premier 2013–18)
- Doug Reycraft (Middlesex 1985–1990, Chief Government Whip 1987–1989, Mayor of Southwest Middlesex 2001–2014)

=== MPs (1) ===
- Kate Young (London West since 2015)

=== Municipal elected officials ===
Southwest
- Kelly Elliott (deputy mayor of Thames Centre)
- Jesse Helmer (London City Councillor since 2014, deputy mayor since 2018) (candidate's spouse)
- Arielle Kayabaga (London City Councillor since 2018)

Toronto

- Shelley Carroll (Toronto City Councillor for Don Valley North/Don Valley East since 2003, Toronto District School Board Trustee 2000–03)

=== Former municipal elected officials ===
- Joni Barchler (London City Councillor 2000–14, interim mayor 2014)
- Matt Brown (Mayor of London 2014–2018, London City Councillor 2010–14)
- Todd Case (Mayor of Warwick 2001–2018, Lambton County warden 2003, 2004, 2013–2014)

=== Other prominent individuals ===
- Doug Ferguson (President of Liberal Party of Canada 2008–09, 2011 federal candidate for London West)

== Brenda Hollingsworth ==
Hollingsworth did not release any endorsement.

== Mitzie Hunter ==
Hunter was backed by two former MPPs, her local MP, and two former MPs. The endorsement of future Timmins mayor Michelle Boileau was of unique significance due to the contest's weighted system and the absence of competing network said region.

=== Former MPPs (2) ===
- Alvin Curling (Scarborough–Rouge River/Scarborough North 1999–2005, cabinet minister 1985–89, Speaker 2003–05, Ambassador to the Dominican Republic 2005–06)
- Phil McNeely (Ottawa–Orléans 2003–14, Ottawa City Councillor for Cumberland 2000–03)

=== MPs ===
- Hon. John McKay (Scarborough–Guildwood since 1997)

=== Former federal parliamentarians ===
- Hon. Jean Augustine (Etobicoke–Lakeshore 1993–2006, federal cabinet minister 2002–04, Fairness Commissioner of Ontario 2007–15)
- Celina Caesar-Chavannes (Whitby 2015–2019)

=== Municipal elected officials ===
- Paul Ainslie (Toronto City Councillor, since 2006)
- Michelle Boileau (Councillor, City of Timmins)
- Rick Maloney (Councillor & Deputy Mayor, Town of Bracebridge)
- Kristen Parks (Hastings and Prince Edward District School Board Trustee)

=== Former municipal elected officials ===
Southwest
- Anne Marie Gillis (Sarnia City Councillor 2003–18, former deputy warden of Lambton County, 2014 provincial candidate for Sarnia–Lambton)
Toronto
- Beverley Salmon (North York City and Metro Toronto Councillor, 1985–1997)

== Alvin Tedjo ==
Alvin Tedjo was endorsed by Walt Elliot, former MPP for the seat which Tedjo contested in the 2018 election, and conservative senator Hugh Segal, who was not eligible to vote in the contest.

=== Former MPPs ===
- Walt Elliot (Halton North 1987–90)

=== Former federal parliamentarians ===
- Hon. Hugh Segal (Conservative Senator for Ontario 2005–2014, Chief of Staff to Prime Minister Brian Mulroney, Chief of Staff to Premier Bill Davis)

=== Municipal elected official ===
- Marc Laferriere (County of Brant Councillor since 2018)
- Sue Barnett (District School Board of Niagara Chair)

=== Former Municipal elected official ===
- Janet Gasparini (Greater Sudbury City Councillor 2003–10)
