= Ontario Council on Articulation and Transfer =

Ontario Council on Articulation and Transfer (ONCAT), formerly known as the College University Consortium Council (CUCC), was established in 1996 by what is now the Ministry of Colleges and Universities. The council serves as an advisory body that helps in devising direct routes of transfers between postsecondary institutions for all students in Ontario, Canada.

Ontario has a binary system of postsecondary education that consists of colleges and universities. The structure has been static and intentional for long, with only minimal mobility to offer between the two sides, which created resistance and, therefore, demanded the development of a more articulated system. The Provincial government in 1996 initiated the CUCC program. The council offers voluntary memberships to all postsecondary institutions. CUCC aids in the creation of a bridge program while maintaining the autonomy of colleges and universities according to the created agreement.

In 2011, John Milloy announced his plans to construct a new centralized system of credit transfer which led to the evolution of CUCC into “Ontario Council on Articulation and Transfer” (ONCAT). This council has an implied jurisdiction over OCUTG; currently known as the “Ontario Postsecondary Transfer Guide” (OPTG). ONCAT was created to enhance academic pathways and reduce barriers faced by students who are looking to transfer between public colleges and universities, and indigenous institutes in Ontario.

== Council members ==
In the year 2002-2003, the Council was composed of the following members:

- Dr Douglas Auld – President, Co-Chair, Loyalist College
- Professor Bonnie Paterson – President, Co-Chair, Trent University
- Ms. Barbara Taylor – President, Canadore Colleges
- Dr Robert Rosehart – President, Wilfrid Laurier University
- Ms. Cindy Hazell – Vice President Academic, Seneca College
- Dr Fred A. Hall – Associate Vice President (Academic), McMaster University

== Mission statement ==
The main objective of ONCAT is to “facilitate, promote and coordinate joint education and training ventures that will: aid the transfer of students from sector to sector; facilitate the creation of joint programs between colleges and universities; and further the development of a more seamless continuum of postsecondary education in Ontario.”

The council aims to expand the credit transfer options for students and help them make informed decisions related to postsecondary education. This aim complies with the economic plan of Ontario’s government.

ONCAT was also created as an effort to combine liberal educational courses in universities with applied studies courses taught in community colleges.

== Contributions ==
In 1997, the consortium launched the “Ontario College-University Transfer Guide” on the web, which provides detailed information related to credit transfer policies, agreements, and articulation along with the specifics regarding collaborative programs between Ontario universities and colleges.

In 1999, CUCC developed a template that enabled participating institutions with the freedom to enter data that covered out-of-province agreements.

In 2003, the council commissioned a policy paper that presented the challenges found within the classification system for postsecondary education used by Statistics Canada, the national reporting and data collection agency over the last two decades proposing substantial revisions.

In 2019, ONCAT funded the research in collaboration with the “Natural Sciences and Engineering Research Council (NSERC)” called “Automating Articulation: Applying Natural Language Processing to Post-Secondary Credit Transfer”.
