= Kitchener Centre =

Kitchener Centre could refer to:

- Kitchener Centre (federal electoral district)
- Kitchener Centre (provincial electoral district)
