= Kitchener (provincial electoral district) =

Ontario electoral district

Defunct provincial electoral district
- Legislature: Legislative Assembly of Ontario
- District created: 1967
- District abolished: 1996
- First contested: 1967
- Last contested: 1995

Kitchener was an electoral riding in Ontario, Canada. It existed from 1967 to 1999, when it was abolished when ridings were redistributed to match their federal counterpart. It consisted of the city of Kitchener, Ontario.

== History ==
Liberal Jim Breithaupt was the longest serving former Member of Provincial Parliament (MPP) for Kitchener since Canadian Confederation in 1867. Liberal David R. Cooke held the seat for two terms between 1985 and 1990. Will Ferguson took the seat in Bob Rae's New Democratic Party landslide election in 1990. Ferguson resigned midterm and Progressive Conservative Wayne Wettlaufer won the 1994 by-election and held the seat until 1999 when the seat was redistributed into Kitchener Centre and Kitchener—Waterloo. Wettlaufer lost his seat in the provincial election of 2003.

== Members ==
Kitchener
| Assembly | Years | Member | Party |
|---|---|---|---|
Riding created out of Waterloo North and Waterloo South
| 28th | 1967–1971 | Jim Breithaupt | Liberal |
| 29th | 1971–1975 | Jim Breithaupt | Liberal |
| 30th | 1975–1977 | Jim Breithaupt | Liberal |
| 31st | 1977–1981 | Jim Breithaupt | Liberal |
| 32nd | 1981–1985 | Jim Breithaupt | Liberal |
| 33rd | 1985–1987 | David R. Cooke | Liberal |
| 34th | 1987–1990 | David R. Cooke | Liberal |
| 33rd | 1990–1994 | Will Ferguson | New Democratic |
| 33rd | 1994–1995 | Wayne Wettlaufer | Progressive Conservative |
| 34th | 1995–1999 | Wayne Wettlaufer | Progressive Conservative |
Riding dissolved into Kitchener Centre and Kitchener—Waterloo

== Election results ==
1995 Ontario general election
| Party | Candidate | Votes | % | ±% |
|---|---|---|---|---|
| Progressive Conservative | Wayne Wettlaufer | 13,374 | 40.15 | +21.85 |
| Liberal | Bryan Stortz | 9,992 | 30.00 | +1.07 |
| New Democratic | Sandy Ellis | 6,998 | 21.01 | –25.81 |
| Family Coalition | Louis Reitzel | 2,111 | 6.34 | +0.39 |
| Independent | Bob Oberholtzer | 612 | 1.84 | – |
| Independent | Frank A. Kerek | 223 | 0.67 | – |
| Total valid votes | | 33,310 | 98.82 | |
| Total rejected, unmarked and declined ballots | | 398 | 1.18 | –0.12 |
| Turnout | | 33,708 | 60.12 | –2.78 |
| Eligible voters | | 56,066 | | |
| Progressive Conservative gain from New Democratic | | Swing | | +23.83 |
Source: Elections Ontario

1990 Ontario general election
| Party | Candidate | Votes | % | ±% |
|---|---|---|---|---|
| New Democratic | Will Ferguson | 15,750 | 46.82 | +18.29 |
| Liberal | David R. Cooke | 9,731 | 28.93 | –23.42 |
| Progressive Conservative | Ian Matthew | 6,157 | 18.30 | +3.91 |
| Family Coalition | John J. Meenan | 2,002 | 5.95 | +2.21 |
| Total valid votes | | 33,640 | 98.70 | |
| Total rejected, unmarked and declined ballots | | 443 | 1.30 | +0.66 |
| Turnout | | 34,083 | 62.90 | +6.41 |
| Eligible voters | | 54,184 | | |
| New Democratic gain from Liberal | | Swing | | +20.85 |
Source: Elections Ontario

1987 Ontario general election
| Party | Candidate | Votes | % | ±% |
|---|---|---|---|---|
| Liberal | David R. Cooke | 15,373 | 52.35 | +5.48 |
| New Democratic | Sue Coulter | 8,379 | 28.53 | +9.69 |
| Progressive Conservative | Barbara Fraser | 4,226 | 14.39 | –17.88 |
| Family Coalition | John J. Meenan | 1,100 | 3.75 | – |
| Independent | Ed Halbach | 290 | 0.99 | –0.52 |
| Total valid votes | | 29,368 | 99.36 | |
| Total rejected ballots | | 188 | 0.64 | +0.17 |
| Turnout | | 29,556 | 56.49 | –2.01 |
| Eligible voters | | 52,321 | | |
| Liberal hold | | Swing | | –2.11 |
Source: Elections Ontario

1985 Ontario general election
| Party | Candidate | Votes | % | ±% |
|---|---|---|---|---|
| Liberal | David R. Cooke | 14,066 | 46.86 | –4.11 |
| Progressive Conservative | Don Travers | 9,684 | 32.26 | –0.05 |
| New Democratic | Tim Little | 5,654 | 18.84 | +2.13 |
| Independent | Ed Halbach | 453 | 1.51 | – |
| Independent | Albert Norris | 157 | 0.52 | – |
| Total valid votes | | 30,014 | 99.53 | |
| Total rejected ballots | | 141 | 0.47 | +0.10 |
| Turnout | | 30,155 | 58.50 | +7.73 |
| Eligible voters | | 51,551 | | |
| Liberal hold | | Swing | | –2.03 |
Source: Elections Ontario

1981 Ontario general election
| Party | Candidate | Votes | % | ±% |
|---|---|---|---|---|
| Liberal | Jim Breithaupt | 12,592 | 50.98 | –1.08 |
| Progressive Conservative | Morley Rosenberg | 7,982 | 32.32 | +7.38 |
| New Democratic | Ian Macfarlane | 4,126 | 16.70 | –5.90 |
| Total valid votes | | 24,700 | 99.64 | |
| Total rejected ballots | | 90 | 0.36 | –0.04 |
| Turnout | | 24,790 | 50.76 | –8.64 |
| Eligible voters | | 48,835 | | |
| Liberal hold | | Swing | | –4.23 |
Source: Elections Ontario

1977 Ontario general election
| Party | Candidate | Votes | % | ±% |
|---|---|---|---|---|
| Liberal | Jim Breithaupt | 14,425 | 52.06 | +7.23 |
| Progressive Conservative | Sid McLennan | 6,910 | 24.94 | –3.69 |
| New Democratic | Cam Conrad | 6,264 | 22.61 | –2.59 |
| Communist | Evelina Pan | 111 | 0.40 | –0.95 |
| Total valid votes | | 27,710 | 99.60 | |
| Total rejected ballots | | 111 | 0.40 | –0.11 |
| Turnout | | 27,821 | 59.40 | –4.01 |
| Eligible voters | | 46,835 | | |
| Liberal hold | | Swing | | +5.46 |
Source: Elections Ontario

1975 Ontario general election
| Party | Candidate | Votes | % | ±% |
|---|---|---|---|---|
| Liberal | Jim Breithaupt | 13,036 | 44.83 | +2.53 |
| Progressive Conservative | Bill Pernfuss | 8,326 | 28.63 | –1.24 |
| New Democratic | Meg Young | 7,327 | 25.20 | –1.81 |
| Communist | Evelina Pan | 392 | 1.35 | – |
| Total valid votes | | 29,081 | 99.49 | |
| Total rejected ballots | | 148 | 0.51 | +0.17 |
| Turnout | | 29,229 | 63.41 | –9.21 |
| Eligible voters | | 46,096 | | |
| Liberal hold | | Swing | | +1.88 |
Source: Elections Ontario

1971 Ontario general election
| Party | Candidate | Votes | % | ±% |
|---|---|---|---|---|
| Liberal | Jim Breithaupt | 19,168 | 42.30 | +8.01 |
| Progressive Conservative | Edith MacIntosh | 13,535 | 29.87 | –0.27 |
| New Democratic | George Mitchell | 12,237 | 27.00 | –7.11 |
| Independent | Ian Dennison | 379 | 0.84 | – |
| Total valid votes | | 45,319 | 99.67 | |
| Total rejected ballots | | 151 | 0.33 | –0.48 |
| Turnout | | 45,470 | 72.62 | +7.93 |
| Eligible voters | | 62,614 | | |
| Liberal hold | | Swing | | +4.14 |
Source: Elections Ontario

1967 Ontario general election
| Party | Candidate | Votes | % |
|---|---|---|---|
| Liberal | Jim Breithaupt | 10,350 | 34.29 |
| New Democratic | Morley Rosenberg | 10,298 | 34.12 |
| Progressive Conservative | Keith Butler | 9,096 | 30.13 |
| Social Credit | Harvey Lainson | 441 | 1.46 |
| Total valid votes | | 30,185 | 99.19 |
| Total rejected ballots | | 246 | 0.81 |
| Turnout | | 30,431 | 64.69 |
| Eligible voters | | 47,040 | |
| Liberal pickup new district. | | | |
Source: Elections Ontario
