= 2023 Kitchener Centre provincial by-election =

Provincial by-election in Ontario, Canada

- November 30, 2023

Riding of Kitchener Centre
- Turnout: 27.28% (▼18.94)
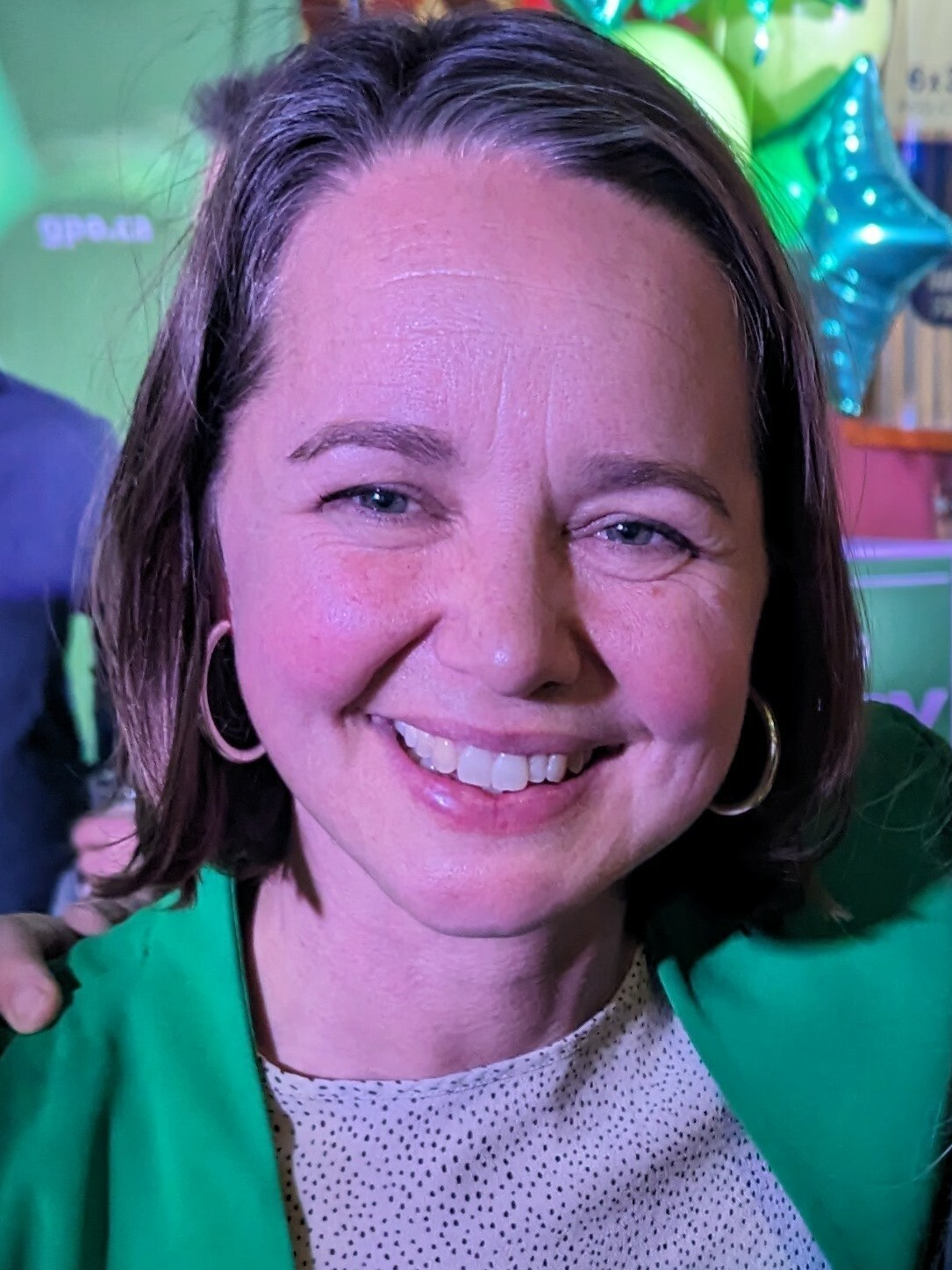
	First party	Second party
		NDP
Candidate	Aislinn Clancy	Debbie Chapman
Party	Green	New Democratic
Popular vote	11,334	6,312
Percentage	47.99%	26.73%
Swing	▲35.19	▼13.86
	Third party	Fourth party
	PC	LIB
Candidate	Rob Elliott	Kelly Steiss
Party	Progressive Conservative	Liberal
Popular vote	3,109	1,821
Percentage	13.16%	7.71%
Swing	▼13.51	▼7.01
MPP before election
Laura Mae Lindo
New Democratic
Elected MPP
Aislinn Clancy
Green

A by-election was held in the provincial riding of Kitchener Centre in Ontario on November 30, 2023, to elect a new member of the Legislative Assembly of Ontario following the resignation of NDP MPP Laura Mae Lindo.

Kitchener City Councillor Aislinn Clancy gained the seat for the Ontario Greens. Clancy is the second member of the Ontario Greens to be elected in the province, following party leader Mike Schreiner. In addition, the by-election featured 18 candidates, the largest-ever number of candidates in an Ontario riding election. Clancy defeated fellow city councillor Debbie Chapman who was the NDP candidate.

== Results ==
Ontario provincial by-election, November 30, 2023: Kitchener Centre Resignation of Laura Mae Lindo
Party	Candidate	Votes	%	±%
Green	Aislinn Clancy	11,334	47.99	+35.19
New Democratic	Debbie Chapman	6,312	26.73	–13.86
Progressive Conservative	Rob Elliott	3,109	13.16	–13.51
Liberal	Kelly Steiss	1,821	7.71	–7.01
New Blue	Paul Simoes	532	2.25	–2.96
Libertarian	Gene Balfour	178	0.75	–
None of the Above	Mark Dickson	61	0.26	–
Special Needs	Lionel Wayne Poizner	48	0.20	–
Electoral Reform Party	Peter House	43	0.18	–
Independent	Albert Michel Benlolo	34	0.14	–
Public Benefit Party	Jonathan Davis	33	0.14	–
Independent	Patrick Strzalkowski	23	0.10	–
Populist	Mario Greco	22	0.09	–
Independent	Paul Stewart	18	0.08	–
Independent	Ali Engering	16	0.07	–
Independent	John Turmel	13	0.06	–
Independent	Spencer Rocchi	11	0.05	–
People's Front	Raymond Samuels	8	0.03	–
Total valid votes		23,616	99.34	
Total rejected, unmarked and declined ballots		156	0.66	–0.01
Turnout		23,772	27.05	–19.16
Eligible voters		87,883		
Green gain from New Democratic		Swing		+24.53
Source: Elections Ontario

== See also ==
- List of Ontario by-elections
