= 2014 Waterloo Region municipal elections =

- October 27, 2014

The 2014 Waterloo Region municipal elections were held on October 27, 2014 in the Regional Municipality of Waterloo, Ontario, Canada, to elect Waterloo Regional Council, the mayors and city councils of Cambridge, Kitchener, North Dumfries, Waterloo, Wellesley, Wilmot, and Woolwich, the Waterloo Region District School Board (Public), the Waterloo Catholic District School Board, and the regional members of Conseil Scolaire de District Catholiques Centre-Sud and Conseil Scolaire Viamonde (Public). The election was held in conjunction with the provincewide 2014 municipal elections.

Names in bold denotes elected candidates.
(X) denotes incumbent.

== Waterloo Regional Council ==
=== Chair ===
Candidate	Vote	%
**Ken Seiling** (X)	63,885	59.07
Jay Aissa	25,615	23.68
Moira-Sharon Magee	4,877	4.51
Robert F. Milligan	4,708	4.35
John Wolf	3,918	3.62
Paul Myles	2,993	2.77
Oscar Cole-Amal	2,154	1.99

=== Council ===
Waterloo Regional Council includes the chair, the mayors of the seven constituent municipalities (see below) plus the following council races:

Candidate	Vote	%
**Cambridge (2 to be elected)**
**Karl Kiefer**	12,328	34.33
**Helen Jowett**	8,554	23.82
John Florence	6,401	17.83
Jane Brewer (X)	4,377	12.19
Kurt Ditner	2,842	7.92
Ron Koenderink	1,404	3.91
**Kitchener (4 to be elected)**
**Karen Redman**	28,616	23.48
**Tom Galloway** (X)	24,866	19.53
**Wayne Wettlaufer**	17,471	13.72
**Geoff Lorentz** (X)	17,005	13.36
Elizabeth Clarke	16,586	13.03
Cameron J. Dearlove	14,439	11.34
Greg Burns	8,331	6.54
**Waterloo (2 to be elected)**
**Sean Strickland** (X)	12,138	29.26
**Jane Mitchell** (X)	8,374	20.18
Andrew Telegdi	8,029	19.35
Karen Scian	7,851	18.92
Ed Korschewitz	2,964	7.14
Bob Oberholtzer	2,133	5.14

== Cambridge ==
=== Mayor ===
Mayoral Candidate	Vote	%
**Doug Craig** (X)	13,484	53.28
Linda Ann Whetham	4,556	18.00
Andrew Johnson	2,960	11.70
Sandra Hill	2,581	10.20
Harpinder Singh	642	2.54
Sardool Bhogal	592	2.34
Paul Tavares	493	1.95

== Kitchener ==
=== Mayor ===
Mayoral Candidate	Vote	%
**Berry Vrbanovic**	26,946	61.01
Dan Glenn-Graham	11,921	26.99
Peter Martin	3,898	8.83
Slavko Miladinovic	767	1.74
James Rhodes	634	1.44

== North Dumfries ==
=== Mayor ===
Mayoral Candidate	Vote	%
**Sue Foxton**	1,278	42.12
Kim Denouden	962	31.71
John Holman	794	26.17

== Waterloo ==
=== Mayor ===
Mayoral Candidate	Vote	%
**Dave Jaworsky**	14,103	55.26
Erika Traub	6,292	24.65
Dave MacDonald	4,432	17.36
Rami Said	696	2.73

== Wellesley ==
=== Mayor ===
Mayoral Candidate	Vote	%
**Joe Nowak**	1,301	56.69
Jim Olender	516	22.48
Paul Hergott	478	20.83

== Wilmot ==
=== Mayor ===
Mayoral Candidate	Vote	%
**Les Armstrong** (X)	3,382	56.08
Terry Broda	2,649	43.92

== Woolwich ==
=== Mayor ===
Mayoral Candidate	Vote	%
**Sandy Shantz**	4,431	66.33
Doug Hergott	887	13.28
Bonnie Bryant	851	12.74
Todd Cowan (X)	511	7.65
