= Will Ferguson (Ontario politician) =

Canadian politician (born 1954)

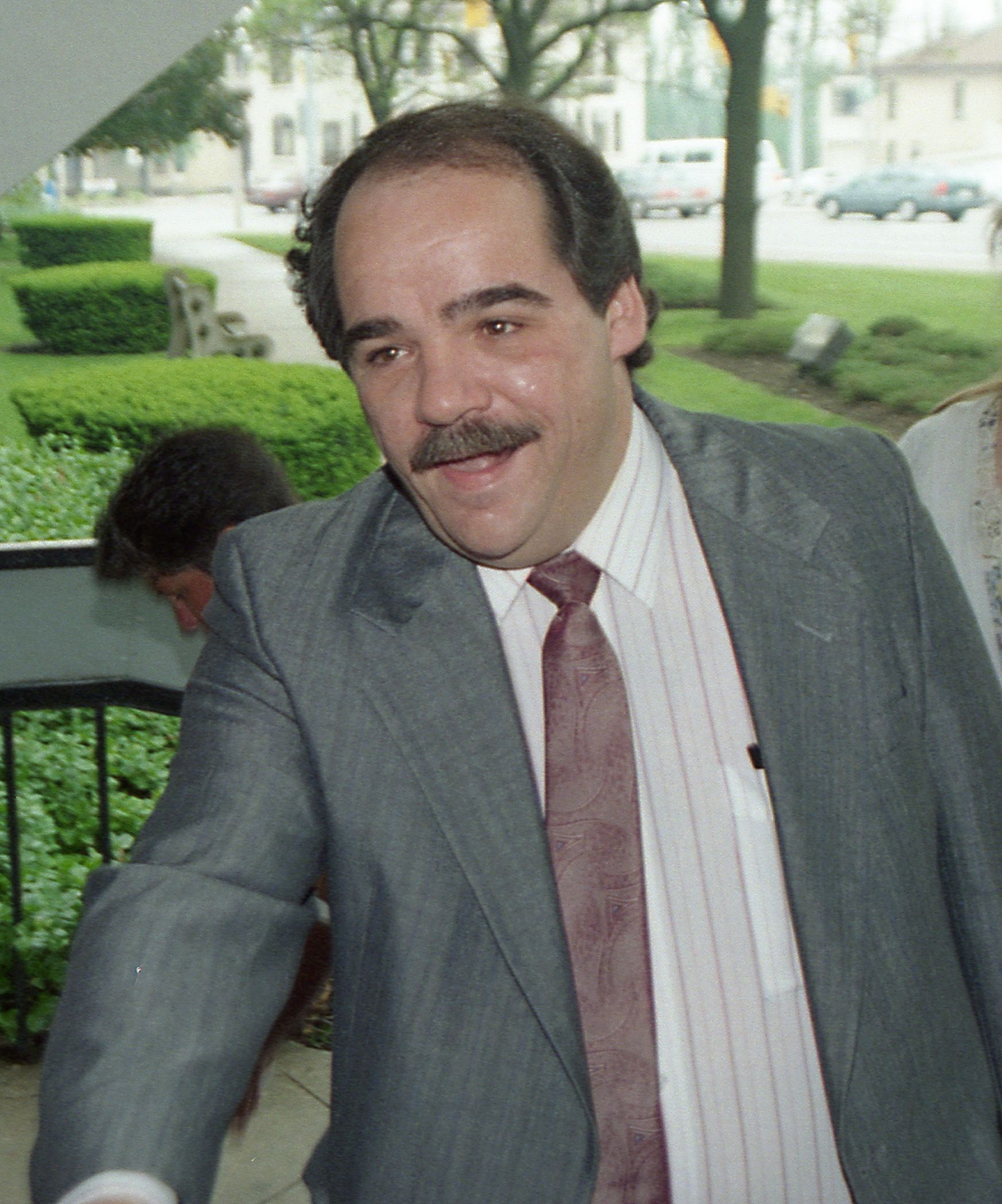

Ontario MPP
- In office 1990–1994
- Preceded by: David Cooke
- Succeeded by: Wayne Wettlaufer
- Constituency: Kitchener

Personal details
- Born: February 13, 1954 Kitchener, Ontario
- Died: July 22, 2011 (aged 57) Kitchener, Ontario
- Party: New Democrat (Note: Ferguson sat as an Independent member from 1993 to 1994.)
- Spouse: Janet
- Children: 2
- Occupation: Businessman

Willard Gerard Ferguson or William A. Ferguson (February 13, 1954 – July 22, 2011) was a Canadian politician in Ontario. He was a member of the Legislative Assembly of Ontario from 1990 to 1994, and served as Minister of Energy in the government of Bob Rae.

== Background ==
Ferguson was born in Kitchener. He was a male child in a set of fraternal triplets along with two sisters. His mother, Mary Ferguson had also given birth to twins two years earlier. He attended Conestoga College where he earned a diploma in social work. He worked at the Grandview girls' reform school in the 1970s, and was involved with the Big Brothers Association of Kitchener in 1982–83. He then worked as an employment Councillor at The Working Centre from 1984 to 1988, and was Director of Administration at Dusty's Disposal from 1989 to 1990.

Ferguson competed as an amateur boxer and earned a silver medal in the middle-weight division at the Ontario Winter Games in 1970. His first marriage was to Jeanette with whom he had a son. His son died of cancer at the age of eight. His second marriage to Janet, later produced a daughter.

== Politics ==
Ferguson ran for alderman for the Kitchener City Council in 1972 when he was only 18 years old and still in high school at Cameron Heights Collegiate Institute. He ran again in 1979 this time being elected. He remained as city councillor until his election to the provincial legislature in 1990. He was a champion representing the 'little guy' and on one occasion residents of his ward complained about dust coming from gravel being spread on the road. He requested the city spray water to keep the dust down but he was ignored. So he brought in a sack of gravel to a city council meeting and dumped the gravel into a bucket which generated a considerable amount of dust and his point was made.

Ferguson ran as a candidate of the federal New Democratic Party in the Canadian general election of 1984, but finished third in the riding of Kitchener behind winner John Reimer by 12,892 votes.

In 1990, Ferguson ran again, this time as the provincial NDP candidate in the riding of Kitchener defeating incumbent Liberal David Cooke by 6,019 votes.

He initially served as a parliamentary assistant to Dave Cooke, the Minister of Housing and Municipal Affairs and was promoted to Minister of Energy on July 31, 1991. In October 1991, Ferguson was involved in a minor controversy surrounding executive compensation at Ontario Hydro. He revealed in the legislature that the salary of the former chairman was $540,000. The Liberal opposition argued that this was a breach of privacy rules and that he should resign. Ferguson refused to resign and referred the issue to the Privacy Commissioner.

On February 13, 1992, Ferguson resigned from the provincial cabinet to deal with allegations that he had committed a sexual assault while working as a guard at Grandview. He was acquitted in 1994. From the time when he was charged to his acquittal he sat as an independent. After his acquittal he was reinstated by the NDP and was appointed as a parliamentary assistant to the Minister of Agriculture, Food and Rural Affairs.

He resigned from the legislature on October 8, 1994, in order to run for mayor of Kitchener but he was defeated. He also tried to get elected to the same council in a 2002 by-election but was again defeated.

=== Cabinet positions ===
Rae ministry, Province of Ontario (1990–1995)
Cabinet post (1)
Predecessor	Office	Successor
Jenny Carter	Minister of Energy; 1991–1992	Brian Charlton

== Later life ==
After leaving the legislature he held a number of jobs including town manager in northern communities including the hamlet of Grise Fiord, Nunavut. He also consulted on energy issues in South Africa. He struggled with alcoholism which escalated shortly after the death of his son. On Friday July 22, 2011, he experienced heart problems at his brother's place in Kitchener and died shortly thereafter. A memorial service was held at the St. Joseph's Church in Kitchener on July 26, 2011. On October 17, Queens Park honored Ferguson with a Parliamentary tribute for his service to the Legislature.
