= Jim Breithaupt =

Canadian politician (1934–2018)

Jim Breithaupt KStJ CD QC

Ontario MPP
- In office 1967–1985
- Preceded by: New riding
- Succeeded by: David Cooke
- Constituency: Kitchener

Personal details
- Born: September 7, 1934 Kitchener, Ontario
- Died: August 29, 2018 (aged 83) Kitchener, Ontario
- Party: Liberal
- Spouse: Jane Adamson
- Occupation: Lawyer
- Awards: Knight of Merit (Poland)

Military service
- Allegiance: Canadian
- Branch/service: Army
- Years of service: 1951-1975
- Rank: Lieutenant-Colonel
- Unit: Highland Fusiliers

James Roos Breithaupt (Note: popularly pronounced "bright-up".) KStJ CD QC (September 7, 1934 – August 29, 2018) was a Canadian politician. He served in the Legislative Assembly of Ontario from 1967 to 1984 as a member of the Liberal Party. He won a total of five elections, and was the longest serving former Member of Provincial Parliament (MPP) for Kitchener since Canadian Confederation in 1867.

== Background ==
Breithaupt was born in Kitchener, and was educated at the University of Western Ontario, the University of Toronto and Osgoode Hall Law School. He was called to the Ontario Bar in 1962, and worked as a barrister and solicitor. He was named a Queen's Counsel in 1975. Breithaupt was also active in the Canadian Army. An artillery and infantry officer, he was the Commanding Officer of The Royal Highland Fusiliers of Canada from 1971 to 1973 and then was the Senior Staff Officer to the Major General Reserves for Canada, completing 24 years of militia service.

He was the vice-chairman of the Board of Governors of Waterloo Lutheran University, and suggested the new name of "Wilfrid Laurier University" in 1973. He was then vice-chairman of the Waterloo Lutheran Seminary Board for a further six years. Between 1952 and 1982, he spent a total of thirty years on campus as a student, lecturer, Board Member and Vice-Chairman.

== Politics ==
Breithaupt was elected to the Ontario legislature in Kitchener at the 1967 provincial election, defeating New Democratic Party candidate Morley Rosenberg by 52 votes. He was re-elected with increased majorities in the elections of 1971, 1975, 1977, and 1981. Breithaupt served as financial and justice critic in the Liberal shadow cabinet for a number of years, and was Chairman of the Public Accounts Committee from 1968 to 1975, when he became the House Leader for the Liberal Opposition.

Liberal leader Stuart Smith resigned following the 1981 election, and Breithaupt entered the campaign to succeed him at the 1982 Ontario Liberal leadership convention. He was initially seen as one of the front-runners in a field of five candidates, but was kept off the campaign trail by a car accident. His wife, Jane, represented him at campaign meetings and rallies. Breithaupt placed fourth on the first ballot, and withdrew from the race. The winner was David Peterson.

Breithaupt resigned from the legislature on November 1, 1984, and was appointed chairman of the Ontario Law Reform Commission.

== Later life ==
From 1989 to 1993, he was chairman of the Commercial Registration Appeal Tribunal.

He was the chairman of the Corps of Commissionaires(Great Lakes Division), which employs some 1,200 former Service personnel. He was also the vice-chairman of the Last Post Fund (Ontario Branch) which attends to the funerals and burial of veterans without financial resources. He was the chairman of the German Pioneer's Day Committee locally in Kitchener-Waterloo for four years, and was a Deputy Judge in the Small Claims Courts of Kitchener, Cambridge, Woodstock, Stratford and Hamilton since 1993.

Breithaupt is a life member of the Waterloo Historical Society and was its President from 1996 to 1998. He was the Chairman of the Peace Monument 1871 Committee in Kitchener, and Chairman of the World Horseshoe Tournament in 1997. He organized and wrote the Memorial Plaques at the Waterloo Cenotaph in 1994 and 1995 and gathered the photos of those killed for the memorial displays, and he wrote the text for the plaque at the Kitchener Cenotaph.

Actively involved for the past 40 years with St. John's Ambulance, he was Chairman of the Kitchener-Waterloo Branch (1967–1971) and went on to become President of the Ontario Council of the Order of St. John (1989–1991). He was a Knight of Justice for the Order of St. John and has his own grant of personal arms.

The Government of Poland has made him a Knight of Merit. He was a member of Branch 412 (Polish) and 165 (Fort York) of the Royal Canadian Legion, the Toronto Artillery Officers Association, and the Royal Canadian Military Institute.

Breithaupt died at Grand River Hospital's Freeport Site on August 29, 2018, at the age of 83.
