= Berry Vrbanovic =

Croatian-Canadian politician

His Worship Berry Vrbanovic
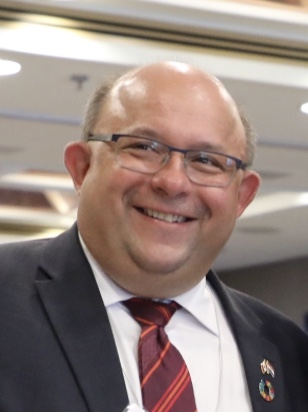
- Vrbanovic in 2017

Mayor of Kitchener
- Incumbent
- Assumed office December 1, 2014
- Preceded by: Carl Zehr

Personal details
- Born: August 19, 1966 (age 60) Zagreb, SR Croatia
- Party: Independent (since 1994)
- Other political affiliations: Liberal (1999)
- Education: Wilfrid Laurier University (BA)

Berry Vrbanovic (born August 19, 1966) is a Croatian-Canadian politician who has served as mayor of Kitchener since the 2014 municipal election.

Vrbanovic attended St. Jerome's High School, and graduated from Wilfrid Laurier University with a Bachelor of Arts degree in political science and a diploma in Business Administration. Prior to entering municipal politics, he worked in Kitchener's clerk's office and the information technology division.

Prior to his election to the mayoralty in 2014, he represented Ward 2 as a city councillor on Kitchener City Council from 1994 to 2014. He ran as an Ontario Liberal Party candidate in Kitchener Centre in the 1999 provincial election, losing to Wayne Wettlaufer.
