= Aislinn Clancy =

Canadian politician (born 1979)

Aislinn Clancy MPP
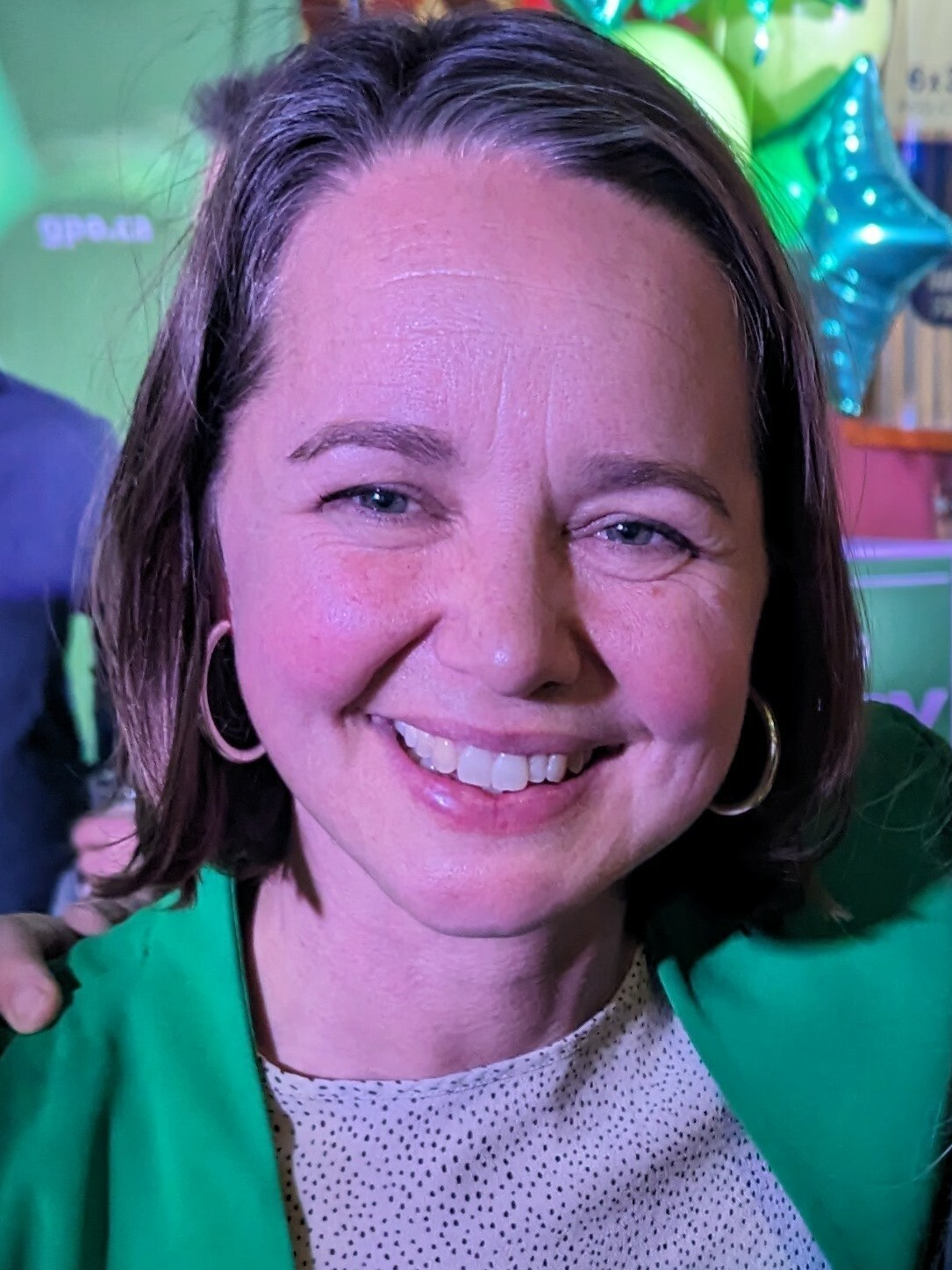

Deputy Leader of the Green Party of Ontario
- Incumbent
- Assumed office October 30, 2023
- Leader: Mike Schreiner
- Preceded by: Abhijeet Manay

Member of Provincial Parliament for Kitchener Centre
- Incumbent
- Assumed office November 30, 2023
- Preceded by: Laura Mae Lindo

Kitchener City Councillor
- In office November 15, 2022 – December 9, 2023
- Preceded by: Sarah Marsh
- Constituency: Ward 10

Personal details
- Born: April 30, 1979 (age 47) Cambridge, Ontario
- Party: Green
- Education: Wilfrid Laurier University
- Website: aislinnclancympp.ca

Aislinn Patricia Clancy MPP (/ˈæʃlɪn/ ASH-lynn; born April 30, 1979) is a Canadian politician and member of the Green Party of Ontario who was elected to serve as Member of Provincial Parliament for Kitchener Centre following a 2023 by-election. Clancy is the second member of the Ontario Greens to be elected in the province, following party leader Mike Schreiner. Prior to her election she was named Deputy Leader of the Green Party of Ontario by Mike Schreiner.

Prior to her election to the Legislative Assembly of Ontario, Clancy was elected to Kitchener City Council for Ward 10, serving just under a year in that role. Clancy is a social worker by profession.

== Electoral record ==
2025 Ontario general election: Kitchener Centre
Party	Candidate	Votes	%	±%	Expenditures
Green	Aislinn Clancy	21,200	51.39	+3.40	$76,737
Progressive Conservative	Rob Elliott	9,991	24.22	+11.06	$5,780
Liberal	Colleen James	5,892	14.28	+6.57	$50,379
New Democratic	Brooklin Wallis	2,821	6.84	–19.89	$15,702
New Blue	Paul Simoes	804	1.95	–0.30	$0
Ontario Party	Sebastian Butnar-Stoica	398	0.96	N/A	$0
Independent	Christopher Nuhn	144	0.35	N/A	
Total valid votes/expense limit		41,250	99.31	-0.03	$142,355
Total rejected, unmarked, and declined ballots		276	0.69	+0.03	
Turnout		41,536	47.29	+20.01	
Eligible voters		87,834			
Green hold		Swing		–3.8	
Source: Elections Ontario

Ontario provincial by-election, November 30, 2023: Kitchener Centre Resignation of Laura Mae Lindo
Party	Candidate	Votes	%	±%
Green	Aislinn Clancy	11,334	47.99	+35.19
New Democratic	Debbie Chapman	6,312	26.73	-13.86
Progressive Conservative	Rob Elliott	3,109	13.16	-13.51
Liberal	Kelly Steiss	1,821	7.71	-7.01
New Blue	Paul Simoes	532	2.25	-2.97
Libertarian	Gene Balfour	178	0.75	
None of the Above	Mark Dickson	61	0.26	
Special Needs	Lionel Wayne Poizner	48	0.20	
Electoral Reform	Peter House	43	0.18	
Independent	Albert Michel Benlolo	34	0.14	
Public Benefit	Jonathan Davis	33	0.14	
Independent	Patrick Strzalkowski	23	0.10	
Populist	Mario Greco	22	0.09	
Independent	Paul Stewart	18	0.08	
Independent	Ali Engering	16	0.07	
Independent	John Turmel	13	0.06	
Independent	Spencer Rocchi	11	0.05	
People's Front	Raymond Samuels	8	0.03	
Total valid votes		23,616	99.34	
Total rejected, unmarked and declined ballots		156	0.66	-0.01
Turnout		23,772	27.05	-19.16
Eligible voters		87,883		
Green gain from New Democratic		Swing		+24.53
Source: Elections Ontario

=== Kitchener City Council Elections (2022) ===
Candidate	Vote	%
Ward 10
Aislinn Clancy	1,765	36.15
Stephanie Stretch	1,650	33.80
Peter Davis	513	10.51
Phong Tran	398	8.15
Daniel J. Fife	346	7.09
Lana Hiscock	210	4.30
