= David R. Cooke =

Canadian politician (1937–2026)

David Cooke

Ontario MPP
- In office 1985–1990
- Preceded by: Jim Breithaupt
- Succeeded by: Will Ferguson
- Constituency: Kitchener

Personal details
- Born: August 4, 1937 Oshawa, Ontario, Canada
- Died: July 20, 2026 (aged 88)
- Party: Liberal
- Occupation: Lawyer

David Richard Cooke (August 4, 1937 – July 20, 2026) was a Canadian politician in the province of Ontario. He was a Liberal member of the Legislative Assembly of Ontario from 1985 to 1990. (Note: He is not to be confused with another Dave Cooke, who served as a New Democratic Party Member of Provincial Parliament (MPP) in Ontario during the same period.)

== Background ==
Cooke was educated at Queen's University, receiving a Bachelor of Arts degree, and a law degree. He worked as a lawyer before entering political life.

Cooke died on July 20, 2026, at the age of 88.

== Politics ==
Cooke ran for the House of Commons of Canada in the 1979 federal election as a candidate of the Liberal Party of Canada, but lost to Progressive Conservative John Reimer by about 7,000 votes in the riding of Kitchener.

He was elected to the Ontario legislature in the 1985 provincial election, defeating Progressive Conservative Don Travers by about 4,500 votes in the provincial constituency of Kitchener. He was re-elected by a greater margin of over 8000 votes in the 1987 provincial election. During his time in the legislature, Cooke served as a backbench supporter of David Peterson's government. He served as parliamentary assistant to the Minister of Citizenship in 1989.

Cooke was appointed Chair of the Select Committee on Free trade when the Peterson government came into being in the Summer of 1985. As such he became the principal source of facts for the concern which the government expressed during all the negotiations. Cooke and the committee would cite problems; the US negotiators kept an ongoing vigil as to those concerns, and the Canadian federal negotiators would eventually respond.

When the FTA was finally signed, Cooke became the first chair of the first Standing Committee on Economic Affairs in Ontario. As such he pioneered the pre-budget hearings which continue to this day.

The Liberals were defeated by the New Democratic Party in the 1990 provincial election, and Cooke lost his seat to NDP candidate Will Ferguson by 6,019 votes.

He was later appointed an immigrant judge in the Immigration and Refugee Board of Canada by an Order in Council approved by Cabinet and announced by Prime Minister Jean Chrétien.

In 1997, Cooke began a 10-year term on the Immigration and Refugee Board, during which time he wrote a number of lead decisions. One such decision clarified the status of Tibetan refugees from China while they sojourned in India and Nepal.
