= Wayne Wettlaufer =

Canadian politician

Ontario MPP
- In office 1999–2003
- Preceded by: New riding
- Succeeded by: John Milloy
- Constituency: Kitchener Centre
- In office 1995–1999
- Preceded by: Will Ferguson
- Succeeded by: Riding abolished
- Constituency: Kitchener

Personal details
- Born: 16 December 1943 Kitchener, Ontario
- Died: 21 June 2015 (aged 71) Waterloo, Ontario
- Party: Progressive Conservative
- Children: 1
- Occupation: Insurance manager

Wayne Kenneth Wettlaufer (16 December 1943 – 21 June 2015) was a politician in Ontario, Canada. He was a Progressive Conservative member of the Legislative Assembly of Ontario from 1995 to 2003. In 2014 he was elected as a regional councillor for Kitchener and he served in that position until his death in 2015.

== Background ==
Wettlaufer obtained a Bachelor of Arts degree from the University of Guelph. He worked as an insurance manager for K.W. Insurance in 1963, and as an insurance inspector for Waterloo Mutual and Gore Mutual, Ottawa in 1972. He was promoted to corporate marketing manager with Gore Mutual, Cambridge in 1980, and became a partner in the firm of Wettlaufer, Collins, Rankin Insurance Brokers in 1984. He remained a member of this firm until winning political office in 1995.

== Politics ==
Wettlaufer was elected to the Ontario legislature for the riding of Kitchener in the provincial election of 1995, defeating Liberal candidate Bryan Stortz by over 3,000 votes. The Progressive Conservatives won a majority government in this election and Wettlaufer served as a backbench supporter of the Mike Harris government.

In 1996, the Harris government reduced the number of ridings from 130 to 103. This change meant that sitting MPPs had to compete against one another for re-nomination in some ridings. Wettlaufer ran for the Kitchener Centre PC nomination in 1999 defeating fellow PC member Gary Leadston. Wettlaufer was re-elected in the provincial election of 1999, defeating Liberal Berry Vrbanovic by over 4,000 votes in the redistributed riding of Kitchener Centre. He was appointed to the position of deputy whip after the election, and continued in his role as a backbencher throughout his time in the legislature.

As a backbencher, he passed a Private Member's Bill designating the day after Thanksgiving in each year as German Pioneers Day in Ontario. In the provincial election of 2003, Wettlaufer lost to Liberal candidate John Milloy by just over 2,000 votes.

Wettlaufer endorsed Frank Klees for the leadership of the Ontario PC Party in 2004 and 2009. In 2005, he vied for the PC nomination in the Federal riding of Kitchener-Conestoga. He lost to Harold Albrecht who went on to win the contest in the Canadian election of 2006.

In 2012, as president of the Ontario chapter of the German-Canadian Congress, Wettlaufer defended accused war criminal Helmut Oberlander who was stripped of his Canadian citizenship. Wettlaufer said, "The court case did not prove beyond a doubt that he was a war criminal." On 3 July 2013, Wettlaufer stirred controversy with a tweet, later deleted, that claimed female electors vote for the Liberal Party because they "get all their information from the Toronto Star" and are "less informed".

He was a candidate in the provincial election of 2014 in his old riding of Kitchener Centre. During the election campaign Wettlaufer contradicted his party platform during an all candidate debate when he said that public sector jobs would be cut entirely through attrition. He was defeated by Liberal candidate Daiene Vernile by 6,922 votes.

He was elected as a regional councillor for Kitchener in the 2014 election but served less than a year before his death on 21 June 2015.

== Electoral record ==
Waterloo Region - Regional Councillor for the City of Kitchener, 2014 (Note: Four positions available.)
Candidate	Votes
Karen Redman	28,616
Tom Galloway	24,866
Wayne Wettlaufer	17,471
Geoff Lorentz	17,005
Elizabeth Clarke	16,586
Cameron J. Dearlove	14,439
Greg Burns	8,331

2014 Ontario general election
Party	Candidate	Votes	%	±%
Liberal	Daiene Vernile	18,472	43.14	+3.91
Progressive Conservative	Wayne Wettlaufer	11,550	26.98	-11.42
New Democratic	Margaret Johnston	9,765	22.81	+3.99
Green	Ronnie Smith	2,472	5.77	+3.38
Libertarian	Patrick Bernier	557	1.30	+0.69

2003 Ontario general election
Party	Candidate	Votes	%	±%
Liberal	John Milloy	18,280	42.60	+2.68
Progressive Conservative	Wayne Wettlaufer	16,120	37.57	-12.58
New Democratic	Ted Martin	6,781	15.80	+8.04
Green	Luigi D'agnillo	1,728	4.03	+2.78

1999 Ontario general election
Party	Candidate	Votes	%	±%
Progressive Conservative	Wayne Wettlaufer	22,593		
Liberal	Berry Vrbanovic	17,984		
New Democratic	David Brohman	3,494		
Green	Susan Koswan	561		
Natural Life	Roy Anderson	204		
Ind	Irvine Conner	109		
Marxist–Leninist	Julian Ichim	107		

1995 Ontario general election
Party	Candidate	Votes	%	±%
Progressive Conservative	Wayne Wettlaufer	13,374		
Liberal	Bryan Stortz	9,992		
New Democratic	Sandi Ellis	6,998		
Family Coalition	Lou Reitzel	2,111		
Ind	Bob Oberholtzer	612		
Ind	Frank Kerek	223		
