= Laura Mae Lindo =

Canadian politician

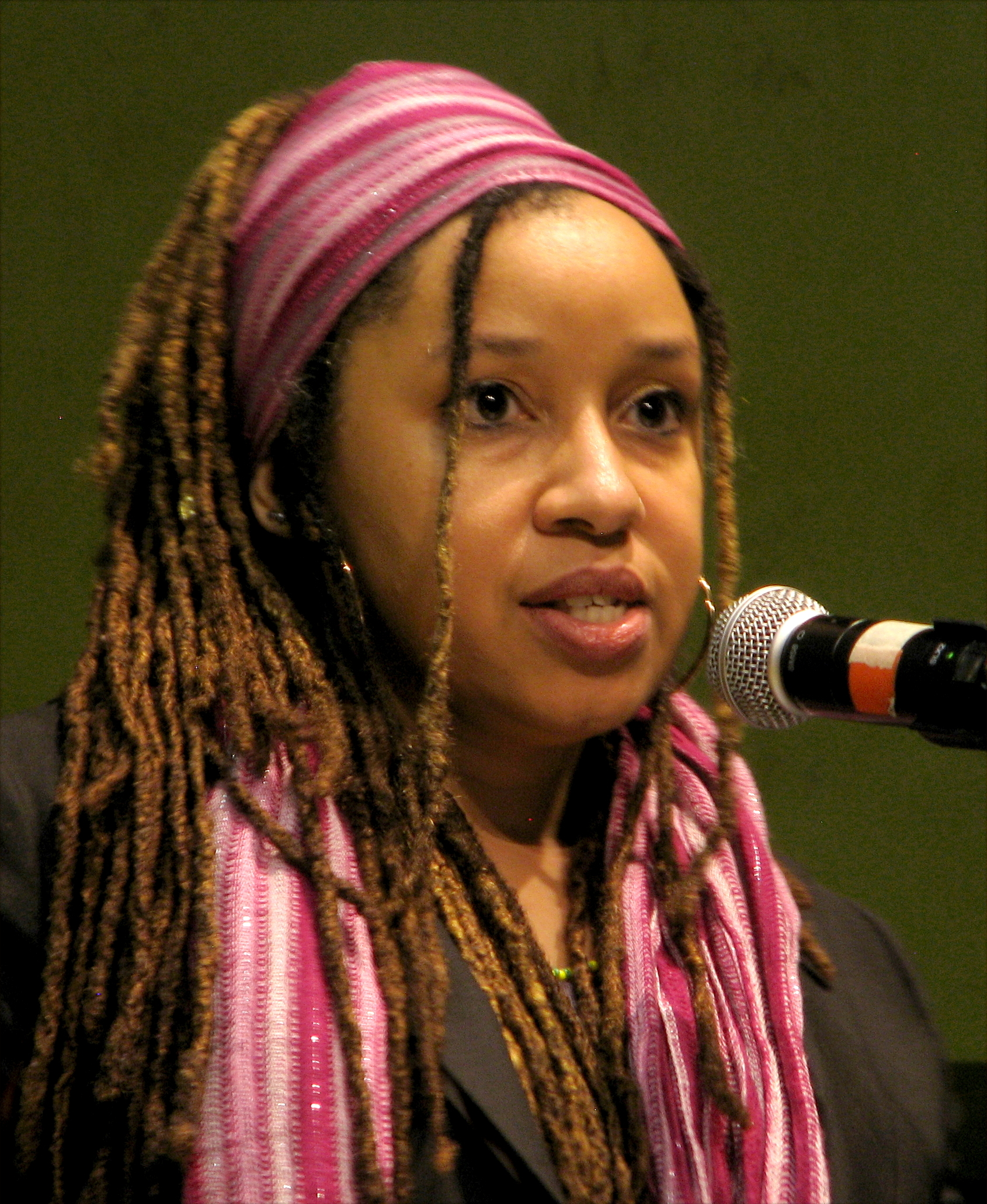
- Lindo at an event during the 2018 Ontario provincial election

Critic, Citizenship and Immigration Services
- In office August 23, 2018 – July 13, 2023
- Leader: Andrea Horwath (2018-2022); Peter Tabuns (interim) (2022-2023); Marit Stiles (2023-)

Member of the Ontario Provincial Parliament for Kitchener Centre
- In office June 7, 2018 – July 13, 2023
- Preceded by: Daiene Vernile
- Succeeded by: Aislinn Clancy

Personal details
- Born: Laura Mae Monique Lindo; 1976 (age 49–50) Scarborough, Ontario, Canada
- Party: New Democratic
- Children: 3
- Relatives: Alvin Curling (uncle)
- Education: University of Toronto; York University
- Occupation: Non-profit director; post-secondary administrator
- Website: lauramaelindompp.ca

Laura Mae Monique Lindo (born 1976) is a Canadian politician who was elected to the Legislative Assembly of Ontario in the 2018 provincial election. She represented the electoral district of Kitchener Centre as a member of the Ontario New Democratic Party. In January 2023, Lindo announced that she would step down as MPP in July to take a position with the philosophy department of the University of Waterloo. She officially resigned on July 13, 2023.

== Early life and education ==
Born in Canada, Lindo's parents immigrated to the country from Jamaica. Her mother Osra Lindo graduated from York University with a bachelor's degree in gender and women's studies at the age of 79. She is the niece of former Ontario MPP and Speaker Alvin Curling. Raised in Scarborough, Lindo has lived in Kitchener since 2014.

Lindo graduated from the Scarborough campus of the University of Toronto with a Bachelor of Arts (BA) degree in philosophy in 1998 followed by a second BA degree in African studies and philosophy from York University. Her Master of Education degree, completed at York, examined Ontario's high school philosophy program. Lindo also holds a Doctor of Philosophy degree in education. She completed her studies at York University in 2011 with a thesis titled "I'm Writing for Freedom!" Mapping Public Discourse on Race in Comedy.

== Career ==
Lindo is Kitchener's first Black MPP. She served as a Member of the Standing Committee on Regulations and Private Bills, and as Critic for Citizenship and Immigration Services and Critic for anti-racism. In 2018, Lindo was named a member of the Ontario NDP's first ever Black Caucus, alongside NDP caucus colleagues Rima Berns-McGown, Faisal Hassan, Jill Andrew and Kevin Yarde. Prior to her election, she worked as Director of Diversity and Equity at Wilfrid Laurier University. In December 2021, she introduced Bill 67, The Racial Equity in Education Systems Act which "embeds anti-racist language into pieces of legislation from kindergarten to grade 12, and all throughout post secondary", saying "when you define it, then it is real".

After the resignation of Ontario NDP leader Andrea Horwath in June 2022 after the party's defeat in the Ontario general election, Lindo was seen as a potential candidate in the subsequent leadership election, but she decided not to run in November.

In January 2023, Lindo announced that she would be stepping down that July to join the University of Waterloo's philosophy department. She cited child care costs as a cause for her resigning her seat. Lindo endorsed Debbie Chapman as the next NDP candidate in the by-election. However, the seat flipped to the Green Party candidate Aislinn Clancy.

In 2026, Lindo endorsed Avi Lewis in that year's federal NDP leadership race.

== Select publications ==
- Carr, Paul R.; Lund, Darren E., eds. (2007). "Whiteness and Philosophy: Imagining Non-White Philosophy in Schools". The Great White North? Exploring Whiteness, Privilege, and Identity in Education. Rotterdam, Netherlands: Sense Publishers. ISBN 9789087901448.
- Laura Mae Lindo (2012). "A Comic Routine: The Place of Slavery in Identify Formation for the Twenty-First Century". In Allen, Marlene D.; Williams, Seretha D. (eds.). Afterimages of Slavery: Essays on Appearances in Recent American Films, Literature, Television and Other Media. Jefferson, North Carolina: McFarland. ISBN 978-0786490165.
- Lindo, Laura Mae (November 2015). "A Man and His Mic: Taking Chris Rock and Dave Chappelle to Teacher's College". European Journal of Humour Research. 3 (4): 54–74. doi:10.7592/EJHR2015.3.4.lindo.

== Election results ==
2022 Ontario general election: Kitchener Centre
Party	Candidate	Votes	%	±%	Expenditures
New Democratic	Laura Mae Lindo	15,789	40.59	−2.80	$69,851
Progressive Conservative	Jim Schmidt	10,376	26.67	−0.99	$73,765
Liberal	Kelly Steiss	5,728	14.72	−5.37	$53,771
Green	Wayne Mak	4,980	12.80	+5.96	$16,108
New Blue	Peter Beimers	2,029	5.22		$3,767
Total valid votes/expense limit		38,902	99.33	+0.91	$118,646
Total rejected, unmarked, and declined ballots		262	0.67	-0.91	
Turnout		39,164	46.21	-12.06	
Eligible voters		84,304			
New Democratic hold		Swing		−0.90	
Source(s): "Summary of Valid Votes Cast for Each Candidate" (PDF). Elections Ontario. 2022. Archived from the original on 2023-05-18.; "Statistical Summary by Electoral District" (PDF). Elections Ontario. 2022. Archived from the original on 2023-05-21.

2018 Ontario general election: Kitchener Centre
Party	Candidate	Votes	%	±%
New Democratic	Laura Mae Lindo	20,512	43.38	+20.57
Progressive Conservative	Mary Henein Thorn	13,080	27.66	+0.68
Liberal	Daiene Vernile	9,499	20.09	-23.05
Green	Stacey Danckert	3,234	6.84	+1.07
Libertarian	Jason Erb	439	0.93	-0.37
None of the Above	Chris Carr	429	0.91	
Communist	Marty Suter	87	0.18	
Total valid votes		47,280	98.42	
Total rejected, unmarked and declined ballots		757	1.58	
Turnout		48,037	58.27	
Eligible voters		80,514		
New Democratic gain		Swing		
Source: Elections Ontario
