= John Milloy =

Canadian politician (born 1965)

The Honourable John Milloy ECO
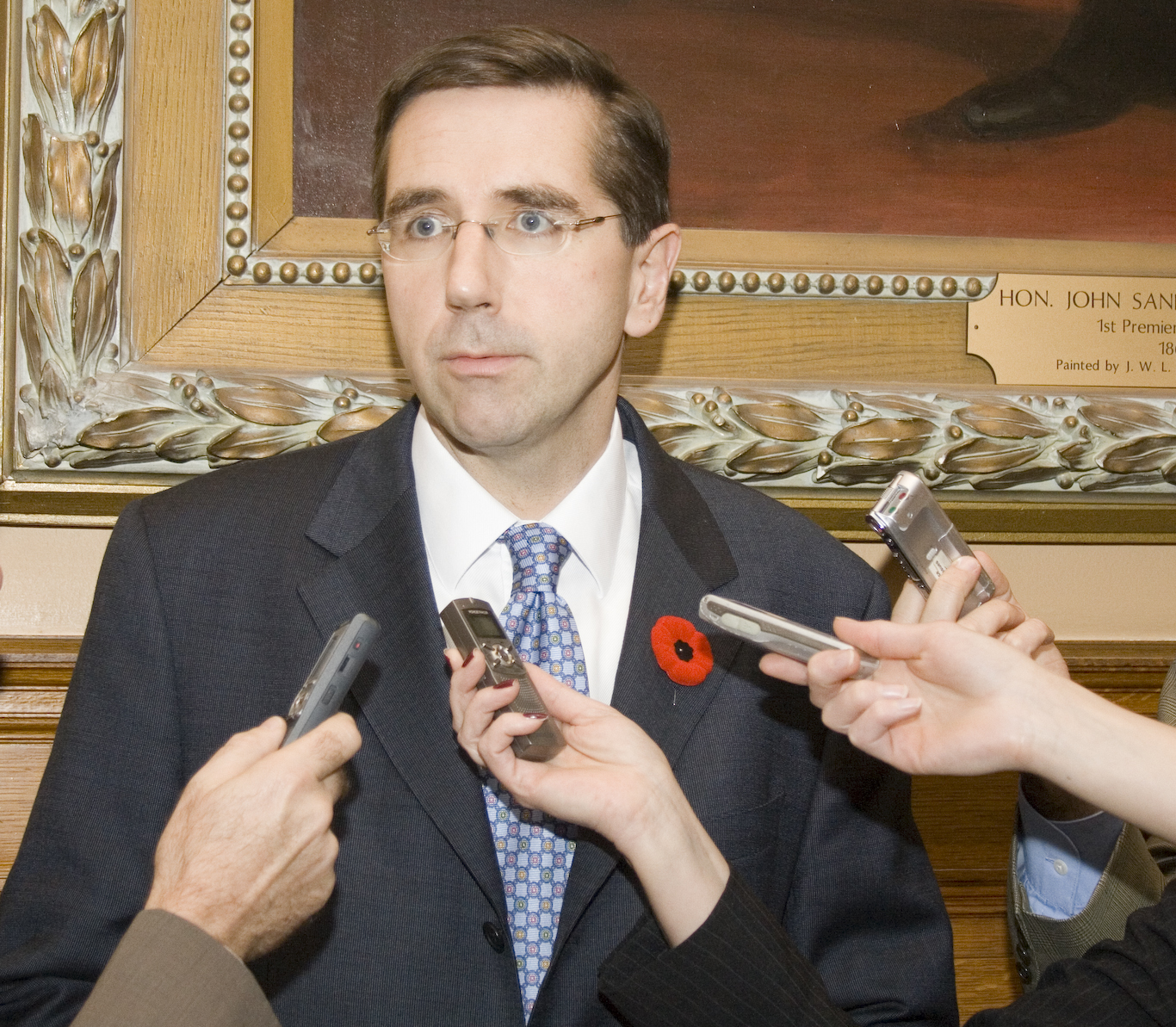

Member of the Ontario Provincial Parliament for Kitchener Centre
- In office October 2, 2003 – June 12, 2014
- Preceded by: Wayne Wettlaufer
- Succeeded by: Daiene Vernile

Personal details
- Born: 29 June 1965 (age 60) Kitchener, Ontario, Canada
- Party: Liberal
- Spouse: Sara Pendergast
- Children: Michael Francis Gerard Milloy, John Patrick Milloy
- Occupation: Civil servant

John Christopher Milloy (born June 29, 1965) is a former politician in Ontario, Canada. He was a Liberal member of the Legislative Assembly of Ontario from 2003 to 2014 who represented the riding of the Kitchener Centre. He served as a cabinet minister in the government of Dalton McGuinty and Kathleen Wynne.

== Background ==
Milloy obtained a Bachelor of Arts degree from Carleton University, a Master of Arts degree in International History from the London School of Economics, and a Doctorate in Modern History from Oxford University. He worked at the Centre for International Governance Innovation in Waterloo, Ontario. He was a legislative assistant to Prime Minister of Canada Jean Chrétien from 1997 to 2002, and also worked as an assistant to Stéphane Dion, John Manley and Yvonne O'Neill. He is married to Sara Pendergast, an emergency room physician.

Milloy has written a book titled The North Atlantic Treaty Organization, 1948-1957: Community or Alliance? published by McGill-Queen's University Press on June 1, 2006.

== Politics ==
In the 2003 provincial election he ran as the Liberal candidate in the riding of Kitchener Centre. He defeated incumbent Progressive Conservative Wayne Wettlaufer by 2,160 votes. On October 23, 2003, Milloy was named parliamentary assistant to Premier Dalton McGuinty in the latter's secondary capacity as the Minister of Intergovernmental Affairs, and continued under new minister Marie Bountrogianni. He served in this position until November 2006, when he was appointed parliamentary assistant to Minister of Training, Colleges and Universities Chris Bentley.

He was re-elected in the 2007 provincial election and he was appointed to Cabinet as Minister of Training, Colleges and Universities. In a cabinet shuffle on June 24, 2009, he was given additional responsibilities as Minister of Research and Innovation. After the 2011 election, he was moved to the position of Minister of Community and Social Services and named Government House Leader.

In Kathleen Wynne's government, Milloy served as Government House Leader and was appointed the Minister of Government Services in February 2013.

In early 2014, Milloy announced that he would retire from politics. He did not run in the 2014 provincial election.

=== Cabinet posts ===
Wynne ministry, Province of Ontario (2013–2018)
Cabinet post (1)
Predecessor	Office	Successor
Dwight Duncan	Minister of Government Services; 2013-2014	David Orazietti
McGuinty ministry, Province of Ontario (2003–2013)
Cabinet posts (4)
Predecessor	Office	Successor
Monique Smith	Government House Leader; 2011–2014	Yasir Naqvi
Madeleine Meilleur	Minister of Community and Social Services; 2011–2013	Ted McMeekin
John Wilkinson	Minister of Research and Innovation; 2009–2010	Glen Murray
Chris Bentley	Minister of Training, Colleges and Universities; 2007–2011, 2012–2013	Glen Murray

== After politics ==
In March 2015, Milloy joined Wilfrid Laurier University as an assistant professor to teach politics and public ethics.

== Electoral record ==
2003 Ontario general election
Party	Candidate	Votes	%	±%
Liberal	John Milloy	18,280	42.60	+2.68
Progressive Conservative	Wayne Wettlaufer	16,120	37.57	-12.58
New Democratic	Ted Martin	6,781	15.80	+8.04
Green	Luigi D'agnillo	1,728	4.03	+2.78

2007 Ontario general election
Party	Candidate	Votes	%	±%
Liberal	John Milloy	17,458	45.9	+3.3
Progressive Conservative	Matt Stanson	9,713	25.5	-12.07
New Democratic	Rich Moffit	6,694	17.6	+1.8
Green	Daniel Logan	3,160	8.3	+4.72
Family Coalition	William J. Berhardt	600	1.6	
Independent	John D. McGuire	425	1.1	

2011 Ontario general election
Party	Candidate	Votes	%	±%
Liberal	John Milloy	15,392	39.23	-6.65
Progressive Conservative	Dave Macdonald	15,069	38.40	+12.87
New Democratic	Cameron Dearlove	7,385	18.82	+1.23
Green	Mark Vercouteren	938	2.39	-5.91
Libertarian	Patrick Bernier	240	0.61	
Independent	Mark Corbiere	137	0.35	
Freedom	Bugra Atsiz	77	0.20	
Total valid votes		39,238	100.0	
Total rejected, unmarked and declined ballots		172	0.44	
Turnout		39,410	49.16	
Eligible voters		80,170		
Liberal hold		Swing		-9.76
Source: Elections Ontario
