= 1982 Ontario Liberal Party leadership election =

Canadian provincial party election

- Date: February 22, 1982
- Convention: Sheraton Centre Toronto Hotel, Toronto, Ontario
- Resigning leader: Stuart Smith
- Won by: David Peterson
- Ballots: 2
- Candidates: 5

The Ontario Liberal Party leadership election, 1982, was held on February 22, 1982, to replace Stuart Smith who stepped down as leader after the 1981 provincial election. Smith resigned his seat a month before the convention to accept a federal appointment. David Peterson, who had lost against Smith in 1976, was the early front-runner and he won the election on the second ballot with 55% of the vote. Peterson went on to become Premier in 1985, leading the Liberals to power after 42 years of Conservative rule.

== Background ==
Stuart Smith had been leader since 1976. He led the party through two elections. Although he took the party from third place to second, becoming leader of the opposition in a minority legislature after the 1977 election, the Liberals failed to make gains in the 1981 election and the Tories were able regained their majority status. Smith announced his decision to resign on September 5, 1981. Speculation about possible successors included MPPs Jim Breithaupt, David Peterson and Patrick Reid. The race quickly heated up when five days later, John Sweeney a Kitchener MPP announced his intention to seek the party leadership. Fellow MPP Jim Breithaupt announced his candidacy a day later.

On September 19, the Liberal party announced that they would hold a convention on the weekend of February 19–21, 1982 to choose a new leader.

== Candidates ==
=== Jim Breithaupt ===
Breithaupt, 47, MPP for Kitchener since 1967 and former Liberal House Leader, was a lawyer and the party's justice critic. He was portrayed by the media as a rational politician who favoured reason over passion. He said, "I've not seen that as a fault... it is just the way I am. I think I can do the job when it has to be done." He said that he would focus on a reorganization of the party's riding associations and a campaign to pay off the party's election debt. He was initially seen as one of the front-runners, but was kept off the campaign trail by a car accident. His wife, Jane, and Wentworth North MPP Eric Cunningham represented him at campaign meetings and rallies.

- Supporters in Caucus (3): Eric Cunningham (Wentworth North), Patrick Reid (Rainy River) and Harry Worton (Wellington South)

=== Sheila Copps ===
Copps, 29, a rookie MPP for Hamilton Centre since 1981 and daughter of former Hamilton Mayor Victor Copps, was riding assistant to outgoing leader Smith for four years before being elected herself. She ran a left-of-centre reformist campaign for leader. Her campaign received surprising amount of media attention, positioning her as the leading challenging to the front runner Peterson.

- Copps had no declared supporters in caucus, but was endorsed by federal cabinet ministers Judy Erola, John Munro, James Fleming, Bob Kaplan and Charles Caccia, Jean-Jacques Blais, Eugene Whelan

=== David Peterson ===
Peterson, 38, MPP for London Centre since 1975, was the runner up in the 1976 leadership contest, coming within 45 votes of defeating Stuart Smith. Peterson was generally acknowledged as the front-runner throughout the campaign, having spent the years since the last leadership race "organizing, getting his people in place, getting commitments of support from caucus members, raising money and biding his time." His campaign focus on economics issues and pitched himself as a Liberal a Conservative would vote for.

- Supporters in Caucus (18): Jim Bradley (St. Catharines), Sean Conway (Renfrew North), John Eakins (Victoria-Haliburton), Murray Elston (Huron-Bruce), Herbert Epp (Waterloo North), Remo Mancini (Essex South), J. Earl McEwen (Frontenac-Addington), Bob McKessock (Grey), Gordon Miller (Haldimand-Norfolk), Robert Nixon (Brant-Oxford-Norfolk), Hugh O'Neil (Quinte), Julian Reed (Halton-Burlington), Jack Riddell (Huron-Middlesex), Richard Ruston (Essex North), Edward Sargent (Grey-Bruce), Michael Spensieri (Yorkview), Ronald Van Horne (London North) and Bill Wrye (Windsor-Sandwich)

=== John Sweeney ===
Sweeney, 50, MPP for Kitchener—Wilmot since 1975, was a former teacher who served as the party's education critic. Sweeney held strong views on abortion and had sponsored a private member's bill in 1978 to reduce the number of abortions performed in the province. He was also a member of the Council of Mind Abuse, a group formed to fight mind-indoctrination techniques by cults. Fellow member Sean Conway said that Sweeney would appeal to the "Catholic conservative constituency within the Liberal party." Sweeney disagreed saying that he was actually a middle of the road politician. He said, "Because I have some firm moral positions doesn't mean I am to the right." He said that if elected leader he would seek to tighten the restrictions on abortion performed in the province.

=== Richard Thomas ===
Thomas, 49, was a former Perry Township councillor and environmental activist who was a voice-over artist professionally, known for his work in commercials and narrating documentaries. As a Liberal candidate in the 1981 provincial election he came within six votes of defeating future Premier Ernie Eves in Parry Sound. He would later run several times for the Green Party of Ontario from 1990 to 2001 and was elected head of Armour Township council in 2003.

== Convention ==
There were approximately 2,000 delegates at the convention, including MPPs and party officials, delegates chosen by the party's youth wing and delegates elected to represent each of the 125 riding associations. This was the last Ontario Liberal Party leadership contest where riding association delegates were elected without being declared for a specific leadership candidate, though in some cases potential delegates declared their support in advance.

Having acknowledged that his speech at the 1976 convention was "the worst speech in modern political history", Peterson's convention speech was carefully rehearsed. He wanted the party to move towards centre and stressed Liberal values on social programs. While not very inspiring, it was seen as 'statesmanlike' and effective.

The 29-year-old Copps, who had first been elected to the legislature the previous year, had not been expected to be a serious contender but made an impressive showing. Peterson came first on the first ballot ahead of Sheila Copps, who came a strong second, while Thomas surprised the convention by coming in third. After the first ballot Sweeney was eliminated and Briethaupt withdrew, both declined to endorsing anybody for the next ballot.

Peterson won on the second ballot with 55% over Copps with Thomas placing third. In his acceptance speech Peterson said that he would move party to the 'vibrant middle, the radical centre', and stressed economic growth as a way to increase support for social services. Observers from the other parties felt he was trying to move the Liberal party more to the right away from priorities that Stuart Smith promoted.

== Aftermath ==
By the end of 1982 the party had paid off election debt and was working on long-term debt. Peterson performed well as opposition leader and was popular in the press. The party started to use him as a label rather than Liberal referring to 'Davd Peterson's Ontario'. A by-election loss to the NDP was attributed to dislike of federal Liberals. In three short years, Peterson led the party out of the political wilderness to become Premier of Ontario, the first Liberal leader to do so in 42 years.

== Ballot results ==
= Eliminated from next round
= Withdrew nomination
= Winner

Delegate support by ballot
Candidate	1st Ballot		2nd Ballot	
Name	Votes	%	Votes	%
David Peterson	966	46.3	1136	55.2
Sheila Copps	636	30.5	774	37.6
Richard Thomas	234	11.2	148	7.2
Jim Breithaupt	130	6.2		
John Sweeney	122	5.8		
Votes cast by ballot
Total	2088	100.0	2058	100.0
