= Daiene Vernile =

Canadian politician

The Honourable Daiene Vernile ECO
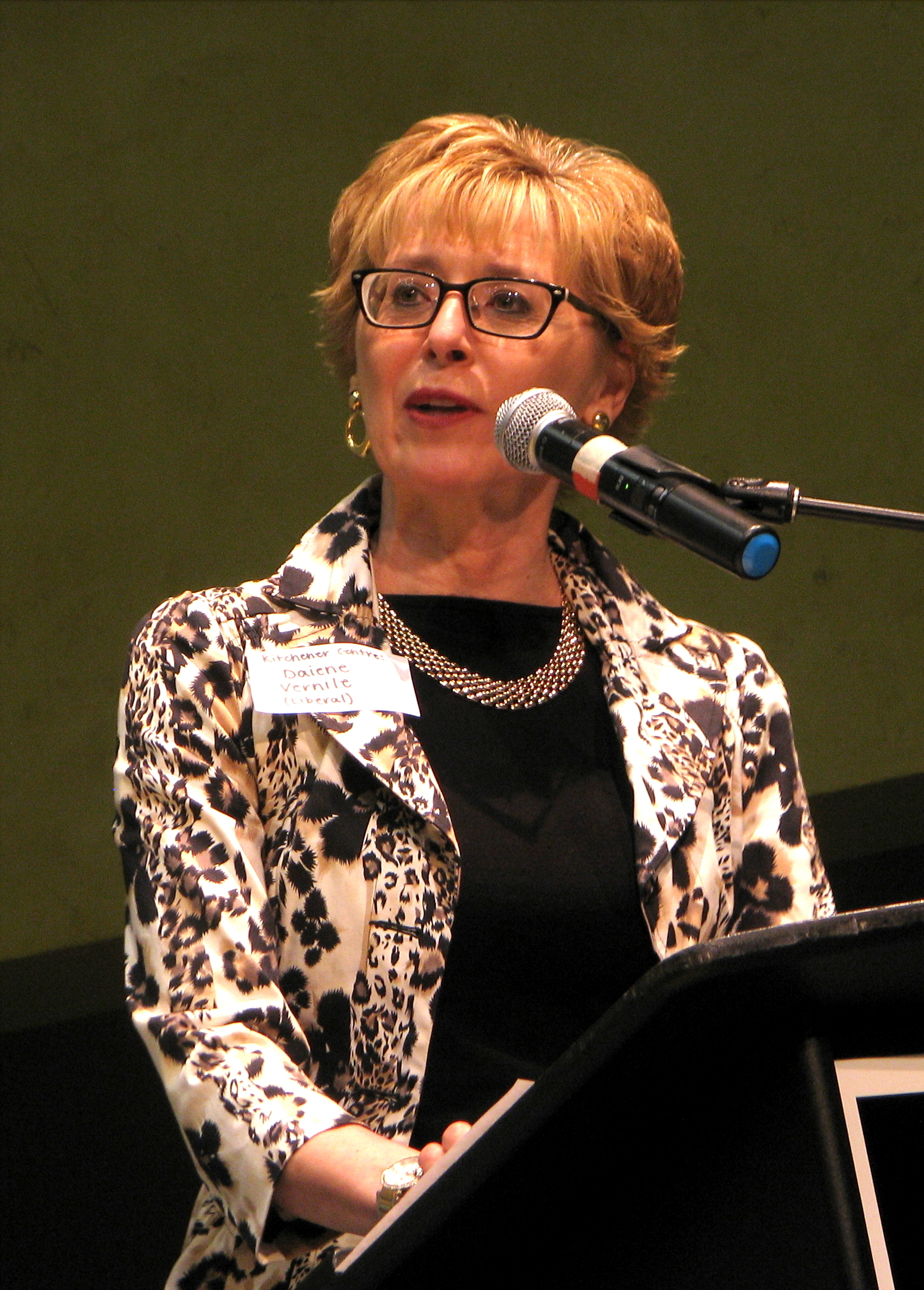
- Vernile speaking at the All Candidates Event, 2018

Member of the Ontario Provincial Parliament for Kitchener Centre
- In office June 12, 2014 – June 7, 2018
- Preceded by: John Milloy
- Succeeded by: Laura Mae Lindo

Personal details
- Born: July 1, 1960 (age 65)
- Party: Ontario Liberal
- Spouse: John Matlock
- Children: 3
- Profession: Television journalist

Daiene G. Vernile ECO (born July 1, 1960) is a former Canadian politician in Ontario, Canada. She was a Liberal member of the Legislative Assembly of Ontario from 2014 to 2018 who represented the riding of Kitchener Centre. She was a member of cabinet in the government of Kathleen Wynne.

== Background ==
Prior to her election to the legislature, Vernile was a television journalist for CKCO-TV. She lives in Kitchener, Ontario with her husband John. They have three children.

== Politics ==
She ran in the 2014 provincial election as the Liberal candidate in the riding of Kitchener Centre. She defeated Progressive Conservative candidate and former MPP Wayne Wettlaufer by 6,913 votes.

In June 2014, she was appointed as Parliamentary Assistant to the Minister of Research and Innovation.

On January 17, 2018, Vernile was sworn into cabinet as Minister of Tourism, Culture and Sport.

She was defeated by NDP candidate Laura Mae Lindo in the 2018 provincial election.

=== Cabinet positions ===
Wynne ministry, Province of Ontario (2013–2018)
Cabinet post (1)
Predecessor	Office	Successor
Eleanor McMahon	Minister of Tourism, Culture and Sport; January 17, 2018—June 29, 2018	Sylvia Jones

== Electoral record ==
2018 Ontario general election
Party	Candidate	Votes	%	±%
New Democratic	Laura Mae Lindo	20,512	43.38	+20.57
Progressive Conservative	Mary Henein Thorn	13,080	27.66	+0.68
Liberal	Daiene Vernile	9,499	20.09	-23.05
Green	Stacey Danckert	3,234	6.84	+1.07
Libertarian	Jason Erb	439	0.93	-0.37
None of the Above	Chris Carr	429	0.91	
Communist	Marty Suter	87	0.18	
Total valid votes		47,280	100.0	
Source: Elections Ontario

2014 Ontario general election
Party	Candidate	Votes	%	±%
Liberal	Daiene Vernile	18,472	43.14	+3.91
Progressive Conservative	Wayne Wettlaufer	11,550	26.98	-11.42
New Democratic	Margaret Johnston	9,765	22.81	+3.99
Green	Ronnie Smith	2,472	5.77	+3.38
Libertarian	Patrick Bernier	557	1.30	+0.69
Total valid votes		42,816	100.0	
Liberal hold		Swing		+7.66
Source: Elections Ontario
