= Kitchener Centre (provincial electoral district) =

Provincial electoral district in Ontario, Canada

Coordinates: 43.4562°N 80.4794°W

Ontario electoral district
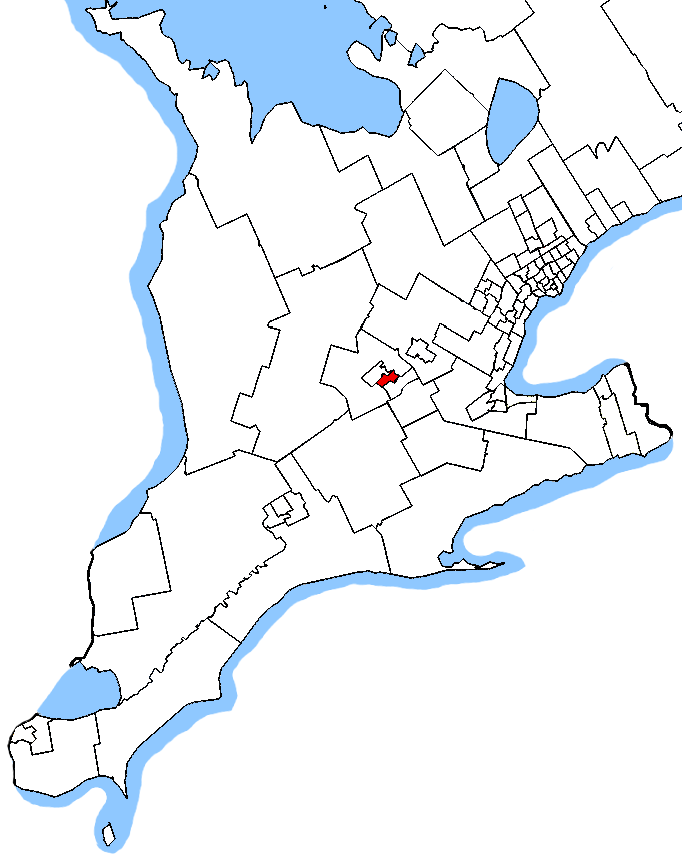
- Kitchener Centre in relation to Southern Ontario ridings

Provincial electoral district
- Legislature: Legislative Assembly of Ontario
MPP
Aislinn Clancy
Green
- First contested: 1999
- Last contested: 2025

Demographics
- Population (2016): 105,260
- Electors (2018): 82,445
- Area (km²): 42
- Pop. density (per km²): 2,506.2
- Census division: Waterloo
- Census subdivision: Kitchener

Kitchener Centre is a provincial electoral district in Ontario, Canada, that has been represented in the Legislative Assembly of Ontario since 1999.

== Geography ==
The district includes the north-central part of the city of Kitchener.

== History ==
The provincial electoral district was created in 1996 from parts of Kitchener and Kitchener—Wilmot when provincial ridings were defined to have the same borders as federal ridings.

== Members of Provincial Parliament ==
Kitchener Centre
Assembly	Years	Member	Party
Riding created from Kitchener and Kitchener—Wilmot
37th	1999–2003	Wayne Wettlaufer	Progressive Conservative
38th	2003–2007	John Milloy	Liberal
39th	2007–2011	John Milloy	Liberal
40th	2011–2014	John Milloy	Liberal
41st	2014–2018	Daiene Vernile	Liberal
42nd	2018–2022	Laura Mae Lindo	New Democratic
43rd	2022–2023	Laura Mae Lindo	New Democratic
43rd	2023–2025	Aislinn Clancy	Green
44th	2025–present	Aislinn Clancy	Green

== Election results ==
Winning party in each polling division of Kitchener Centre at the 2025 Ontario general election

2025 Ontario general election
Party	Candidate	Votes	%	±%	Expenditures
Green	Aislinn Clancy	21,200	51.39	+3.40	$76,737
Progressive Conservative	Rob Elliott	9,991	24.22	+11.06	$5,780
Liberal	Colleen James	5,892	14.28	+6.57	$50,379
New Democratic	Brooklin Wallis	2,821	6.84	–19.89	$15,702
New Blue	Paul Simoes	804	1.95	–0.30	$0
Ontario Party	Sebastian Butnar-Stoica	398	0.96	–	$0
Independent	Christopher Nuhn	144	0.35	–	$0
Total valid votes/expense limit		41,250	99.34	–	$142,355
Total rejected, unmarked and declined ballots		276	0.66	+0.01	
Turnout		41,526	46.97	+19.92	
Eligible voters		88,419			
Green hold		Swing		–3.83	
Source: Elections Ontario

Ontario provincial by-election, November 30, 2023 Resignation of Laura Mae Lindo
Party	Candidate	Votes	%	±%
Green	Aislinn Clancy	11,334	47.99	+35.19
New Democratic	Debbie Chapman	6,312	26.73	–13.86
Progressive Conservative	Rob Elliott	3,109	13.16	–13.51
Liberal	Kelly Steiss	1,821	7.71	–7.01
New Blue	Paul Simoes	532	2.25	–2.96
Libertarian	Gene Balfour	178	0.75	–
None of the Above	Mark Dickson	61	0.26	–
Special Needs	Lionel Wayne Poizner	48	0.20	–
Electoral Reform Party	Peter House	43	0.18	–
Independent	Albert Michel Benlolo	34	0.14	–
Public Benefit Party	Jonathan Davis	33	0.14	–
Independent	Patrick Strzalkowski	23	0.10	–
Populist	Mario Greco	22	0.09	–
Independent	Paul Stewart	18	0.08	–
Independent	Ali Engering	16	0.07	–
Independent	John Turmel	13	0.06	–
Independent	Spencer Rocchi	11	0.05	–
People's Front	Raymond Samuels	8	0.03	–
Total valid votes		23,616	99.34	
Total rejected, unmarked and declined ballots		156	0.66	–0.01
Turnout		23,772	27.05	–19.16
Eligible voters		87,883		
Green gain from New Democratic		Swing		+24.53
Source: Elections Ontario

Winning party in each polling division of Kitchener Centre at the 2022 Ontario general election

2022 Ontario general election
Party	Candidate	Votes	%	±%	Expenditures
New Democratic	Laura Mae Lindo	15,789	40.59	–2.80	$69,851
Progressive Conservative	Jim Schmidt	10,376	26.67	–0.99	$73,765
Liberal	Kelly Steiss	5,728	14.72	–5.37	$53,771
Green	Wayne Mak	4,980	12.80	+5.96	$16,108
New Blue	Peter Beimers	2,029	5.22	–	$3,767
Total valid votes/expense limit		38,902	99.33	–	$118,646
Total rejected, unmarked and declined ballots		262	0.67	–0.91	
Turnout		39,164	46.21	–12.05	
Eligible voters		84,747			
New Democratic hold		Swing		–0.90	
Source: Elections Ontario

2018 Ontario general election
Party	Candidate	Votes	%	±%
New Democratic	Laura Mae Lindo	20,512	43.38	+16.59
Progressive Conservative	Mary Henein Thorn	13,080	27.66	+2.46
Liberal	Daiene Vernile	9,499	20.09	–20.36
Green	Stacey Danckert	3,234	6.84	+0.57
Libertarian	Jason Erb	439	0.93	–
None of the Above	Chris Carr	429	0.91	–
Communist	Martin Suter	87	0.18	–
Total valid votes		47,280	98.42	
Total rejected, unmarked and declined ballots		757	1.58	+0.05
Turnout		48,037	58.27	+5.99
Eligible voters		82,445		
New Democratic notional gain from Liberal		Swing		+18.48
Source: Elections Ontario

^ Change based on redistributed results

2014 general election redistributed results
Party	Vote	%
Liberal	16,078	40.45
New Democratic	10,648	26.79
Progressive Conservative	10,018	25.20
Green	2,493	6.27
Others	510	1.28

2014 Ontario general election
Party	Candidate	Votes	%	±%
Liberal	Daiene Vernile	18,472	43.14	+3.92
Progressive Conservative	Wayne Wettlaufer	11,550	26.98	–11.43
New Democratic	Margaret Johnston	9,765	22.81	+3.99
Green	Ronnie Smith	2,472	5.77	+3.38
Libertarian	Patrick Bernier	557	1.30	+0.69
Total valid votes		42,816	98.47	
Total rejected, unmarked and declined ballots		665	1.53	+1.09
Turnout		43,481	52.28	+3.12
Eligible voters		83,170		
Liberal hold		Swing		+7.67
Source: Elections Ontario

2011 Ontario general election
Party	Candidate	Votes	%	±%
Liberal	John Milloy	15,392	39.23	–6.67
Progressive Conservative	Dave MacDonald	15,069	38.40	+12.90
New Democratic	Cameron Dearlove	7,385	18.82	+1.21
Green	Mark Vercouteren	938	2.39	–5.91
Libertarian	Patrick Bernier	240	0.61	–
Independent	Mark Corbiere	137	0.35	–
Freedom	Bugra Atsiz	77	0.20	–
Total valid votes		39,238	99.56	
Total rejected, unmarked and declined ballots		172	0.44	–0.26
Turnout		39,410	49.16	–0.42
Eligible voters		80,170		
Liberal hold		Swing		–9.78
Source: Elections Ontario

2007 Ontario general election
Party	Candidate	Votes	%	±%
Liberal	John Milloy	17,484	45.90	+4.15
Progressive Conservative	Matt Stanson	9,717	25.51	–11.87
New Democratic	Rick Moffitt	6,707	17.61	+2.09
Green	Daniel Logan	3,162	8.30	–
Family Coalition	William Bernhardt	599	1.57	–
Independent	John Donald McGuire	425	1.12	–
Total valid votes		38,094	99.30	
Total rejected, unmarked and declined ballots		267	0.70	–0.27
Turnout		38,361	49.58	–3.66
Eligible voters		77,376		
Liberal notional hold		Swing		+8.01
Source: Elections Ontario

^ Change based on redistributed results

2003 general election redistributed results
Party	Vote	%
Liberal	16,163	41.75
Progressive Conservative	14,472	37.38
New Democratic	6,009	15.52
Others	2,072	5.35

2003 Ontario general election
Party	Candidate	Votes	%	±%
Liberal	John Milloy	18,280	42.60	+2.68
Progressive Conservative	Wayne Wettlaufer	16,120	37.57	–12.58
New Democratic	Ted Martin	6,781	15.80	+8.05
Green	Luigi D'Agnillo	1,728	4.03	+2.78
Total valid votes		42,909	99.04	
Total rejected, unmarked and declined ballots		417	0.96	+0.17
Turnout		43,326	53.24	–4.14
Eligible voters		81,380		
Liberal gain from Progressive Conservative		Swing		+7.63
Source: Elections Ontario

1999 Ontario general election
Party	Candidate	Votes	%
Progressive Conservative	Wayne Wettlaufer	22,593	50.15
Liberal	Berry Vrbanovic	17,984	39.92
New Democratic	David Brohman	3,494	7.76
Green	Susan Koswan	561	1.25
Natural Law	Roy Anderson	204	0.45
Independent	Irvine James Conner	109	0.24
Independent	Julian Ichim	107	0.24
Total valid votes		45,052	99.21
Total rejected, unmarked and declined ballots		361	0.79
Turnout		45,413	57.38
Eligible voters		79,150	
Progressive Conservative pickup new district.			
Source: Elections Ontario

== 2007 electoral reform referendum ==
2007 Ontario electoral reform referendum
Side	Votes	%
First Past the Post	22,283	59.9
Mixed member proportional	14,932	40.1
Total valid votes	37,215	100.0

== See also ==
- List of Ontario provincial electoral districts
- Canadian provincial electoral districts

== Sources ==
- Elections Ontario Past Election Results
