= List of people from Guelph =

This is a list of notable people who are from Guelph, Ontario, or have spent a large part or formative part of their career in that city.

== A ==
- Rick Allain, former ice hockey coach
- Chad Archibald, producer
- Edward Robert Armstrong, engineer
- Ron Asselstine, NHL linesman
- Annie Damer, public health nurse

== B ==
- Charles L. Baine
- Carroll Baker
- Baracuda, rapper
- Kimberly Barber, vocal pedagogue
- Shaun Benson, actor
- Lois Betteridge, silversmith
- Katherine Bobak, skater
- Ralph Bowen, musician, educator
- Jeffry Hall Brock, businessman
- Alison Brooks, architect

== C ==
- Neve Campbell, actress
- Dom Cardillo, politician
- Dick Carroll, ice hockey coach
- Miranda Chartrand and Adam Nichols, musical duo
- Lionel Herbert Clarke, businessman and politician
- Jim Cockman, baseball player
- Thomas Christopher Collins, cardinal of the Catholic Church
- Bunk Congalton, baseball player
- Logan Couture, hockey player
- Arthur W. Cutten, businessman
- David Card, Nobel prize winning economist

== D ==
- Noah Danby, actor
- Ken Danby, painter
- Victor Davis, Olympic swimmer
- Brian Dickinson, pianist
- Crawford Douglas, politician

== E ==
- Bob Emslie, baseball player

== F ==
- Graham Fach, professional ten-pin bowler, first Canadian to win a title on the PBA Tour
- Rick Ferraro, former politician
- Albert Fish, politician
- Derek Fletcher, former politician
- Lou Fontinato, hockey player
- Charley Fox, former Flight Lieutenant in the Royal Canadian Air Force
- Karen Fralich, world sand sculpting champion
- J.M. Frey, novelist

== G ==
- Gregory Gallant
- Beth Goobie, poet
- Jim Guthrie, singer-songwriter
- James Gordon, singer-songwriter

== H ==
- Micheal Haley, ice hockey player
- Esther Hill, architect
- Peter Howitt (economist), winner of the Nobel Memorial Prize in Economic Sciences
- Albert Hughes, ice hockey player
- Mike Hudson, hockey player and amateur race car driver

== I ==
- John Inglis, founder of John Inglis and Company

== J ==
- Clifford Jackman, lawyer and writer
- Aurora James, creative director, activist, and fashion designer
- Edward Johnson, tenor
- Paddy Johnson, art critic
- David Jones, hockey player

== K ==
- Zoë Keating, cellist
- Patrick Kerwin, 10th Chief Justice of Canada
- Donnie Keshawarz, actor
- Thomas King, novelist
- Tim Kingsbury, musician
- Charles Kingsmill, former first director of the Department of the Naval Service of Canada
- Luke Kirby, actor
- Henry Kock, horticulturalist

== L ==
- Lionel (artist), anonymous street artist
- Gary Leadston, politician
- Laura Lemon, composer
- Andrea Lindsay, singer-songwriter
- Jean Little, writer
- Livestock, rapper
- Douglas Lochhead, poet
- Lloyd Longfield, politician
- Lucy, Lady Duff-Gordon, fashion designer
- David Lush, politician

== M ==
- John Kenneth Macalister, World War II personnel
- Andrew Paul MacDonald, composer
- Dan MacKenzie, sports administrator and marketing executive
- Dorothy Maclean, writer and educator
- Brian MacLellan, general manager of 2018 Stanley Cup Champion Washington Capitals
- Earl MacNaughton, founding dean of the College of Physics at the University of Guelph
- William Austin Mahoney, architect
- Des McAnuff, artistic director
- Doug McCaig, hockey player
- David Ross McCord, lawyer
- John McCrae, soldier, poet and physician
- Ambre McLean, singer-songwriter
- George McPhee, president of hockey operations for the Vegas Golden Knights and former general manager for the Washington Capitals
- Jean Mills, children's author
- Miranda Mulholland, fiddle player and singer
- Robert Munsch, children's author

== N ==
- Joe Neilands, biochemist
- Noah23, hip hop artist
- Craig Norris, rock singer

== O ==
- Kady O'Malley, journalist
- Jenny Omnichord, musician
- George Turner Orton, politician

== P ==
- Arthur Palmer, scholar
- Gregory Pepper, musician
- Joseph Petric, accordionist
- Alexander Fraser Pirie, journalist
- Brad Pirie, former ice hockey player
- George Pirie, newspaper publisher
- Zachary Pollari, football player

== R ==
- Mark Radoja, Professional poker player
- Jus Reign, YouTuber
- Tommy Reilly, harmonica player
- Sue Richards, artist
- Kelly Richardson, artist
- Aaron Riches, sing/songwriter
- Doug Risebrough, hockey player
- Thomas F. Ryan, sportsman and entrepreneur

== S ==
- Sandra Sabatini, writer
- Liz Sandals, politician
- Joe Sawyer, actor
- Ray Scapinello, linesman
- Henry Scholfield, politician
- James Schroder, politician
- Ron Scott, hockey player
- Andrea Seccafien, Olympic athlete
- Surendra Seeraj, cricket player
- Seth, cartoonist
- T. Sher Singh, lawyer
- Joey Slinger, journalist and author
- Gavin Smith, poker player
- John Snobelen, former politician
- Dave Somerville, singer
- J. Dewey Soper, ornithologist
- Ned Sparks, actor
- Doug Stinson, mathematician
- David Stirton, politician
- Donna Strickland, Nobel Prize winner
- Mary Swan, novelist
- Bill Sweeney, hockey player

== T ==
- Janis Tarchuk, politician
- Chuck Tatham, screenwriter
- Percy A. Taverner, ornithologist

== V ==
- Frank Valeriote, politician
- Reg Vermue, musician

== W ==
- Charles Wilson, composer
- Robert Wickens, race car driver
- Al Wiley, Canadian football player
- Corey Wood, musician
- Joshua Workman, political consultant
