= Tamarack (band) =

- Origin: Guelph, Ontario, Canada
- Genre: Folk
- Years active: 1978–present
- Members: Alex Sinclair; Molly Kurvink; Duncan Cameron
- Past members: James Gordon; Jeff Bird; Randy Sutherland; Melanie Doane; Duncan Cameron; Gwen Swick; Shelley Coopersmith
- Website: http://www.tamarackfolk.com/

Tamarack is a Canadian folk music group, formed in 1978 by James Gordon, Jeff Bird and Randy Sutherland. Tamarack draws heavily on traditional themes. Their début album Music of Canada consists almost entirely of traditional songs. Later albums included a number of songs penned by band members but maintaining the traditional folk/roots style.

The history and geography of Canada are also popular inspirations. Frobisher Bay and its title track "Frozen in Frobisher Bay" are named after a bay on Baffin Island in the Canadian Arctic. Leaving Inverarden starts with two stories taken from the history of the fur-trading North West Company in Canada: the title track "Leaving Invergarden" based on the story of John MacDonald, and the track "Magdalen McGillivray" about his sister who married William McGillivray.

The members of the group have changed over the years. By 1986, Alex Sinclair had replaced Randy Sutherland. Melanie Doane was a member for a time, performing with them on their 1989 video On the Rideau. Andrea Barstad joined the group in 1989. When Fields of Rock and Snow was released in 1991, Jeff Bird left and Gwen Swick joined. Molly Kurvink joined the group for the Leaving Inverarden album released in 1995. James Gordon is no longer part of the group when Spirit & Stone (2000) was recorded, which features Alex Sinclair, Molly Kurvink and Shelley Coopersmith. Shelley Coopersmith left the group in 2002, being replaced by Duncan Cameron

Tamarack has often been invited to perform at Canadian folk festivals. They have frequently played the Hillside Festival (1985, 1988, 1991, 1994, 1999), in Guelph, Ontario, which is home base for several members of the group. Other festivals where they have been featured include the Winnipeg Folk Festival (1984), Ottawa Folk Festival (1997), and The Shelter Valley Folk Festival (2010). In 1997, they were inaugurated into the Order of the Porcupine Music Hall of Fame by Sugar Camp Music, a radio show produced by the University of Toronto campus radio station CIUT-FM.

A number of Tamarack songs have been covered by other artists. "Mining for Gold", written by James Gordon based on a traditional theme, was on the Cowboy Junkies breakthrough album The Trinity Session (early Tamarack member Jeff Bird has done instrumental work on many Cowboy Junkies albums). Folk singer Laura Smith included the Leaving Inverarden song "Magdalen McGillivray" on her 2012 album Everything is Moving

== Discography ==
Year	Title	Label
1980	Music of Canada	SGB Productions
1983	A Pleasant Gale	SGB Productions
1984	Ontario: 200 Musical Years	
1986	The Tamarack Collection	SGB Productions
1989	Shave The Bear	SGB Productions
1991	Fields of Rock and Snow	
1993	Frobisher Bay	Wind River
1993	On The Grand	Wind River
1993	On the Prairies	
1995	Leaving Inverarden	Wind River
1995	The Fifteenth Anniversary Concert (live)	
1996	Muskoka's Calling	
1997	Thirteen	Wind River
1995	Leaving Inverarden	Wind River
1998	Blankets of Snow	SGB Productions
2000	Spirit & Stone	Wind River
2001	Tree	SGB Productions
