= Frobisher Bay (disambiguation) =

Frobisher Bay is an inlet of the Davis Strait in the Qikiqtaaluk Region of Nunavut, Canada.

Frobisher Bay may also refer to:

- Iqaluit, the territorial capital of Nunavut, Canada, known as Frobisher Bay 1942–1987
- Frobisher Bay Airport, now Iqaluit Airport, founded at various locations near Frobisher Bay
- "Frozen in Frobisher Bay", also known as "Frobisher Bay", a song by James Gordon
