= Winegard =

Winegard is a surname. Notable people with the surname include:

- Scott Winegard, American bassist of Texas Is the Reason
- William Winegard (1924–2019), Canadian politician
