= Earl MacNaughton =

Canadian physicist

Earl Bruce MacNaughton (1919 – January 5, 2015) was the founding dean of the College of Physics at the University of Guelph.

Earl MacNaughton was born near the town of Maple, Ontario in 1919 to Richard Daniel MacNaughton and Pearl Eleanor née Smelser. He attended primary school in Maple, commuted by train to Aurora for secondary school, and then attended the University of Toronto. He graduated from there with a master's degree majoring in physics, Chemistry and Mathematics in 1941. It was in the middle of World War II, and MacNaughton initially served as a civilian training Armed Forces personnel in electronics. Eventually, he joined the Royal Canadian Navy and served in the area of operational research. After the war, he returned to the University of Toronto and graduated with a Ph.D. in physics in 1948.

MacNaughton then began teaching physics at the Ontario Agricultural College. In 1952, he was promoted to Head of the Physics Department. Soon after the Ontario Agricultural College was merged with the Ontario Veterinary College in 1964, he became the Associate Dean of Wellington College of Arts and Science at the newly formed University of Guelph. He was installed as the Dean of the College of Physical Sciences (later included Engineering) when it was first opened in 1970. The university renamed the main physical science building after him when he retired in 1981.

"He was a tower of strength" at the university, said William Winegard, who was University of Guelph's president from 1967 to 1975. "We would talk about what was needed, and he had lots of ideas, and he would just go out and do it. He was always thinking of the university and what was best for the university. Earl was one of the finest people you could ever meet," and he was a "tremendous dean" who worked hard to make his college a topnotch school. He was a wonderful man, and you wouldn't find anybody at the College of Physical Science who didn't like their dean."

MacNaughton and his wife Jean (Robinson) had two daughters. Daughter Janis MacNaughton became a doctor of internal medicine in Stratford, Ontario, and daughter Liz Sandals became the Member of Provincial Parliament (Ontario) for Guelph and rose to the cabinet post of Minister of Education.
