= Brenda Chamberlain (politician) =

Canadian politician (born 1952)

The Honourable Brenda Kay Chamberlain PC

Member of Parliament for Guelph
- In office June 28, 2004 – April 7, 2008
- Preceded by: new riding
- Succeeded by: Frank Valeriote

Member of Parliament for Guelph—Wellington
- In office October 25, 1993 – June 28, 2004
- Preceded by: William Winegard
- Succeeded by: riding abolished

Personal details
- Born: April 9, 1952 (age 74) Toronto, Ontario, Canada
- Party: Liberal
- Spouse: David Chamberlain
- Profession: Education administrator

Brenda Kay Chamberlain, PC (born April 9, 1952) is a former member of the House of Commons of Canada, representing the riding of Guelph for the Liberal Party from 1993 until her resignation as of April 7, 2008.

== Early life ==
Chamberlain was born in Toronto, Ontario. She was a home daycare owner and operator from 1979 to 1983, and served as the administrative assistant in a family-owned business from 1984 to 1987. She also served as Executive Director of the Wellington County Literacy Council from 1989 to 1993, and of the Guelph-Wellington Career Educational Council from 1992 to 1993. During this time she also served on the Wellington County Board of Education (1985–1993).

== Career ==
Chamberlain sought the federal Liberal nomination in Guelph-Wellington in 1992. Chamberlain's main challenger for the nomination was to be former Liberal Member of Parliament Frank Maine, who represented Guelph in the House of Commons from 1974 to 1979. Maine dropped out of the race after the riding's nomination meeting was scheduled for an early date, arguing that this favoured Chamberlain. Chamberlain went on to win the Liberal nomination by acclamation. Maine later decided to run as an independent candidate against Chamberlain in the 1993 federal election. Chamberlain was elected handily as the Liberals took all but one of Ontario's 101 seats—the closest any party has come to sweeping the country's biggest province at the federal level.

Chamberlain was re-elected by greater margins in the elections of 1997 and 2000. For many years, she was known as a strong supporter of Paul Martin in his bid to succeed Jean Chrétien as leader of the Liberal Party.

Chamberlain won another easy victory in the election of 2004, defeating her Conservative opponent by nearly 10,000 votes in the redistributed riding of Guelph.

Chamberlain was elected a fifth time in the election of 2006, in which the Conservative Party won a national minority government.

She was one of the more socially conservative members of the Liberal caucus, and was a vocal opponent of her own party's plans to decriminalize the possession of small amounts of marijuana. Chamberlain also voted against her party's same-sex marriage bill in 2005. She was also involved in legislation which forced Bell Canada to revise its 411 billing policy.

Chamberlain served as parliamentary secretary to the Minister of Labour from 1997 to 1999, and was parliamentary secretary to the president of the Queen's Privy Council, with special emphasis on public service reform and Métis and Non-Status Indians, from December 2003 to July 2004.

Although opposition spread rumours that she was about to retire she stood for re-election in 2006 and won handily. Just over two years later, on March 7, 2008, Chamberlain announced her resignation from the House of Commons effective April 7. She did not provide a reason for her resignation. During that election and thereafter the Guelph Mercury subjected Chamberlain to increasing degrees of criticism. Hansard will show that Chamberlain's last official votes occurred during the finals of weeks of February 2008. Subsequently, a by-election was called to replace her. Frank Valeriote ran for the Liberal Party in Guelph. However, Prime Minister Stephen Harper called prior to the by-election date, rendering it moot. Frank Valeriote was elected as MP for Guelph in the general election.

She was elected for twenty-four consecutive years of public service.

== Electoral record ==
2006 Canadian federal election: Guelph
Party	Candidate	Votes	%	±%	Expenditures
Liberal	Brenda Chamberlain	23,662	38.39	−6.22	$56,158
Conservative	Brent Barr	18,342	29.76	+3.65	$80,104
New Democratic	Phil Allt	13,561	22.00	+1.97	$30,173
Green	Mike Nagy	5,376	8.72	+1.37	$27,621
Christian Heritage	Peter Ellis	538	0.87	−0.33	$4,880
Communist	Scott Gilbert	111	0.18	–	$280
Marxist–Leninist	Manuel Couto	45	0.07	−0.05	none listed
Total valid votes/expense limit		61,635	100.00		
Total rejected ballots		215	0.35	−0.22	
Turnout		61,850	70.76	+6.58	
Electors on the lists		87,410			
Sources: Official Results, Elections Canada and Financial Returns, Elections Canada.

2004 Canadian federal election: Guelph
Party	Candidate	Votes	%	±%	Expenditures
Liberal	Brenda Chamberlain	23,442	44.61	−3.58	$60,734
Conservative	Jon Dearden	13,721	26.11	−12.57	$61,179
New Democratic	Phil Allt	10,527	20.03	+9.67	$27,613
Green	Mike Nagy	3,866	7.36	+5.60	$15,304
Christian Heritage	Peter Ellis	634	1.21	+0.71	$5,059
Marijuana	Lyne Rivard	291	0.55	–	none listed
Marxist–Leninist	Manuel Couto	66	0.13	–	none listed
Total valid votes/expense limit		52,547	100.00		
Total rejected ballots		303	0.57	+0.24	
Turnout		52,850	64.18	+3.07	
Electors on the lists		82,346			
Note: Percentage change figures are factored for redistribution. Conservative Party percentages are contrasted with the combined Canadian Alliance and Progressive Conservative percentages from 2000.
Sources: Official Results, Elections Canada and Financial Returns, Elections Canada.

2000 Canadian federal election: Guelph—Wellington
Party	Candidate	Votes	%	±%	Expenditures
Liberal	Brenda Chamberlain	26,440	48.19	+0.46	$31,978
Alliance	Max Layton	11,037	20.12	+2.83	$51,423
Progressive Conservative	Marie Adsett	10,188	18.57	−2.74	$19,049
New Democratic	Edward Pickersgill	5,685	10.36	−0.05	$26,212
Green	Bill Hulet	966	1.76	+0.64	$201
Christian Heritage	Gord Truscott	275	0.50	−1.35	$3,119
Canadian Action	Sharon Tanti	207	0.38		$3,244
Marxist–Leninist	Manuel Couto	68	0.12	−0.15	$8
Total valid votes		54,866	100.00		
Total rejected ballots		181	0.33	−0.35	
Turnout		55,047	61.11	−5.53	
Electors on the lists		90,076			
Sources: Official Results, Elections Canada and Financial Returns, Elections Canada.

1997 Canadian federal election: Guelph—Wellington
Party	Candidate	Votes	%	±%	Expenditures
Liberal	Brenda Chamberlain	25,004	47.73	+7.70	$37,750
Progressive Conservative	Dick Stewart	11,160	21.31	+0.72	$56,755
Reform	Lyle McNair	9,054	17.28	−6.39	$30,052
New Democratic	Elaine Rogala	5,456	10.42	+5.53	$20,301
Christian Heritage	Peter Ellis	972	1.86		$7,503
Green	Frank Marchetti	589	1.12		$5
Marxist–Leninist	Elaine Couto	146	0.28		$0
Total valid votes		52,381	100.00		
Total rejected ballots		357	0.68	−0.25	
Turnout		52,738	66.64	+0.14	
Electors on the lists		79,141			
Sources: Official Results, Elections Canada and Financial Returns, Elections Canada. Percentage change figures are factored for redistribution.

1993 Canadian federal election: Guelph—Wellington
Party	Candidate	Votes	%	Expenditures
Liberal	Brenda Chamberlain	24,359	39.24	$42,976
Reform	Gerry Organ	15,483	24.94	$45,760
Progressive Conservative	Bill Scott	12,825	20.66	$57,999
Non-Affiliated	Frank Maine	3,465	5.58	$29,745
New Democratic Party	Alex Michalos	2,904	4.68	$27,092
National	Maggie Laidlaw	2,018	3.25	$6,098
Green	Simon C. Francis	318	0.51	$0
Natural Law	David W. Mitchell	255	0.41	$12
Libertarian	Tom Bradburn	247	0.40	$0
Canada Party	John H. Long	108	0.17	$600
N/A (Renewal)	Anna Di Carlo	78	0.13	$0
Abolitionist	Andrew Tait	20	0.03	$0
Total valid votes		62,080	100.00	
Total rejected ballots		583	0.93	
Turnout		62,663	67.20	
Electors on the lists		93,250		
Source: Thirty-fifth General Election, 1993: Official Voting Results, Published by the Chief Electoral Officer of Canada. Financial figures taken from official contributions and expenses provided by Elections Canada.
