= Sweaters for Penguins =

Song by James Gordon

from the album Tune Cooties
- Released: August 2002
- Songwriter(s): James Gordon

"Sweaters for Penguins" is a song written by James Gordon for the CBC Radio program Basic Black. It describes a true incident, in which penguin sweaters were requested to help rehabilitate little penguins injured by oil spills in Tasmania.

== Discography ==
- James Gordon's Tune Cooties
- Cathy Miller's A Quilter's World
