= Gerry Organ =

Canadian football player

No. 71
- Positions: Kicker, Punter, Wide receiver

Personal information
- Born: December 4, 1944 (age 81); Cheltenham, England
- Listed height: 6 ft 2 in (1.88 m)
- Listed weight: 200 lb (91 kg)

Career information
- University: Guelph
- CFL draft: 1971: undrafted

Career history
- 1971–1983: Ottawa Rough Riders

Awards and highlights
- 2× Grey Cup champion (1973, 1976); CFL's Most Outstanding Canadian (1973); CFL East All-Star (1982); Ottawa Rough Riders #71 retired; Ottawa Rough Rider record, most career points (1,462); University of Guelph Athletics Hall of Fame (1984)

Gerry Organ (born December 4, 1944) is a former professional Canadian football placekicker and punter for the Ottawa Rough Riders of the Canadian Football League. He played for 13 seasons for the Rough Riders, playing in three Grey Cup games, winning two championships in 1973 and 1976. Organ played in 176 games in the CFL and is Ottawa's all-time leader in points scored with 1,462. He is the only kicker to have won the CFL's Most Outstanding Canadian Award, which he won in 1973. He played college football with the Guelph Gryphons.

He was inducted in the University of Guelph Hall of Fame in 1984. As a member of the Guelph Gryphons, he was named to the All-Canadian team in 1969.

He was the Reform Party candidate in the 1993 federal election for the riding of Guelph-Wellington, but lost to Brenda Chamberlain.
