= Guelph (provincial electoral district) =

Provincial electoral district in Ontario, Canada

Coordinates: 43°33′N 80°15′W

Ontario electoral district
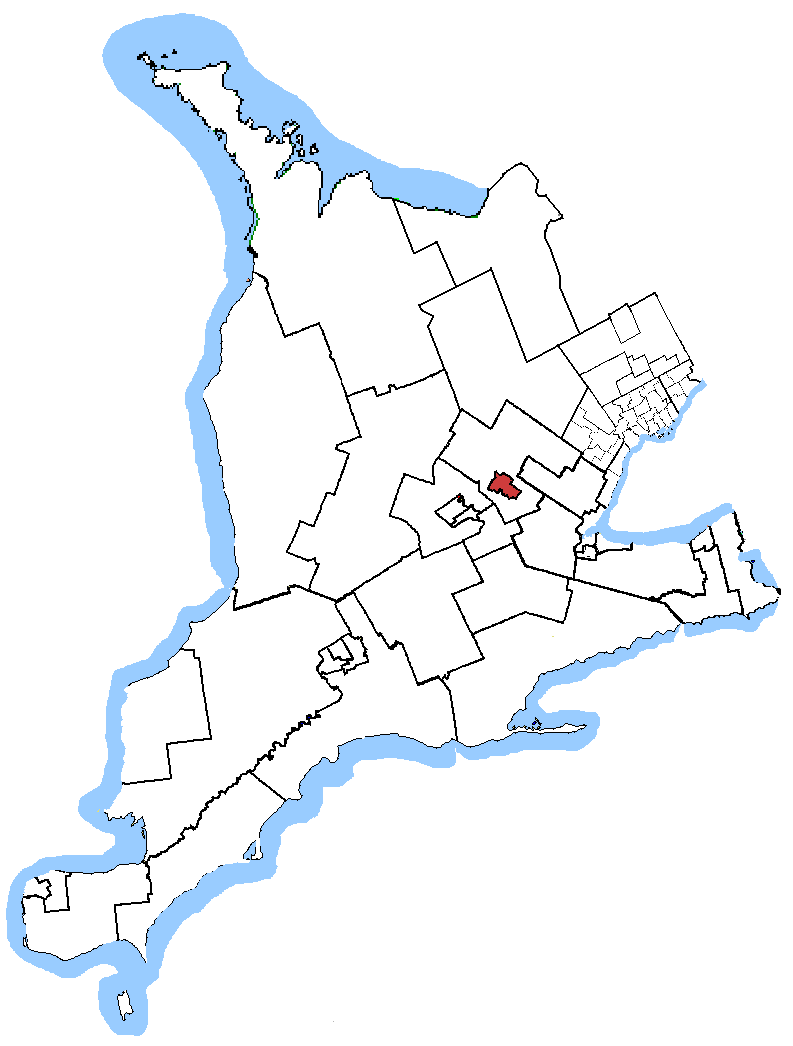
- Guelph in relation to other southwestern Ontario electoral districts

Provincial electoral district
- Legislature: Legislative Assembly of Ontario
MPP
Mike Schreiner
Green
- District created: 2004
- First contested: 2007
- Last contested: 2025

Demographics
- Population (2021): 143,740
- Electors (2025): 115,454
- Area (km²): 88
- Pop. density (per km²): 1,633.4
- Census division: Wellington County
- Census subdivision: Guelph

Guelph is a provincial electoral district in southwestern Ontario, Canada. It has been represented in the Legislative Assembly of Ontario from 1987 until 1999, and again from 2007 to present. The riding was created from portions of the Guelph—Wellington riding. The riding includes all of the city of Guelph.

== Members of Provincial Parliament ==
Guelph
Assembly	Years	Member	Party
Riding created
34th	1987–1990	Enrico Ferraro	Liberal
35th	1990–1995	Derek Fletcher	New Democratic
36th	1995–1999	Brenda Elliott	Progressive Conservative
Riding dissolved
Riding created from Guelph—Wellington
39th	2007–2011	Liz Sandals	Liberal
40th	2011–2014	Liz Sandals	Liberal
41st	2014–2018	Liz Sandals	Liberal
42nd	2018–2022	Mike Schreiner	Green
43rd	2022–2025	Mike Schreiner	Green
44th	2025–present	Mike Schreiner	Green

== Election results ==
=== 2025 ===
At the 2025 election, Green Party of Ontario leader Mike Schreiner was elected to his third consecutive term as MPP.

2025 Ontario general election
Party	Candidate	Votes	%	±%	Expenditures
Green	Mike Schreiner	34,238	56.94	+2.49	$91,228
Progressive Conservative	Robert Coole	14,386	23.92	+3.52	$20,305
Liberal	Mustafa Zuberi	6,874	11.43	–1.86	$40,857
New Democratic	Cameron Spence	3,497	5.82	–2.24	$11,248
New Blue	Carina Fraser	1,137	1.89	–1.07	$658
Total valid votes/expense limit		60,132	99.55	–	$190,226
Total rejected, unmarked and declined ballots		270	0.45	–0.03	
Turnout		60,402	51.12	+1.73	
Eligible voters		118,153			
Green hold		Swing		–0.52	
Source: Elections Ontario

=== 2022 ===
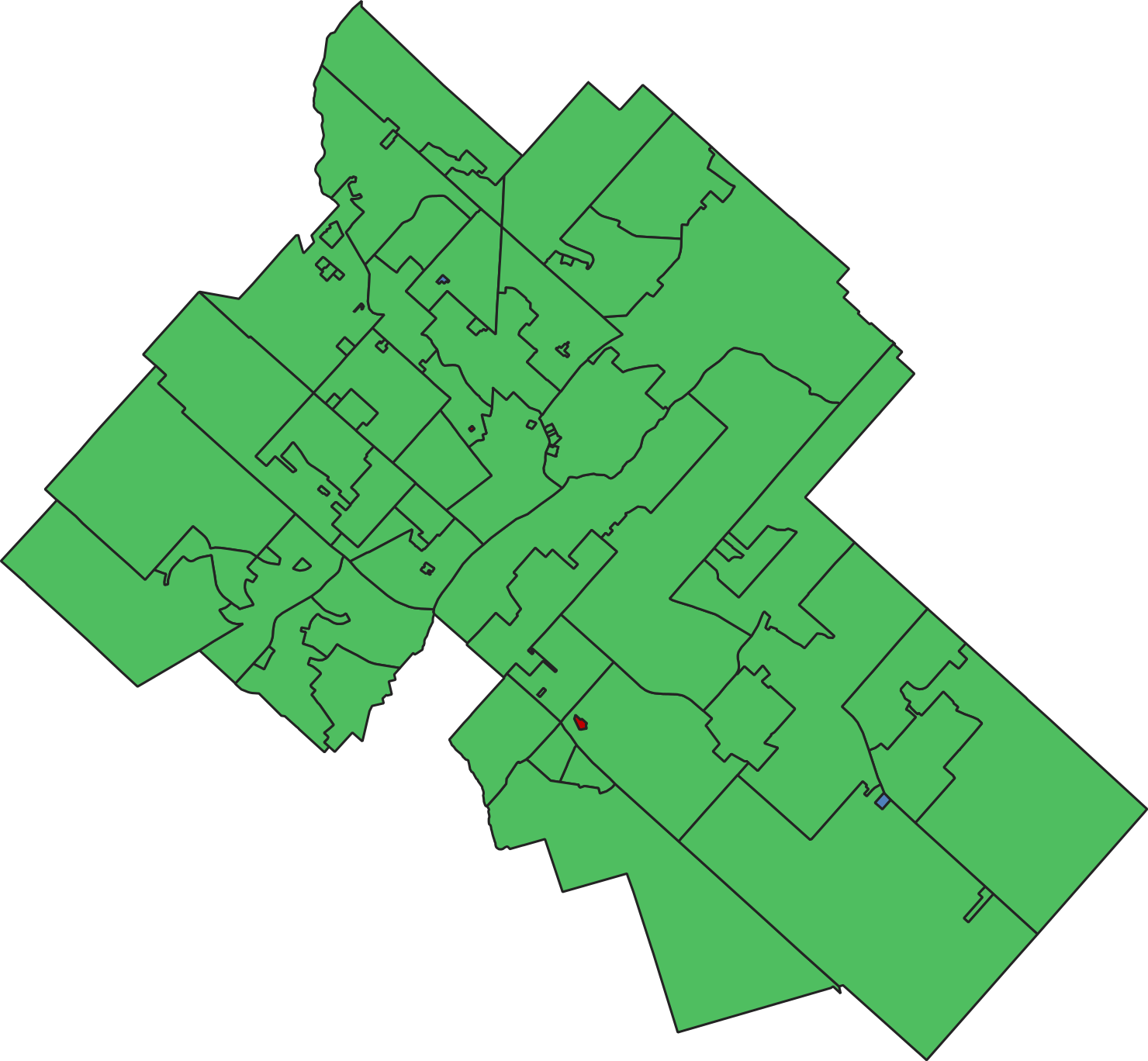
Winner in each polling division in Guelph at the 2022 Ontario General Election

At the 2022 election, the Greens polled the most votes in all but four polling divisions across the riding.

2022 Ontario general election
Party	Candidate	Votes	%	±%	Expenditures
Green	Mike Schreiner	29,752	54.45	+9.42	$110,235
Progressive Conservative	Peter McSherry	11,149	20.41	–1.40	$3,934
Liberal	Raechelle Devereaux	7,263	13.29	+3.17	$76,859
New Democratic	James Parr	4,402	8.06	–13.51	$41,943
New Blue	Will Lomker	1,619	2.96	–	$2,919
Communist	Juanita Burnett	251	0.46	+0.29	$0
None of the Above	Paul Taylor	202	0.37	–0.18	$0
Total valid votes/expense limit		54,638	99.53	–	$155,606
Total rejected, unmarked and declined ballots		260	0.47	–0.30	
Turnout		54,898	49.39	–11.73	
Eligible voters		111,147			
Green hold		Swing		+5.41	
Source: Elections Ontario

=== 1987-2018 ===
2018 Ontario general election
Party	Candidate	Votes	%	±%
Green	Mike Schreiner	29,082	45.03	+25.74
Progressive Conservative	Ray Ferraro	14,084	21.81	+0.97
New Democratic	Agnieszka Mlynarz	13,929	21.57	+3.87
Liberal	Sly Castaldi	6,537	10.12	–31.39
None of the Above	Paul Taylor	358	0.55	–
Libertarian	Michael Riehl	297	0.46	+0.14
Ontario Party	Thomas Mooney	181	0.28	–
Communist	Juanita Burnett	109	0.17	–0.17
Total valid votes		64,577	99.22	
Total rejected, unmarked and declined ballots		505	0.78	–0.27
Turnout		65,082	61.12	+5.65
Eligible voters		106,481		
Green gain from Liberal		Swing		+12.38
Source: Elections Ontario

2014 Ontario general election
Party	Candidate	Votes	%	±%
Liberal	Liz Sandals	22,014	41.52	–0.92
Progressive Conservative	Anthony Macdonald	11,048	20.84	–4.76
Green	Mike Schreiner	10,230	19.29	+12.37
New Democratic	James Gordon	9,385	17.70	–6.18
Communist	Juanita Burnett	178	0.34	+0.04
Libertarian	Blair Smythe	170	0.32	–0.33
Total valid votes		53,025	98.95	
Total rejected, unmarked and declined ballots		562	1.05	+0.61
Turnout		53,587	55.47	+5.21
Eligible voters		96,599		
Liberal hold		Swing		+1.92
Source: Elections Ontario

2011 Ontario general election
Party	Candidate	Votes	%	±%
Liberal	Liz Sandals	19,815	42.43	+1.52
Progressive Conservative	Greg Schirk	11,954	25.60	+1.11
New Democratic	James Gordon	11,150	23.88	+10.04
Green	Steven Dyck	3,234	6.93	–12.68
Libertarian	Philip Bender	305	0.65	–
Communist	Drew Garvie	139	0.30	–0.04
Independent	Julian Ichim	100	0.21	–
Total valid votes		46,697	99.56	
Total rejected, unmarked and declined ballots		206	0.44	–0.18
Turnout		46,903	50.27	–6.77
Eligible voters		93,308		
Liberal hold		Swing		+0.21
Source: Elections Ontario

2007 Ontario general election
Party	Candidate	Votes	%	±%
Liberal	Liz Sandals	20,346	40.92	–1.30
Progressive Conservative	Bob Senechal	12,180	24.49	–12.59
Green	Ben Polley	9,750	19.61	+12.61
New Democratic	Karan Mann-Bowers	6,880	13.84	+1.78
Family Coalition	John G. Gots	405	0.81	–0.82
Communist	Drew Garvie	166	0.33	–
Total valid votes		49,727	99.38	
Total rejected, unmarked and declined ballots		311	0.62	–
Turnout		50,038	57.03	–
Eligible voters		87,736		
Liberal gain from Progressive Conservative		Swing		+5.65
Source: Elections Ontario

1995 Ontario general election
Party	Candidate	Votes	%	±%
Progressive Conservative	Brenda Elliott	17,204	42.55	+16.90
Liberal	Rick Ferraro	11,459	28.34	–1.74
New Democratic	Derek Fletcher	10,278	25.42	–12.49
Family Coalition	John G. Gots	1,035	2.56	–1.48
Libertarian	Tom Bradburn	265	0.66	–
Independent	Anna Di Carlo	187	0.46	–
Total valid votes		40,428	98.82	
Total rejected, unmarked and declined ballots		482	1.18	+0.02
Turnout		40,910	66.31	–3.17
Eligible voters		61,691		
Progressive Conservative gain from New Democratic		Swing		+9.32
Source: Elections Ontario

1990 Ontario general election
Party	Candidate	Votes	%	±%
New Democratic	Derek Fletcher	15,051	37.91	+10.70
Liberal	Rick Ferraro	11,944	30.08	–24.96
Progressive Conservative	Linda Lennon	10,184	25.65	+9.59
Family Coalition	John G. Gots	1,602	4.04	–
Green	Bill Hulet	920	2.32	–
Total valid votes		39,701	98.84	
Total rejected, unmarked and declined ballots		466	1.16	+0.64
Turnout		40,167	69.48	+7.32
Eligible voters		57,811		
New Democratic gain from Liberal		Swing		+17.83
Source: Elections Ontario

1987 Ontario general election
Party	Candidate	Votes	%
Liberal	Rick Ferraro	18,445	55.04
New Democratic	Derek Fletcher	9,119	27.21
Progressive Conservative	Bob Pierce	5,383	16.06
Independent	Craig Sanderson	562	1.68
Total valid votes		33,509	99.48
Total rejected ballots		176	0.52
Turnout		33,685	62.16
Eligible voters		54,188	
Liberal pickup new district.			
Source: Elections Ontario

== 2007 electoral reform referendum ==
2007 Ontario electoral reform referendum
Side	Votes	%
First Past the Post	26,835	55.4
Mixed member proportional	21,629	44.6
Total valid votes	48,464	100.0

== See also ==
- List of Ontario provincial electoral districts
- Canadian provincial electoral districts

== Sources ==
- Elections Ontario Past Election Results
- Map of riding for 2018 election
