= Rick Ferraro =

Canadian politician

Ontario MPP
- In office 1987–1990
- Preceded by: New riding
- Succeeded by: Derek Fletcher
- Constituency: Guelph
- In office 1985–1987
- Preceded by: Harry Worton
- Succeeded by: Riding abolished
- Constituency: Wellington South

Personal details
- Born: January 7, 1950 (age 76) Guelph, Ontario
- Party: Liberal
- Occupation: Business owner

Enrico Eugenio "Rick" Ferraro (born January 7, 1950) is a former politician in Ontario, Canada. He was a Liberal member of the Legislative Assembly of Ontario from 1985 to 1990.

== Background ==
Ferraro was educated at the University of Guelph, and was a founder of Kids Can Play - Guelph. Ferraro is an active member of the Guelph community. He was a partner in Steele Ferraro Insurance Brokerage, he also owns the Grange and Victoria Plaza.

== Politics ==
He was elected to the Ontario legislature in the 1985 provincial election, defeating Progressive Conservative Marilyn Robinson by 5,006 votes in the constituency of Wellington South. He was re-elected by more than 9,000 votes over NDP candidate Derek Fletcher in the 1987 election, in the redistributed riding of Guelph.

Ferraro was a backbench supporter of David Peterson's government, and held several parliamentary assistant positions. In 1986, he was appointed as Ontario's first Small Business Advocate.

The Liberals were defeated by the NDP in the 1990 provincial election, and Ferraro lost his seat to Fletcher by 3,107 votes. He attempted a comeback in the 1995 election, but lost to Brenda Elliott of the Progressive Conservatives by just over 5,700 votes. His brother Ray Ferraro was a Guelph City Councillor and was the Progressive Conservative candidate in the 2018 Ontario Provincial Election , finishing second to Mike Schreiner of the Green Party .
