= Guelph—Wellington (provincial electoral district) =

Former provincial electoral district in Ontario, Canada

Guelph—Wellington was a provincial electoral district in Ontario, Canada, that was represented in the Legislative Assembly of Ontario from 1999 to 2007.

The riding was created in 1999 from Guelph and Wellington and abolished in 2007 back into Guelph and into Wellington—Halton Hills. It consisted of the city of Guelph as well as the townships of Puslinch and Guelph/Eramosa.

== Members of Provincial Parliament ==
Guelph—Wellington
Assembly	Years	Member	Party
Riding created from Guelph and Wellington
37th	1999–2003	Brenda Elliott	Progressive Conservative
38th	2003–2007	Liz Sandals	Liberal
Riding dissolved into Guelph and Wellington—Halton Hills

== Election results ==
2003 Ontario general election
Party	Candidate	Votes	%	±%
Liberal	Liz Sandals	23,607	42.22	+9.61
Progressive Conservative	Brenda Elliott	20,735	37.08	–14.49
New Democratic	James Valcke	6,745	12.06	+0.46
Green	Ben Polley	3,917	7.00	+5.56
Family Coalition	Alan John McDonald	914	1.63	–0.37
Total valid votes		55,918	99.38	
Total rejected, unmarked and declined ballots		351	0.62	–0.04
Turnout		56,269	60.08	+0.97
Eligible voters		93,654		
Liberal gain from Progressive Conservative		Swing		+12.05
Source: Elections Ontario

1999 Ontario general election
Party	Candidate	Votes	%	±%
Progressive Conservative	Brenda Elliott	26,246	51.57	+9.02
Liberal	Wayne E. Hyland	16,595	32.61	+4.27
New Democratic	Bruce Abel	5,907	11.61	–13.81
Family Coalition	John G. Gots	1,020	2.00	–0.56
Green	Bradley Shaw	733	1.44	–
Independent	Anna Di Carlo	396	0.78	+0.32
Total valid votes		50,897	99.33	
Total rejected, unmarked and declined ballots		342	0.67	–
Turnout		51,239	59.11	–
Eligible voters		86,679		
Progressive Conservative hold		Swing		+2.38
Source: Elections Ontario

== See also ==
- List of Ontario provincial electoral districts
- Canadian provincial electoral districts
