= Brenda Elliott =

Canadian politician

The Honourable Brenda Elliott ECO

Ontario MPP
- In office 1995–2003
- Preceded by: Derek Fletcher
- Succeeded by: Liz Sandals
- Constituency: Guelph

Personal details
- Born: October 27, 1950 (age 75) Goderich, Ontario, Canada
- Party: Progressive Conservative
- Profession: Teacher, librarian

Brenda Elliott ECO (born October 27, 1950) is a former Canadian politician in Ontario, Canada. She served in the Legislative Assembly of Ontario as a Progressive Conservative from 1995 to 2003, and was a cabinet minister in the governments of Mike Harris and Ernie Eves.

== Background ==
Elliott was born in Goderich, Ontario. She went to McMaster University, and worked as a teacher and librarian. In 1972, she was elected to the Wellington County Board of Education. She became interested in environmental causes during the 1990s, and in November 1989 opened a store in Guelph, Ontario called For Earth's Sake.

== Politics ==
Elliott was elected to the Ontario legislature in the 1995 provincial election, defeating former Liberal Member of Provincial Parliament (MPP) Rick Ferraro and incumbent New Democrat Derek Fletcher in the Guelph constituency. The Tories won a majority government in this election under Mike Harris's leadership, and Elliott was appointed as Minister of Environment and Energy on June 26, 1995.

Due to Elliott's background in the environmental movement, many believed she would be a strong advocate for "green" policies in the Harris cabinet. She was dropped from cabinet on August 16, 1996, and served as a backbench supporter in the legislature for the next three years.

Elliott was easily re-elected in the 1999 provincial election for the redistributed riding of Guelph—Wellington by about ten thousand votes. On February 8, 2001, she returned to cabinet as Minister of Intergovernmental Affairs. When Ernie Eves replaced Mike Harris as Premier of Ontario in 2002, he named Elliott as his Minister of Community, Family and Children's Services. Following the 2001 death of Kimberly Rogers, a coroner's inquest recommended changes to Ontario's welfare policies. As Minister of Community, Family and Children's Services, Elliot rejected calls to change the province's "zero tolerance" policy and lifetime welfare ban.

The Tories were defeated in the 2003 provincial election, and Elliott lost her seat to Liberal candidate Liz Sandals by 2,800 votes.

=== Cabinet positions ===
Eves ministry, Province of Ontario (2002–2003)
Cabinet post (1)
Predecessor	Office	Successor
John Baird	Minister of Community, Family, and Social Services; 2002–2003	Sandra Pupatello
Harris ministry, Province of Ontario (1995–2002)
Cabinet posts (2)
Predecessor	Office	Successor
Norm Sterling	Minister of Intergovernmental Affairs; 2001–2002	Ernie Eves
Bud Wildman	Minister of Environment and Energy; 1995–1996	Norm Sterling
