= Albert Fish (politician) =

Canadian politician (1922–2006)

Member of the Canadian Parliament for Guelph
- In office May 22, 1979 – February 17, 1980
- Preceded by: Riding created
- Succeeded by: James Schroder

Personal details
- Born: 1922 Preston, Lancashire, England
- Died: April 5, 2006 (aged 83–84)
- Party: Progressive Conservative

Albert Fish (1922 – April 5, 2006) was a Canadian realtor and Member of Parliament.

Born in Preston, England, he served in the Royal Air Force during World War II. In 1949, he emigrated to Canada and lived in Guelph, Ontario. He started working in real estate in 1954 and opened his own firm, Albert Fish Real Estate Limited, in 1957. After serving as President of the Ontario Real Estate Association, he became President of the Canadian Real Estate Association in 1973. In the 1979 federal election, he was elected to the Canadian House of Commons representing Guelph's electoral district as a Progressive Conservative Party candidate. He was defeated in the 1980 election.

In 1986, he became President of the International Real Estate Federation.

He died in 2006 of complications following a heart attack. Fish had previously suffered a heart attack during the 1980 election campaign.

== Electoral record ==
1979 Canadian federal election: Guelph
Party	Candidate	Votes	%
Progressive Conservative	Albert Fish	18,149	41.96
Liberal	Frank W. Maine	16,203	37.46
New Democratic	Jim Finamore	8,535	19.73
Independent	Joe Barabas	190	0.44
Libertarian	Brian Seymour	90	0.21
Marxist–Leninist	Robert Cruise	45	0.10
Communist	Alan G. Pickersgill	39	0.09
Total valid votes		43,251	100.00
