= Liz Sandals =

Canadian politician

The Honourable Liz Sandals ECO
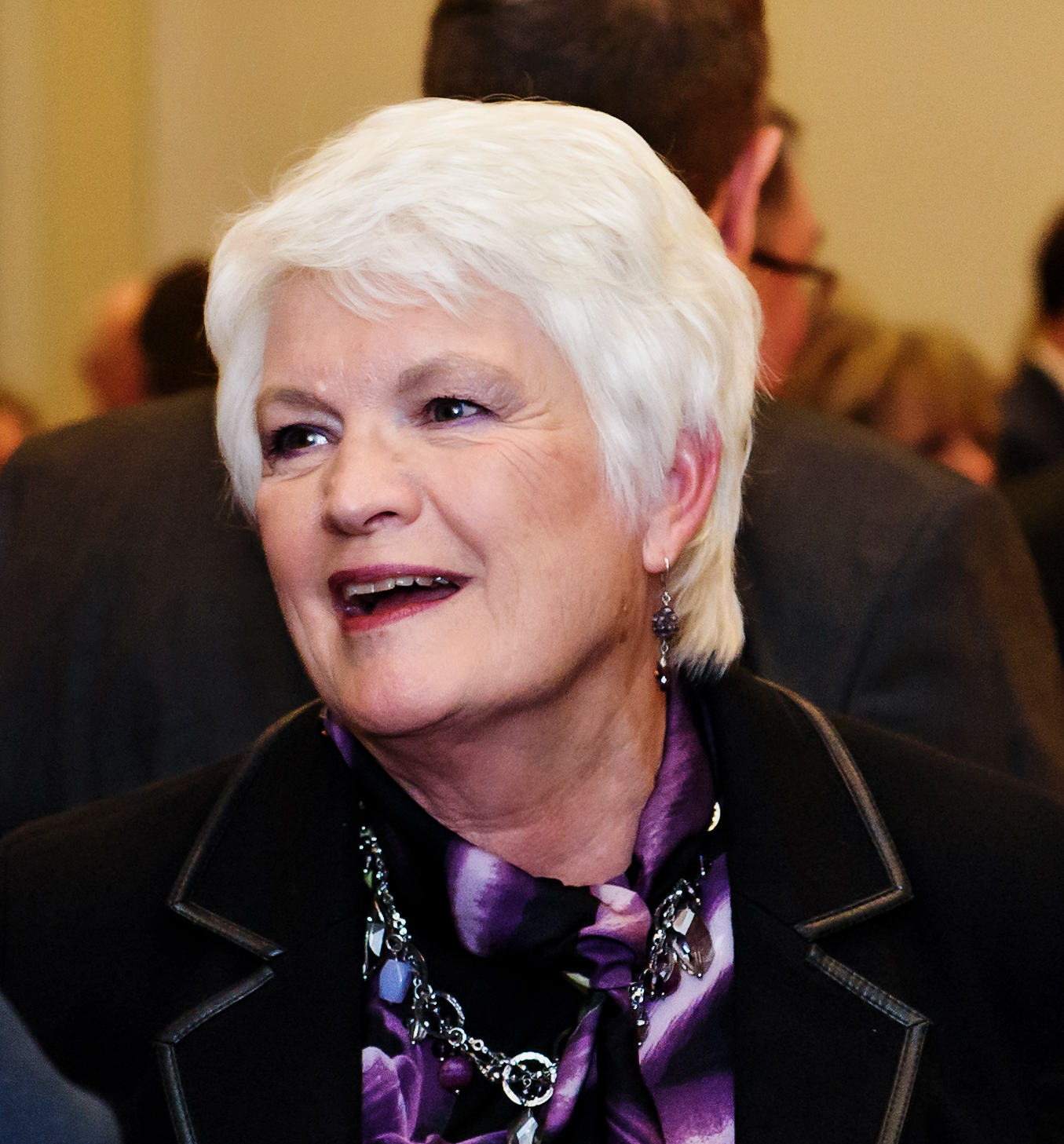
- Sandals at the 2017 ROMA Conference

Ontario MPP
- In office 2003–2018
- Preceded by: Brenda Elliott
- Succeeded by: Mike Schreiner
- Constituency: Guelph; Guelph—Wellington (2003-2007)

Personal details
- Born: Liz MacNaughton; 1947 (age 78–79) Guelph, Ontario
- Party: Liberal
- Spouse: David Sandals
- Children: 2
- Occupation: Teacher

Liz Sandals (née MacNaughton; born c. 1947) is a politician in Ontario, Canada. She was a Liberal member of the Legislative Assembly of Ontario from 2003 to 2018 who represented the ridings of Guelph—Wellington and Guelph. She served in cabinet as the President of the Treasury Board until January 17, 2018 and previously served for three years as Minister of Education in the government of Kathleen Wynne.

== Background ==
Sandals was born and raised in the Guelph, Ontario area as Liz MacNaughton. Her father, Earl MacNaughton was the founding dean of the College of Physics at the University of Guelph. She graduated from Guelph Collegiate Vocational Institute in 1966, and received a Bachelor of Science degree from the University of Guelph in 1969 as well as a Master of Mathematics degree from the University of Waterloo in 1971. She taught computer science at the University of Guelph. Sandals lives in Guelph with her husband David where they raised two children.

== Politics ==
=== School board ===
Sandals was elected to her local public school board in 1988, and was re-elected four times. From 1998 to 2002, she served as president of the Ontario Public School Boards Association. Sandals was the recipient of the first Outstanding Contribution to Education Award, granted by the Ontario Principals' Council.

=== Provincial politics ===
In 2003, she ran for the Ontario Liberal Party nomination in the riding of Guelph, and defeated two long-time Liberals. While she was a past supporter of the Progressive Conservative Party and worked for the 1995 campaign of rival Tory MPP Brenda Elliott, Sandals defeated Elliott in the Ontario provincial election of 2003 by 2,872 votes in the riding of Guelph—Wellington. During the 2003-2007 session she served as parliamentary assistant for several portfolios including Education. After being re-elected in 2007 in the redistributed riding of Guelph, she was again appointed as parliamentary assistant to portfolios including education and transportation. She was re-elected again in the 2011 election. On February 11, 2013, Sandals was appointed as the Minister of Education by Premier Kathleen Wynne. She was re-elected in 2014. On June 13, 2016, she was appointed as President of the Treasury Board.

As Minister of Education, Sandals oversaw the transition to a new collective bargaining system in the education system in Ontario. This new 2-tier collective bargaining structure resulted in new teacher contracts being signed with all of the major teachers' unions in 2015. Sandals also oversaw changes to the sex education curriculum, the first update to the curriculum since the late 1990s.

On October 6, 2017, she announced that she would not seek re-election in 2018.

=== Cabinet positions ===
Wynne ministry, Province of Ontario (2013–2018)
Cabinet posts (2)
Predecessor	Office	Successor
Deb Matthews	President of the Treasury Board; 2016-2018	Eleanor McMahon
Laurel Broten	Minister of Education; 2013–2016	Mitzie Hunter

=== Electoral record ===
2014 Ontario general election
Party	Candidate	Votes	%	±%
Liberal	Liz Sandals	22,014	41.52	-0.91
Progressive Conservative	Anthony MacDonald	11,048	20.84	-4.76
Green	Mike Schreiner	10,230	19.29	+12.36
New Democratic	James Gordon	9,385	17.70	-6.18
Communist	Juanita Burnett	178	0.34	+0.04
Libertarian	Blair Smythe	170	0.32	-0.33
Total valid votes		53,025	100.00	
Liberal hold		Swing		+1.92
Source: Elections Ontario

2011 Ontario general election
Party	Candidate	Votes	%	±%
Liberal	Liz Sandals	19,734	42.3	+1.5
Progressive Conservative	Greg Schirk	11,950	25.6	+0.9
New Democratic	James Gordon	11,148	23.9	+10.0
Green	Steve Dyck	3,234	6.9	-12.6
Libertarian	Philip Bender	305	0.70	
Communist	Drew Garvie	139	0.30	-0.10
Independent	Julian Ichim	100	0.20	
Total valid votes		46,610	100.0	

2007 Ontario general election
Party	Candidate	Votes	%
Liberal	Liz Sandals	20,188	40.8
Progressive Conservative	Bob Senechal	12,258	24.7
Green	Ben Polley	9,635	19.5
New Democratic	Karan Mann-Bowers	6,862	13.9
Family Coalition	John Gots	402	0.8
Communist	Drew Garvie	196	0.4

2003 Ontario general election
Party	Candidate	Votes	%	±%
Liberal	Liz Sandals	23,607	42.3	
Progressive Conservative	Brenda Elliott	20,735	37.1	
New Democratic	James Valcke	6,699	12.0	
Green	Ben Polley	3,917	7.0	–
Family Coalition	Alan McDonald	914	1.6	

== See also ==
- List of University of Waterloo people
