= Frank Valeriote =

Canadian politician (born 1954)

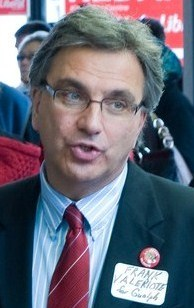

Member of Parliament for Guelph
- In office October 14, 2008 – August 4, 2015
- Preceded by: Brenda Chamberlain
- Succeeded by: Lloyd Longfield

Personal details
- Born: August 15, 1954 (age 71) Guelph, Ontario
- Party: Liberal

Frank Valeriote (born August 15, 1954) is a Canadian lawyer and former politician who served as the member of Parliament for the riding of Guelph from 2008 to 2015 as a member of the Liberal Party. He did not seek re-election in the 2015 federal election and, following the end of his term, he returned to SmithValeriote Law Firm LLP, the law firm he co-founded prior to entering politics.

== Background ==
Valeriote was born August 15, 1954, in Guelph, Ontario. His father, Domenic (Mico) Valeriote, was an accomplished long distance runner and one of the longest-serving members of Guelph City Council. He earned an undergraduate degree in history and economics from the University of Western Ontario before earning his law degree from the University of Ottawa. He was called to the bar in 1981 and returned to Guelph to co-found the law firm of SmithValeriote LLP, where he served as a senior partner until his election.

He served on the local Catholic School Board for 18 years including several as chair. He also served as a member of the Guelph and Wellington Housing Authority for nine years.

In 2001, Valeriote married Catherine Berry, a psychotherapist and counsellor in 2001. They have two children. The couple separated in 2013.

== Political career ==
Valeriote entered federal politics as the Liberal candidate for the 2008 Guelph by-election, which was triggered by the resignation of Brenda Chamberlain. However, the by-election was cancelled when 2015 Canadian federal election was called and Valeriote ran in the general election instead. He won the seat, narrowly defeating Conservative candidate and longtime city councillor Gloria Kovach by fewer than 1,800 votes.

Valeriote was re-elected in the 2011 election. Following the campaign, Valeriote’s Liberal riding association was fined by the Canadian Radio-television and Telecommunications Commission (CRTC) for violating rules related to unsolicited telecommunications. The penalty stemmed from a robocall sent on April 30, 2011, which anonymously criticized his Conservative opponent's position on abortion without identifying its source or providing contact information. Valeriote acknowledged that the call originated from his campaign and described it as a response to an issue raised during the campaign, not an attempt to suppress votes. The CRTC issued a fine of $4,900 as part of a settlement.

On November 13, 2014, Valeriote announced that he would not seek re-election. At the time of that announcement, Valeriote was the Liberal critic for veterans affairs, and the vice chair of the standing committee on veterans affairs. He endorsed the new Liberal candidate, Lloyd Longfield who went on to win the riding by a wide margin in the 2015 election.

In an interview with the Guelph Mercury in November 2014, he attributed his departure to his desire to spend more time with his two young children. "I feel it is important in a meaningful way to be there for their millionth step as they enter their teenage years as it was to see their first step." In a later interview, he confirmed his plan to return to legal practice, "I'm physically, emotionally, and psychologically preparing for the move from member of parliament to an active lawyer at Smith Valeriote." On October 26, 2015, Valeriote returned to SmithValeriote Law Firm LLP, where he had worked as a senior partner until his election as a member of Parliament.

== Electoral record ==
2011 Canadian federal election: Guelph
Party	Candidate	Votes	%	±%	Expenditures
Liberal	Frank Valeriote	25,574	43.37	+11.15	$94,243.98
Conservative	Marty Burke	19,252	32.65	+3.47	$87,361.60
New Democratic	Bobbi Stewart	9,836	16.68	+0.19	$12,588.72
Green	John Lawson	3,711	6.29	-14.86	$47,019.22
Libertarian	Phillip Bender	192	0.32	+0.05	none listed
Marijuana	Kornelis Klevering	171	0.29	+0.01	none listed
Animal Alliance	Karen Levenson	123	0.20	+0.08	none listed
Communist	Drew Garvie	104	0.17	+0.04	–
Total valid votes/expenditure limit		59,021	100.00	$95,043.06	
Total rejected ballots		260	0.44	+0.12	
Turnout		58,963	64.48	-0.11	
Electors on the lists		91,062	–		

2008 Canadian federal election: Guelph
Party	Candidate	Votes	%	±%	Expenditures
Liberal	Frank Valeriote	18,974	32.22	−6.17	$87,844
Conservative	Gloria Kovach	17,186	29.18	−0.58	$63,415
Green	Mike Nagy	12,454	21.15	+12.43	$76,344
New Democratic	Tom King	9,713	16.49	−5.51	$60,470
Marijuana	Kornelis Klevering	166	0.28	–	none listed
Libertarian	Philip Bender	159	0.27	–	$0.00
Communist	Drew Garvie	77	0.13	−0.05	$374
Animal Alliance	Karen Levenson	73	0.12	—	$5,039
Independent	John Turmel	58	0.10	–	none listed
Marxist–Leninist	Manuel Couto	29	0.05	−0.02	none listed
Total valid votes/expense limit		58,889	100.00		
Total rejected ballots		191	0.32	−0.03	
Turnout		59,080	64.59	−6.17	
Electors on the lists		91,463			
