= Guelph (federal electoral district) =

Federal electoral district in Ontario, Canada

Coordinates: 43°33′N 80°15′W

Ontario electoral district
- Interactive map of riding boundaries from the 2025 federal election

Federal electoral district
- Legislature: House of Commons
MP
Dominique O'Rourke
Liberal
- District created: 1976
- First contested: 1979
- Last contested: 2021
- District webpage: profile, map

Demographics
- Population (2011): 121,688
- Electors (2015): 94,632
- Area (km²): 87.15
- Pop. density (per km²): 1,396.3
- Census division: Wellington
- Census subdivision: Guelph

Guelph (formerly Guelph—Wellington) is a federal electoral district in Ontario, Canada, that has been represented in the House of Commons of Canada since 1979. This riding has had a Liberal MP since 1993.

From 2008 until his decision not to run in 2015, the riding's parliamentary seat was held by Liberal MP Frank Valeriote. Valeriote had announced his intention to retire on November 15, 2014. The Liberal candidate in the 2015 federal election in the riding was Lloyd Longfield, who previously served as president of the Guelph Chamber of Commerce. Longfield was first elected on October 19, 2015 and reelected on October 21, 2019.

== History ==
Guelph riding was created in 1976 from parts of Halton—Wentworth, Wellington and Wellington—Grey ridings. It consisted initially of the Townships of Eramosa, Guelph, Pilkington and Puslinch and the City of Guelph in the County of Wellington.

The electoral district was abolished in 1987 when it was merged into Guelph—Wellington riding, adding Erin to the existing boundaries. In 1996, Erin and Pilkington was removed from the riding.

In 2003, a new riding of Guelph was created again, consisting solely of the City of Guelph.

This riding gained a fraction of territory from Wellington—Halton Hills during the 2012 electoral redistribution.

A so-called "robocall" or voter suppression scandal occurred in this riding during the 2011 federal election, when hundreds of Guelph voters who were opposition supporters received automated calls, or 'robocalls', claiming to be from Elections Canada on election day, May 2, 2011. These calls directed them to the wrong polling stations. While reports of such calls were also alleged in five other ridings, later described as election fraud by a Federal Court judge, there was insufficient evidence to support charges in those ridings. The "robocall" incidents were referred to as the "Pierre Poutine" scandal because a cellphone in the affair was registered to a fictitious Pierre Poutine of Separatist Street in Joliette, Quebec.

On June 2, 2014, Michael Sona, the former director of communications for the Conservative candidate in Guelph was charged with "wilfully preventing or endeavouring to prevent an elector from voting". Sona was found guilty on November 14, 2014 and was sentenced to nine months in jail plus twelve months of probation. During the trial, Justice Hearn agreed with the Crown prosecutor's allegation that Sona had likely not acted alone. Sona was released from the Maplehurst Correctional Complex on December 1, 2014, on bail after serving twelve days, pending his appeal of the sentence. He did not appeal the conviction.

Based on another incident during the 2011 federal election campaign, Liberal MP Frank Valeriote’s riding association was fined by the Canadian Radio-television and Telecommunications Commission for violations of the Unsolicited Telecommunications Rules. As reported by the National Post, this fine was based on a robocall message that anonymously attacked the Conservative opponent's position on abortion. The call failed to identify its originator and did not give a callback number. Under a settlement agreement with Valeriote, the CRTC assessed a CA$4,900 fine.

Following the 2022 Canadian federal electoral redistribution, the riding will lose the neighbourhoods of University Village, Kortright Hills, Clairfields and Westminster to the new riding of Wellington—Halton Hills North. This change will come into effect upon the call of the 2025 Canadian federal election.

== Political geography ==
In 2008, the election in Guelph was a four-way one between the NDP, Greens, the Tories and the Liberals, who came out on top. The NDP only won a small handful of polls in the centre part of the city, which was also where the Greens did well. In fact, the Greens dominated the central part of the city. The Tories did well on the fringes of the city, mostly along the northern borders and in the far south of the city. The Liberals won the southern and northern and western parts of the city. In 2011, despite a Conservative majority that saw the Liberals have their worst result ever, they were able to retain the seat by a larger margin as the substantial Green voteshare fell by almost 15 points. In 2015, Liberal voteshare once again rose, to almost 50%. In 2019, the Greens made a major comeback to finish in second ahead of the Conservatives with 26%. However, the Liberals retained the seat with a comfortable 15 point margin.

== Demographics ==
According to the 2021 Canadian census

- Languages: 74.5% English, 1.5% Punjabi, 1.4% Mandarin, 1.3% Italian, 1.2% Spanish, 1.2% Tagalog, 1.2% Vietnamese, 1.1% French
- Religions: 49.7% Christian (23.9% Catholic, 4.1% United Church, 3.9% Anglican, 2.2% Presbyterian, 2.0% Christian Orthodox, 1.1% Baptist, 12.5% Other), 4.5% Muslim, 2.7% Hindu, 1.5% Buddhist, 1.5% Sikh, 38.7% None
- Median income: $44,400 (2020)
- Average income: $55,200 (2020)

Panethnic groups in Guelph (2011−2021)
Panethnic group	2021		2016		2011	
Panethnic group	Pop.	%	Pop.	%	Pop.	%
European (Note: Statistic includes all persons that did not make up part of a visible minority or an indigenous identity.)	103,675	73.1%	103,725	79.74%	99,680	82.68%
South Asian	10,480	7.39%	6,500	5%	4,965	4.12%
Southeast Asian (Note: Statistic includes total responses of "Filipino" and "Southeast Asian" under visible minority section on census.)	6,995	4.93%	5,285	4.06%	4,855	4.03%
African	5,940	4.19%	2,890	2.22%	1,695	1.41%
East Asian (Note: Statistic includes total responses of "Chinese", "Korean", and "Japanese" under visible minority section on census.)	4,860	3.43%	4,710	3.62%	3,775	3.13%
Middle Eastern (Note: Statistic includes total responses of "West Asian" and "Arab" under visible minority section on census.)	3,620	2.55%	2,290	1.76%	1,615	1.34%
Indigenous	2,220	1.57%	1,910	1.47%	1,955	1.62%
Latin American	2,015	1.42%	1,345	1.03%	1,155	0.96%
Other/multiracial (Note: Statistic includes total responses of "Visible minority, n.i.e." and "Multiple visible minorities" under visible minority section on census.)	2,045	1.44%	1,435	1.1%	860	0.71%
Total responses	141,835	98.67%	130,085	98.7%	120,555	99.07%
Total population	143,740	100%	131,794	100%	121,688	100%
Notes: Totals greater than 100% due to multiple origin responses. Demographics based on 2012 Canadian federal electoral redistribution riding boundaries.

=== 2023 representation ===
According to the 2021 Canadian census

Languages: 78.9% English, 1.7% French, 1.4% Italian, 1.3% Tagalog, 1.3% Vietnamese, 1.2% Spanish, 1.1% Punjabi, 1.1% Tigrigna
Race: 75.0% White, 6.2% South Asian, 4.4% Black, 2.8% Filipino, 2.4% Southeast Asian, 2.2% Chinese, 1.8% Indigenous, 1.3% Latin American, 1.2% West Asian, 1.0% Arab
Religions: 49.9% Christian (23.5% Catholic, 4.2% United Church, 4.0% Anglican, 2.3% Presbyterian, 2.1% Christian Orthodox, 1.1% Baptist, 12.7% other), 3.9% Muslim, 2.4% Hindu, 1.5% Buddhist, 1.2% Sikh, 39.7% none
Median income: $43,600 (2020)
Average income: $53,550 (2020)

== Members of Parliament ==
This riding has elected the following members of the Canadian House of Commons:

Parliament	Years	Member	Party
Guelph; Riding created from Halton—Wentworth, Wellington and Wellington—Grey
31st	1979–1980	Albert Fish	Progressive Conservative
32nd	1980–1984	James Schroder	Liberal
33rd	1984–1988	William Winegard	Progressive Conservative
Guelph—Wellington
34th	1988–1993	William Winegard	Progressive Conservative
35th	1993–1997	Brenda Chamberlain	Liberal
36th	1997–2000	Brenda Chamberlain	Liberal
37th	2000–2004	Brenda Chamberlain	Liberal
Guelph
38th	2004–2006	Brenda Chamberlain	Liberal
39th	2006–2008	Brenda Chamberlain	Liberal
40th	2008–2011	Frank Valeriote	Liberal
41st	2011–2015	Frank Valeriote	Liberal
42nd	2015–2019	Lloyd Longfield	Liberal
43rd	2019–2021	Lloyd Longfield	Liberal
44th	2021–2025	Lloyd Longfield	Liberal
45th	2025–present	Dominique O'Rourke	Liberal

== Election results ==
View source data.
Graph of election results in Guelph/Guelph—Wellington (minor parties that never got 2% of the vote or didn't run consistently are omitted)

=== 2025 ===
2025 Canadian federal election
Party	Candidate	Votes	%	±%	Expenditures
Liberal	Dominique O'Rourke	36,406	54.67	+13.30	$113,514.97
Conservative	Gurvir Khaira	20,470	30.74	+7.29	$103,498.99
Green	Anne-Marie Zajdlik	6,779	10.18	+2.33	$117,951.99
New Democratic	Janice Folk-Dawson	2,129	3.20	–18.82	$22,995.73
People's	Jeffrey Swackhammer	498	0.75	–3.91	none listed
Marxist–Leninist	Elaine Baetz	132	0.20	N/A	$0.00
Independent	Michael Wassilyn	117	0.8	N/A	$1,139.11
Canadian Future	Yurii Yavorskyi	62	0.09	N/A	$17.25
Total valid votes/expense limit		66,593	99.44	—	$137,921.14
Total rejected ballots		375	0.56		
Turnout		66,968	72.83	+6.43	
Eligible voters		91,946			
Liberal notional hold		Swing		+3.01	
Source: Elections Canada

=== 2021 ===
2021 federal election redistributed results
Party	Vote	%
Liberal	23,882	41.37
Conservative	13,536	23.45
New Democratic	12,712	22.02
Green	4,530	7.85
People's	2,692	4.66
Others	381	0.66

2021 Canadian federal election
Party	Candidate	Votes	%	±%	Expenditures
Liberal	Lloyd Longfield	29,382	42.10	+1.74	$69,585.36
Conservative	Ashish Sachan	16,795	24.07	+4.79	$9,009.95
New Democratic	Aisha Jahangir	14,713	21.09	+8.79	$37,654.74
Green	Michelle Bowman	5,250	7.52	-17.94	$48,178.88
People's	Joshua Leier	3,182	4.56	+3.12	$6,430.47
Animal Protection	Karen Levenson	262	0.38	New	$8,444.49
Communist	Tristan Dineen	187	0.27	+0.05	$0.00
Total valid votes		69,771	100.00		
Total rejected ballots		434	0.62		
Turnout		70,205	66.38		
Eligible voters		105,863			
Source: Elections Canada

=== 2019 ===
2019 Canadian federal election
Party	Candidate	Votes	%	±%	Expenditures
Liberal	Lloyd Longfield	30,497	40.36	-8.74	$108,379.67
Green	Steve Dyck	19,236	25.46	+14.14	$99,922.31
Conservative	Ashish Sachan	14,568	19.28	-7.07	$66,688.03
New Democratic	Aisha Jahangir	9,297	12.30	+0.29	$24,447.54
People's	Mark Paralovos	1,087	1.44	-	$1,793.83
Christian Heritage	Gordon Truscott	498	0.66	-	$39,351.25
Communist	Juanita Burnett	166	0.22	+0.01	none listed
Independent	Michael Wassilyn	133	0.18	-	none listed
Independent	Kornelis Klevering	86	0.11	-	none listed
Total valid votes/expense limit		75,568	100.0		$127,407.04
Total rejected ballots		452			
Turnout		76,020	72.33%		
Eligible voters		105,106			
Liberal hold		Swing		-11.44	
Source: Elections Canada

=== 2015 ===
2015 Canadian federal election
Party	Candidate	Votes	%	±%	Expenditures
Liberal	Lloyd Longfield	34,303	49.10	+5.80	$213,387.97
Conservative	Gloria Kovach	18,407	26.35	-6.52	$59,899.61
New Democratic	Andrew Seagram	8,392	12.01	-4.72	$42,701.14
Green	Gord Miller	7,909	11.32	+5.19	$222,034.20
Libertarian	Alex Fekri	520	0.74		$40.20
Marijuana	Kornelis Klevering	193	0.28		–
Communist	Tristan Dineen	144	0.21		–
Total valid votes/expense limit		69,868	100.00		$239,632.86
Total rejected ballots		298	0.42	–	
Turnout		70,166	73.27	–	
Eligible voters		95,761			
Liberal hold		Swing		+6.16	
Source: Elections Canada

2011 federal election redistributed results
Party	Vote	%
Liberal	25,643	43.30
Conservative	19,460	32.86
New Democratic	9,906	16.73
Green	3,628	6.13
Others	583	0.98

=== 2011 ===
2011 Canadian federal election
Party	Candidate	Votes	%	±%	Expenditures
Liberal	Frank Valeriote	25,574	43.37	+11.15	$94,243.98
Conservative	Marty Burke	19,252	32.65	+3.47	$87,361.60
New Democratic	Bobbi Stewart	9,836	16.68	+0.19	$12,588.72
Green	John Lawson	3,711	6.29	-14.86	$47,019.22
Libertarian	Phillip Bender	192	0.32	+0.05	none listed
Marijuana	Kornelis Klevering	171	0.29	+0.01	none listed
Animal Alliance	Karen Levenson	123	0.20	+0.08	none listed
Communist	Drew Garvie	104	0.17	+0.04	–
Total valid votes/expenditure limit		59,021	100.00	$95,043.06	
Total rejected ballots		260	0.44	+0.12	
Turnout		58,963	64.48	-0.11	
Electors on the lists		91,062	–		

=== 2008 ===
The call for a federal election to be held on October 14, 2008 occurred when Guelph was already in the throes of a by-election scheduled for September 8, which was intended to replace retiring Liberal MP Brenda Chamberlain. As a result of this, the by-election was cancelled, and the four major candidates running opted to represent their parties again in the federal election. They included: Frank Valeriote, a local lawyer with thorough community experience who had garnered the Liberal nomination in an upset over Marva Wisdom; Gloria Kovach, a popular city councillor and former President of the Federation of Canadian Municipalities who was controversially handed the Conservative nomination after incumbent nominee Brent Barr was ousted; Tom King, a renowned author and Native rights activist who received several high-profile endorsements after his NDP nomination; and Mike Nagy, a long-time Green Party spokesperson.

Initially in Guelph, optimism ran high that either the NDP, Green Party, or Conservative Party could procure the seat, as many felt that the nominees might benefit from the relative unpopularity of Stéphane Dion's Liberals and the gaffes made by prior Liberal MP Brenda Chamberlain, who had failed to show up to a number of Parliamentary votes and retired before the end of her term in office. Ultimately, however, Frank Valeriote was able to narrowly garner the seat over star candidate Gloria Kovach, who lost by around three percent and decreased the margin of defeat for her party. Noteworthy, too, was the increase in the electoral returns of the Green Party, who managed to fare better than the federal NDP in Guelph for the first time, finishing with twenty-one percent of the vote – almost three times what they had received in the 2006 election. In terms of distance from winning position, Guelph was the Green Party's best result in the country in 2008.

2008 Canadian federal election
Party	Candidate	Votes	%	±%	Expenditures
Liberal	Frank Valeriote	18,974	32.22	−6.17	$87,844
Conservative	Gloria Kovach	17,186	29.18	−0.58	$63,415
Green	Mike Nagy	12,454	21.15	+12.43	$76,344
New Democratic	Tom King	9,713	16.49	−5.51	$60,470
Marijuana	Kornelis Klevering	166	0.28	–	none listed
Libertarian	Philip Bender	159	0.27	–	$0.00
Communist	Drew Garvie	77	0.13	−0.05	$374
Animal Alliance	Karen Levenson	73	0.12	—	$5,039
Independent	John Turmel	58	0.10	–	none listed
Marxist–Leninist	Manuel Couto	29	0.05	−0.02	none listed
Total valid votes/expense limit		58,889	100.00		
Total rejected ballots		191	0.32	−0.03	
Turnout		59,080	64.59	−6.17	
Electors on the lists		91,463			

=== 2006 ===
2006 Canadian federal election
Party	Candidate	Votes	%	±%	Expenditures
Liberal	Brenda Chamberlain	23,662	38.39	−6.22	$56,158
Conservative	Brent Barr	18,342	29.76	+3.65	$80,104
New Democratic	Phil Allt	13,561	22.00	+1.97	$30,173
Green	Mike Nagy	5,376	8.72	+1.37	$27,621
Christian Heritage	Peter Ellis	538	0.87	−0.33	$4,880
Communist	Scott Gilbert	111	0.18	–	$280
Marxist–Leninist	Manuel Couto	45	0.07	−0.05	none listed
Total valid votes/expense limit		61,635	100.00		
Total rejected ballots		215	0.35	−0.22	
Turnout		61,850	70.76	+6.58	
Electors on the lists		87,410			
Sources: Official Results, Elections Canada and Financial Returns, Elections Canada.

=== 2004 ===
2004 Canadian federal election
Party	Candidate	Votes	%	±%	Expenditures
Liberal	Brenda Chamberlain	23,442	44.61	−3.58	$60,734
Conservative	Jon Dearden	13,721	26.11	−12.57	$61,179
New Democratic	Phil Allt	10,527	20.03	+9.67	$27,613
Green	Mike Nagy	3,866	7.36	+5.60	$15,304
Christian Heritage	Peter Ellis	634	1.21	+0.71	$5,059
Marijuana	Lyne Rivard	291	0.55	–	none listed
Marxist–Leninist	Manuel Couto	66	0.13	–	none listed
Total valid votes/expense limit		52,547	100.00		
Total rejected ballots		303	0.57	+0.24	
Turnout		52,850	64.18	+3.07	
Electors on the lists		82,346			
Note: Percentage change figures are factored for redistribution. Conservative Party percentages are contrasted with the combined Canadian Alliance and Progressive Conservative percentages from 2000.
Sources: Official Results, Elections Canada and Financial Returns, Elections Canada.

Note: Conservative vote is compared to the total of the Canadian Alliance vote and Progressive Conservative vote in 2000 election.

=== 1988–2003 ===
The riding was part of the riding known as Guelph—Wellington from 1988 to 2003. It was created in 1987 to include parts of Wellington—Dufferin—Simcoe electoral districts.

Guelph—Wellington initially consisted of the City of Guelph, the Village of Erin, and the townships of Eramosa, Erin, Guelph, Pilkington and Puslinch in the County of Wellington.

In 1996, the riding was re-defined to consist of the City of Guelph and the townships of Eramosa, Guelph and Puslinch before being abolished in 2003, and split into the current electoral district and Wellington—Halton Hills electoral district.

2000 Canadian federal election
Party	Candidate	Votes	%	±%	Expenditures
Liberal	Brenda Chamberlain	26,440	48.19	+0.46	$31,978
Alliance	Max Layton	11,037	20.12	+2.83	$51,423
Progressive Conservative	Marie Adsett	10,188	18.57	−2.74	$19,049
New Democratic	Edward Pickersgill	5,685	10.36	−0.05	$26,212
Green	Bill Hulet	966	1.76	+0.64	$201
Christian Heritage	Gord Truscott	275	0.50	−1.35	$3,119
Canadian Action	Sharon Tanti	207	0.38		$3,244
Marxist–Leninist	Manuel Couto	68	0.12	−0.15	$8
Total valid votes		54,866	100.00		
Total rejected ballots		181	0.33	−0.35	
Turnout		55,047	61.11	−5.53	
Electors on the lists		90,076			
Sources: Official Results, Elections Canada and Financial Returns, Elections Canada.

Note: Canadian Alliance vote is compared to the Reform vote in 1997 election.

1997 Canadian federal election
Party	Candidate	Votes	%	±%	Expenditures
Liberal	Brenda Chamberlain	25,004	47.73	+7.70	$37,750
Progressive Conservative	Dick Stewart	11,160	21.31	+0.72	$56,755
Reform	Lyle McNair	9,054	17.28	−6.39	$30,052
New Democratic	Elaine Rogala	5,456	10.42	+5.53	$20,301
Christian Heritage	Peter Ellis	972	1.86		$7,503
Green	Frank Marchetti	589	1.12		$5
Marxist–Leninist	Elaine Couto	146	0.28		$0
Total valid votes		52,381	100.00		
Total rejected ballots		357	0.68	−0.25	
Turnout		52,738	66.64	+0.14	
Electors on the lists		79,141			
Sources: Official Results, Elections Canada and Financial Returns, Elections Canada. Percentage change figures are factored for redistribution.

1993 Canadian federal election
Party	Candidate	Votes	%	Expenditures
Liberal	Brenda Chamberlain	24,359	39.24	$42,976
Reform	Gerry Organ	15,483	24.94	$45,760
Progressive Conservative	Bill Scott	12,825	20.66	$57,999
Non-Affiliated	Frank Maine	3,465	5.58	$29,745
New Democratic Party	Alex Michalos	2,904	4.68	$27,092
National	Maggie Laidlaw	2,018	3.25	$6,098
Green	Simon C. Francis	318	0.51	$0
Natural Law	David W. Mitchell	255	0.41	$12
Libertarian	Tom Bradburn	247	0.40	$0
Canada Party	John H. Long	108	0.17	$600
N/A (Renewal)	Anna Di Carlo	78	0.13	$0
Abolitionist	Andrew Tait	20	0.03	$0
Total valid votes		62,080	100.00	
Total rejected ballots		583	0.93	
Turnout		62,663	67.20	
Electors on the lists		93,250		
Source: Thirty-fifth General Election, 1993: Official Voting Results, Published by the Chief Electoral Officer of Canada. Financial figures taken from official contributions and expenses provided by Elections Canada.

1988 Canadian federal election
Party	Candidate	Votes	%	±%
Progressive Conservative	William Winegard	25,721	43.21	-6.70
Liberal	Frank Gauthier	19,002	31.92	+2.69
New Democratic	Alex Michalos	11,623	19.53	+0.07
Christian Heritage	Peter Ellis	1,978	3.32	
Green	Bill Hulet	581	0.98	
Libertarian	Michael J. Orr	298	0.50	-0.17
Rhinoceros	Marty Williams	240	0.40	-0.33
Independent	Joanne Bruce	80	0.13	
Total valid votes		59,523	100.00	

=== 1979–1984 ===
1984 Canadian federal election
Party	Candidate	Votes	%	±%
Progressive Conservative	William Winegard	23,484	49.91	+12.36
Liberal	Jim Schroder	13,757	29.24	-9.97%
New Democratic	Jim Robinson	9,153	19.45	-2.72
Rhinoceros	Susie Mew Catty	343	0.73	+0.11
Libertarian	Walter A. Tucker	314	0.67	+0.43
Total valid votes		47,051	100.00	

1980 Canadian federal election
Party	Candidate	Votes	%	±%
Liberal	James Schroder	17,268	39.21	+1.74
Progressive Conservative	Albert Fish	16,539	37.55	-4.41
New Democratic	Jim Finamore	9,765	22.17	+2.44
Rhinoceros	Steve Thorning	272	0.62	
Libertarian	Brian Seymour	103	0.23	0.03
Marxist–Leninist	Robert A. Cruise	53	0.12	0.02
Communist	Alan Pickersgill	45	0.10	0.01
Total valid votes		44,045	100.00	
lop.parl.ca

1979 Canadian federal election
Party	Candidate	Votes	%
Progressive Conservative	Albert Fish	18,149	41.96
Liberal	Frank W. Maine	16,203	37.46
New Democratic	Jim Finamore	8,535	19.73
Independent	Joe Barabas	190	0.44
Libertarian	Brian Seymour	90	0.21
Marxist–Leninist	Robert Cruise	45	0.10
Communist	Alan G. Pickersgill	39	0.09
Total valid votes		43,251	100.00

== See also ==
- List of Canadian electoral districts
- Historical federal electoral districts of Canada
