= James Schroder =

Canadian politician

Member of Parliament for Guelph
- In office 1980–1984
- Preceded by: Albert Fish
- Succeeded by: William Winegard

Personal details
- Born: James Duncan Schroder; 27 August 1918 Guelph, Ontario, Canada
- Died: 13 December 2013 (aged 95) Guelph, Ontario, Canada
- Party: Liberal
- Profession: veterinarian

James Duncan Schroder (27 August 1918 – 13 December 2013) was a Canadian Liberal Party politician who served as a member of the House of Commons of Canada. He practised and taught veterinary medicine by career. He was born in Guelph, Ontario.

Schroder graduated from Ontario Veterinary College in 1942. He entered national politics at the Ontario riding of Guelph in the 1980 federal election, serving in the 32nd Canadian Parliament, but lost the seat in the 1984 election to William Winegard of the Progressive Conservative party. He died at his home on 13 December 2013.

== Elections ==
1980 Canadian federal election: Guelph
| Party | Candidate | Votes | % | ±% |
|---|---|---|---|---|
| Liberal | James Schroder | 17,268 | 39.21 | +1.74 |
| Progressive Conservative | Albert Fish | 16,539 | 37.55 | -4.41 |
| New Democratic | Jim Finamore | 9,765 | 22.17 | +2.44 |
| Rhinoceros | Steve Thorning | 272 | 0.62 | |
| Libertarian | Brian Seymour | 103 | 0.23 | 0.03 |
| Marxist–Leninist | Robert A. Cruise | 53 | 0.12 | 0.02 |
| Communist | Alan Pickersgill | 45 | 0.10 | 0.01 |
| Total valid votes | | 44,045 | 100.00 | |
lop.parl.ca
