= Lloyd Longfield =

Canadian politician (born 1956)

Member of Parliament for Guelph
- In office October 19, 2015 – March 23, 2025
- Preceded by: Frank Valeriote
- Succeeded by: Dominique O'Rourke

Personal details
- Born: October 8, 1956 (age 69) Winnipeg, Manitoba, Canada
- Party: Liberal
- Education: University of Manitoba; Red River College Polytechnic

Lloyd Longfield (born October 8, 1956) is a Canadian politician who represented the riding of Guelph in the House of Commons of Canada from 2015 to 2025.

== Early life ==
A native of Winnipeg, Longfield moved to Guelph in 1992. He has a Bachelor of Arts in English and mathematics from the University of Manitoba and a diploma in mechanical engineering from Red River College. Prior to running for federal office, Longfield was the president of the Guelph Chamber of Commerce for about eight years.

== Political career ==
Longfield ran as the Liberal candidate for the riding of Guelph in the 2015 federal election. The riding was previously held by Liberal member of Parliament (MP) Frank Valeriote who had opted not to run for re-election. Longfield was successful in retaining the Guelph seat for the Liberals by a wide margin, earning nearly 50 per cent of the popular vote and finishing more than 15,000 votes ahead of Conservative candidate Gloria Kovach.

After being elected, Longfield promised to vote to increase funding to the CBC and to stop the phase-out of door-to-door mail delivery. The latter was a part of the Liberal platform as described by Justin Trudeau in a September 25, 2015 letter: "we will also stop the Harper Conservatives' plan to end door-to-door mail delivery and ensure Canadians receive the postal service on which they rely."

Longfield was re-elected in the 2019 and 2021 federal elections. On June 28, 2023, he announced that he would finish his term, but would not run in the 45th Canadian federal election.

== Personal life ==
Longfield and his wife, Barbara, have three daughters and four grandchildren.

== Electoral record ==
2021 Canadian federal election: Guelph
Party	Candidate	Votes	%	±%	Expenditures
Liberal	Lloyd Longfield	29,382	42.10	+1.74	$69,585.36
Conservative	Ashish Sachan	16,795	24.07	+4.79	$9,009.95
New Democratic	Aisha Jahangir	14,713	21.09	+8.79	$37,654.74
Green	Michelle Bowman	5,250	7.52	-17.94	$48,178.88
People's	Joshua Leier	3,182	4.56	+3.12	$6,430.47
Animal Protection	Karen Levenson	262	0.38	New	$8,444.49
Communist	Tristan Dineen	187	0.27	+0.05	$0.00
Total valid votes		69,771	100.00		
Total rejected ballots		434	0.62		
Turnout		70,205	66.38		
Eligible voters		105,863			
Source: Elections Canada

2019 Canadian federal election: Guelph
Party	Candidate	Votes	%	±%	Expenditures
Liberal	Lloyd Longfield	30,497	40.36	-8.74	$108,379.67
Green	Steve Dyck	19,236	25.46	+14.14	$99,922.31
Conservative	Ashish Sachan	14,568	19.28	-7.07	$66,688.03
New Democratic	Aisha Jahangir	9,297	12.30	+0.29	$24,447.54
People's	Mark Paralovos	1,087	1.44	-	$1,793.83
Christian Heritage	Gordon Truscott	498	0.66	-	$39,351.25
Communist	Juanita Burnett	166	0.22	+0.01	none listed
Independent	Michael Wassilyn	133	0.18	-	none listed
Independent	Kornelis Klevering	86	0.11	-	none listed
Total valid votes/expense limit		75,568	100.0		$127,407.04
Total rejected ballots		452			
Turnout		76,020	72.33%		
Eligible voters		105,106			
Liberal hold		Swing		-11.44	
Source: Elections Canada

2015 Canadian federal election: Guelph
Party	Candidate	Votes	%	±%
Liberal	Lloyd Longfield	34,303	49.10	+5.80
Conservative	Gloria Kovach	18,407	26.35	-6.52
New Democratic	Andrew Seagram	8,392	12.01	-4.72
Green	Gord Miller	7,909	11.32	+5.19
Libertarian	Alex Fekri	520	0.74	
Marijuana	Kornelis Klevering	193	0.28	
Communist	Tristan Dineen	144	0.21	
Total valid votes		69,868	100.0	
Total rejected ballots		298	0.42	–
Turnout		70,166	71.3	–
Eligible voters		98,453		
Source: Elections Canada
