= Derek Fletcher =

Canadian politician

Ontario MPP
- In office 1990–1995
- Preceded by: Rick Ferraro
- Succeeded by: Brenda Elliott
- Constituency: Guelph

Personal details
- Born: 1951 (age 74–75)
- Party: New Democrat
- Occupation: Press operator

Derek Fletcher (born c. 1951) is a former politician in Ontario, Canada. He was a New Democratic Party member of the Legislative Assembly of Ontario from 1990 to 1995, representing Guelph.

== Background ==
Fletcher was born in England and moved to Canada with has family at the age of six. He worked as a flexographic press operator for sixteen years at Macmillan Bathurst Industries in Guelph, Ontario. He served as president of the Guelph and District Labour Council from 1984 to 1988, and was a school board trustee on the Wellington County Public School Board from 1985 to 1990.

== Politics ==
Fletcher ran for the Ontario legislature in the 1985 provincial election, finishing a distant third in the riding of Wellington South. In the 1987 provincial election, he finished second in the redistributed riding of Guelph. In both cases, the winning candidate was Liberal Rick Ferraro.

The NDP won a majority government in the 1990 provincial election, and Fletcher defeated Ferraro by 3,107 votes in his third run for office. He served as a parliamentary assistant to the Minister of Consumer and Commercial Relations from 1990 to 1993. For the remainder of the term he was parliamentary assistant to the Minister of Citizenship.

The NDP were defeated in the 1995 provincial election, and Fletcher finished third in his bid for re-election. The winning candidate was Brenda Elliott of the Progressive Conservatives.
