= James Gordon (Canadian musician) =

Canadian singer-songwriter

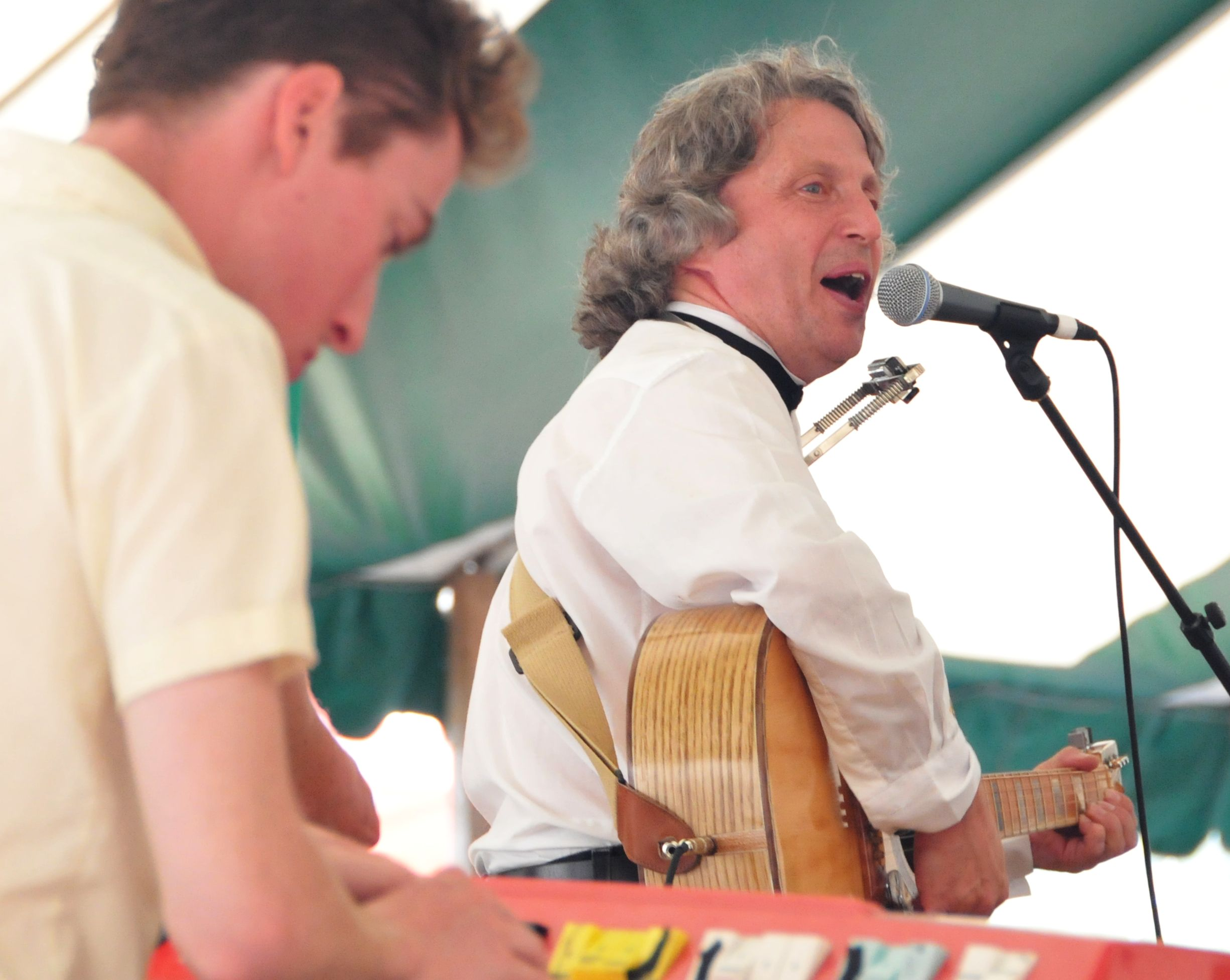
- James Gordon performing at the Hillside Festival, which he co-founded in 1984.
- Occupation: Singer-songwriter
- Known for: Tamarack, "Frobisher Bay", Hillside Festival
- Political party: Ontario New Democratic Party
- Spouse: Val Gordon
- Children: Evan Gordon, Geordie Gordon
- Website: www.jamesgordon.ca

Notes
- Folk Era Records

James Gordon is a Canadian singer-songwriter, known as a founding member of Tamarack. He has also released more than 20 solo albums.

== Musical career ==
As a prolific songwriter, James Gordon is known for such diverse songs as "Sweaters for Penguins" and "Frobisher Bay". He wrote the weekly song for the CBC Radio program Basic Black. He is proficient on a variety of instruments including guitar, piano, banjo and mandola. His songs have been covered by other musical artists such as the Cowboy Junkies ("Mining for Gold") and Melanie Doane.

He has toured internationally in North America, the British Isles, Southeast Asia, and Cuba.

He is a co-founder of Guelph's annual Hillside Festival and was its first creative director, from 1985 to 1988. He also founded (and was the artistic director of) the Canadian Songwriters' Festival, and was a board member of the Ontario Council of Folk Festivals. Gordon is active in arts-, civics-, and environment-related causes in the Guelph region, for which he was given the Guelph Mayor's Award in 2008.

== Politics ==
=== Provincial ===
He was the candidate for the Ontario New Democratic Party in the riding of Guelph in the 2011 Ontario provincial election but lost to incumbent Liz Sandals. He ran again in 2014 but once again lost to Liz Sandals.

=== Municipal ===
James Gordon declared his candidacy for Ward Two City Councillor in the city of Guelph, Ontario in the 27 October 2014 Guelph municipal election. Gordon was elected to serve alongside Andy Van Hellemond and plans to continue his activist pursuits such as touring his one-man show, "Stephen Harper: The Musical". Gordon was re-elected in 2018 Ontario municipal elections. Gordon announced his retirement from municipal politics in June 2022.

== Discography ==
=== Tamarack ===
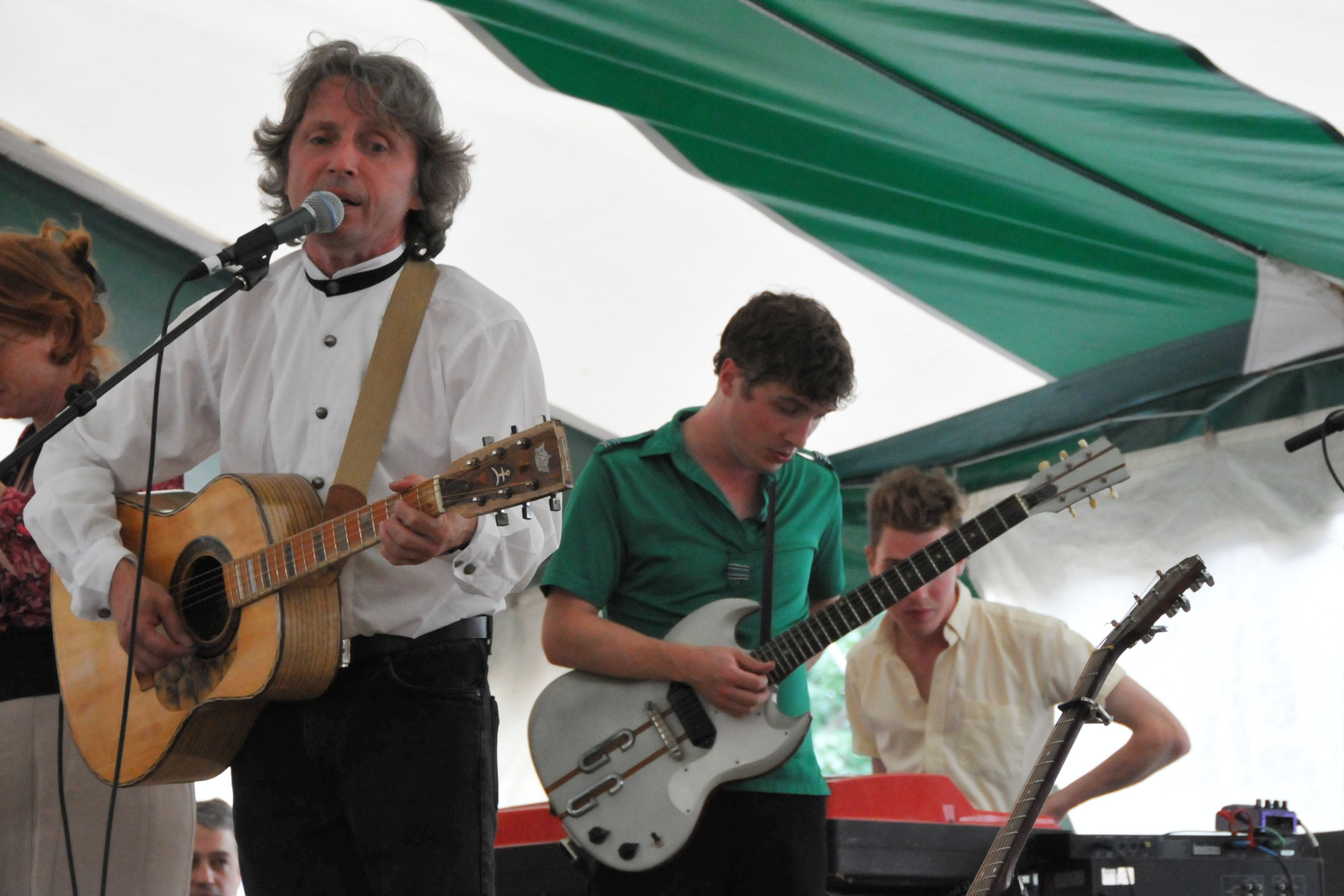
James Gordon performing at Hillside Festival in 2008. His sons, Evan and Geordie, are behind him.

- Au Canada (1980)
- Wind River
- Spirit & Stone
- 13
- Fields of Rock and Snow (1993)
- Frobisher Bay (1993)
- Leaving Inverarden (1995)
- Blankets of Snow (1998)

=== Solo recordings ===
- Looking for Livingstone (1987)
- Farther Along (1991)
- Hometown Tunes (1994)
- Dim Lights, Small City (1995)
- More Hometown Tunes (1997)
- Pipe Street Dreams (1999)
- Mining for Gold: Twenty Years of Songwriting (2002)
- Tune Cooties (2002)
- Out on a Rural Ramble (2002)
- One Timeless Moment (2003)
- Endomusia (2004), includes "Weapons of Mass Instruction"
- Nine Green Bottles (2007), includes "Casey Sheehan Didn't Die for Nothing", credited to James Gordon and Sons
- My Stars Your Eyes (2009)
- Coyote's Calling (2013), includes "Jack's Dream"
- Sunny Jim (2016) includes “This Canoe Runs on Water” & “I’m Just A Farmhouse” (SOCAN).
- Heritage Hall Sessions (2020)
- Crybabies Caravan viral single with 300,000 views 2022
- When I Stayed Home (2022)
- Wrinkles and Scars (2024)
- Songs from "Smashing the Oligarchy" (2025)

=== Folk operas (musicals) ===
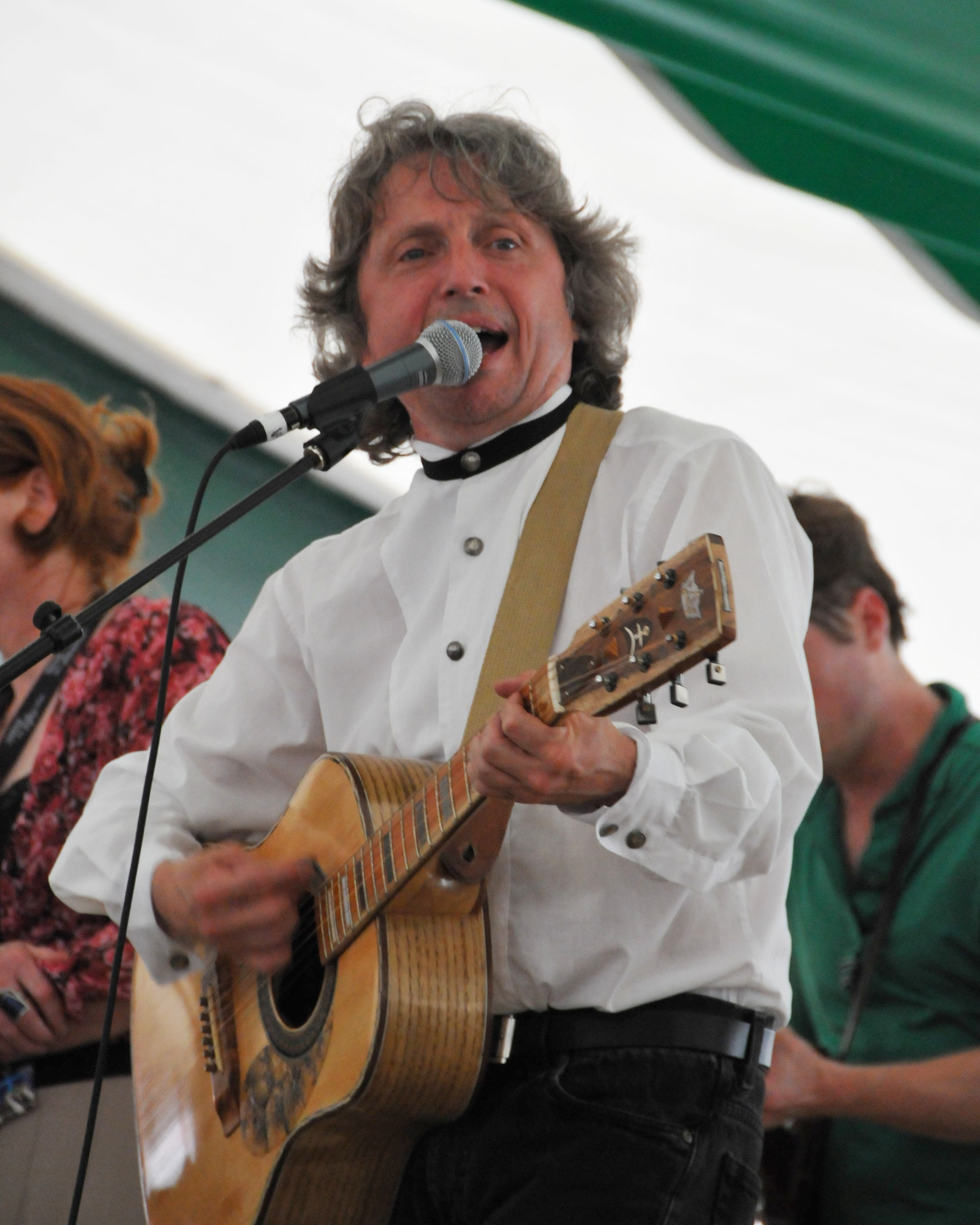
James Gordon performing at Hillside Festival in 2008.

James Gordon used to perform with David Archibald as "Jim and Dave", producing family-oriented musicals.

- Jim and Dave's Awesome Environmental Adventure (1990)
- Jim and Dave's Awesome Search for the Golden Toad (1992)
- Jim and Dave's Awesome Supernatural Camping Adventure (1993)

More recently, his work includes:

- Hardscrabble Road (2003)
- Two Steps and a Glass of Water (2005), which deals with mental illness and health, also a film by Glenn Curtis
- Tryst and Snout (2007)
- Stephen Harper: The Musical (2013)
- Smashing the Oligarchy (2025)

== Cinema ==
- "Mining for Gold" on the soundtrack of the film Silver City (2004)
- Two Steps and a Glass of Water

== Electoral record ==
2018 Guelph Municipal Election: Ward 2
| Candidate | Vote | % |
|---|---|---|
| James Gordon (X) | 3,009 | 30.59 |
| Rodrigo Goller | 2,728 | 27.74 |
| Jonathan Knowles | 1,591 | 16.18 |
| Dorothe Fair | 1,341 | 13.63 |
| Mary Thring | 996 | 10.13 |
| Sudha Sharma | 170 | 1.73 |

2014 Guelph municipal election: Ward 2
| Candidate | Votes | % | Δ% | Expenditures (Note: includes expenses not subject to spending limit) |
|---|---|---|---|---|
| Andy Van Hellemond (X) | 3,266 | 27.50 | -1.56 | $2,012.04 |
| James Gordon | 2,990 | 25.17 | – | $5,450.18 |
| Ray Ferraro | 2,615 | 22.02 | +0.80 | $2,458.07 |
| Martin Collier | 1,314 | 11.06 | – | $3,662.99 |
| Sian Matwey | 1,109 | 9.34 | – | none listed |
| Chris Keleher Sr. | 583 | 4.91 | – | $270.13 |
| Mark Paralovos (withdrawn) (Note: withdrew nomination 4 September) | – | – | – | $100.00 |
| Total valid votes/Expense Limit | 11,877 | 100.0 | | $16,446.10 |
| Turnout | 6,846 | 48.50 | | |
| Eligible voters | 14,116 | | | |
Sources: 2014 Official Election Results, City of Guelph, 2014 Election – Ward 2, City of Guelph, and Voter Statistics, City of Guelph

2014 Ontario general election: Guelph
| Party | Candidate | Votes | % | ±% |
|---|---|---|---|---|
| Liberal | Liz Sandals | 22,014 | 41.52 | -0.91 |
| Progressive Conservative | Anthony MacDonald | 11,048 | 20.84 | -4.76 |
| Green | Mike Schreiner | 10,230 | 19.29 | +12.36 |
| New Democratic | James Gordon | 9,385 | 17.70 | -6.18 |
| Communist | Juanita Burnett | 178 | 0.34 | +0.04 |
| Libertarian | Blair Smythe | 170 | 0.32 | -0.33 |
| Total valid votes | | 53,025 | 100.00 | |
| Liberal hold | | Swing | | +1.92 |
Source: Elections Ontario

2011 Ontario general election: Guelph
| Party | Candidate | Votes | % | ±% |
|---|---|---|---|---|
| Liberal | Liz Sandals | 19,815 | 42.43 | +1.68 |
| Progressive Conservative | Greg Schirk | 11,954 | 25.60 | +0.86 |
| New Democratic | James Gordon | 11,150 | 23.88 | +10.03 |
| Green | Steve Dyck | 3,234 | 6.93 | -12.52 |
| Libertarian | Philip Bender | 305 | 0.65 | |
| Communist | Drew Garvie | 139 | 0.30 | -0.1 |
| Independent | Julian Ichim | 100 | 0.21 | |
| Total valid votes | | 46,697 | 99.56 | |
| Total rejected, unmarked and declined ballots | | 206 | 0.44 | |
| Turnout | | 46,903 | 50.27 | |
| Eligible voters | | 93,308 | | |
| Liberal hold | | Swing | | +0.41 |
Source: Elections Ontario
