= Frozen in Frobisher Bay =

"Frobisher Bay"

Song by Tamarack

from the album Frobisher Bay
- Published: SBG Publishing, SOCAN 1990
- Released: 1993
- Recorded: Ty Tyrfu, Guelph, Ontario, Canada
- Genre: Folk
- Length: 3:34
- Label: Folk Era
- Songwriter: James Gordon
- Producers: Jeff Bird, assisted by Pat Mooney

"Frobisher Bay," also known as "Frozen in Frobisher Bay," is a song by James Gordon about whaling in the Canadian Arctic. It has been recorded by many artists around the English-speaking world and was used as an audition song on Canadian Idol.

== Recordings ==
- Tamarack, Frobisher Bay (1993)
- Tamarack, Blankets of Snow (1998)
- Hilary Spencer, Afterimage (2001)
- James Gordon, Mining for Gold (2002)
- Bach Children's Chorus of Toronto, Go Where You Will (2004)
- Kimber's Men, Don't Take the Heroes (2006)
