= William Winegard =

Canadian politician

The Honourable William Winegard PC OC

Member of the Canadian Parliament for Guelph—Wellington
- In office November 21, 1988 – October 25, 1993
- Preceded by: Riding Established
- Succeeded by: Brenda Chamberlain

Member of the Canadian Parliament for Guelph
- In office September 4, 1984 – November 21, 1988
- Preceded by: James Schroder
- Succeeded by: District abolished in 1987

Personal details
- Born: William Charles Winegard; September 17, 1924 Hamilton, Ontario, Canada
- Died: January 31, 2019 (aged 94)
- Party: Progressive Conservative
- Cabinet: Minister for Science (1990-1993); Minister of State (Science and Technology) (1989-1990)
- Committees: Chair, Standing Committee on External Affairs and International Trade (1984-1986); Chair, Standing Committee on External Affairs and National Defence (1984-1986)
- Portfolio: Parliamentary Secretary to the Minister for International Trade (1988-1989)

William Charles Winegard, PC OC (September 17, 1924 – January 31, 2019) was a Canadian educator, engineer, scientist and member of Parliament.

== Life and career ==
Born in Hamilton, Ontario, he served during World War II in the Royal Canadian Navy from 1942 to 1945, becoming the youngest officer in the history of the Canadian Navy. His father William Winegard was a veteran of both world wars, the first mayor of Caledonia, Ontario and the founder of Winegard Motors (Caledonia). In 1952, William received his doctorate in metallurgical engineering from the University of Toronto and he taught there until 1967. From 1967 to 1975, he was President and Vice-Chancellor of the University of Guelph. In 1980, he was made a Fellow of the American Society for Metals (ASM).

He was elected as a Progressive Conservative Party candidate in the riding of Guelph in the 1984 federal election. He was re-elected in the 1988 election in the riding of Guelph—Wellington. He was the Parliamentary Secretary to the Minister for International Trade from 1988 to 1989, the Minister of State (Science and Technology) from 1989 to 1990, and the Minister for Science from 1990 to 1993.

In 1998, he was made an Officer of the Order of Canada.

He married Elizabeth Latham Jaques (b. Morpeth/Moraviantown, Ontario, raised Six Nations Reserve, Ontario) and they had three children, Bill, Charles and Kathryn. He resided in Guelph, Ontario and was active in many charitable organizations.

He and several other community activists, formed a group they call the Old Man's Club, and they want the site of the former Guelph Correctional Centre to remain green and are opposed to development on that land. He was also against the Ontario Liberal Government's decision to close the Guelph Pacemaker Clinic, forcing about 2,000 Guelphites, mainly seniors, to go to Kitchener for treatment.

On November 11, 2014, he spoke at the Remembrance Day service in Guelph, in which he criticized the Harper Government for its handling of Canadian Veterans.

In the Spring of 2014, the Upper Grand District School Board had named a new public school in the east end of Guelph after him. William C. Winegard Public School opened in September for the 2015 school year and has since have had Winegard make numerous honourable appearances for various events.

He died on January 31, 2019, at the age of 94.

== Electoral record ==
1988 Canadian federal election: Guelph—Wellington
Party	Candidate	Votes	%	±%
Progressive Conservative	William Winegard	25,721	43.21	-6.70
Liberal	Frank Gauthier	19,002	31.92	+2.69
New Democratic	Alex Michalos	11,623	19.53	+0.07
Christian Heritage	Peter Ellis	1,978	3.32	
Green	Bill Hulet	581	0.98	
Libertarian	Michael J. Orr	298	0.50	-0.17
Rhinoceros	Marty Williams	240	0.40	-0.33
Independent	Joanne Bruce	80	0.13	
Total valid votes		59,523	100.00	

1984 Canadian federal election: Guelph
Party	Candidate	Votes	%	±%
Progressive Conservative	William Winegard	23,484	49.91	+12.36
Liberal	Jim Schroder	13,757	29.24	-9.97%
New Democratic	Jim Robinson	9,153	19.45	-2.72
Rhinoceros	Susie Mew Catty	343	0.73	+0.11
Libertarian	Walter A. Tucker	314	0.67	+0.43
Total valid votes		47,051	100.00	

Political offices
Preceded by Frank Oberle	Minister of State (Science and Technology); 1989–1990	Succeeded by The office was abolished.
Preceded by The office was created.	Minister for Science; 1990–1993	Succeeded by Thomas Hockin
