= Mary Anne Chambers =

Canadian politician

The Honourable Mary Anne Chambers ECO OOnt

Ontario MPP
- In office 2003–2007
- Preceded by: Steve Gilchrist
- Succeeded by: Riding abolished
- Constituency: Scarborough East

Personal details
- Born: September 8, 1950 (age 75) Jamaica
- Party: Liberal
- Education: University of Toronto (BA)
- Occupation: Banker

Mary Anne Veronica Chambers, OOnt (born September 8, 1950) is a former politician in Ontario, Canada, and was named Chancellor of the University of Guelph in September 2022. She was a member of the Legislative Assembly of Ontario from 2003 until 2007, and served in the cabinet in the government of Premier Dalton McGuinty.

== Background ==
Chambers was born in Jamaica, and emigrated to Canada in 1976. She is a graduate of The Immaculate Conception High School. She was a banker prior to entering political life. She joined Scotiabank in 1976, and was involved in the expansion of computer and electronic services within the organisation. She was also involved in a number of task forces concerning the role of women in the workplace. In 1988, she received a Bachelor of Arts degree from the Scarborough campus of the University of Toronto with a major in Commerce.

Chambers was named a Senior Vice-President of the bank in 1998, retiring from the position in December 2002. She is also a former director of Grace, Kennedy (Ontario) Ltd. and Grace Foods International Ltd., prominent food distribution companies belonging to a parent organization in Jamaica.

Chambers was a member of the Rouge Valley Health System, serving as Vice-Chair for a time. She was a member of the Governing Council of the University of Toronto from 1993 to 2001, and Vice-Chair of the Governing Council from 1998 to 2001. She helped to author a University policy that no student would be prevented from studying at Toronto for inadequate financial resources.

Chambers was also a member of the Board of Trustees of the United Way of Greater Toronto from 1994 to 2001, and was President of the Canadian Club of Toronto from 1998 to 1999. In 2003, she was awarded the Jamaican Prime Ministers Medal of Appreciation for Service to Jamaica by Jamaican Prime Minister Percival James Patterson, in recognition of her work within Toronto's Jamaican community.

== Politics ==
Chambers was elected to the Legislative Assembly of Ontario in the provincial election of 2003, as a Liberal in the riding of Scarborough East, defeating incumbent Progressive Conservative Steve Gilchrist by over 7000 votes. The Liberals won the provincial election, and Chambers was appointed Minister of Training, Colleges and Universities on October 23, 2003. In early 2004, she reaffirmed her government's election pledge not to raise tuition rates.

Chambers was appointed Ontario Minister of Children and Youth Services in June 2005. On July 11, 2007, she announced that she would not be running for re-election to the Ontario Legislature. In 2015, she was made a member of the Order of Ontario. On May 17, 2015, she spoke in support of the nomination of NDP candidate Adaoma Patterson for Brampton West.

=== Cabinet positions ===
McGuinty ministry, Province of Ontario (2003–2013)
Cabinet posts (2)
Predecessor	Office	Successor
Marie Bountrogianni	Minister of Children and Youth Services; 2005–2007	Deb Matthews
Dianne Cunningham	Minister of Training, Colleges and Universities; 2003–2005	Chris Bentley

=== Electoral record ===
2003 Ontario general election
Party	Candidate	Votes	%	±%
Liberal	Mary Anne Chambers	21,798	51.5	+10.62
Progressive Conservative	Steve Gilchrist	14,323	33.84	-15.66
New Democratic	Gary Dale	5,250	12.4	+5.57
Green	Hugh McNeil	668	+1.58	
Libertarian	Sam Apelbaum	285	0.67	-0.21
