= Donna Cansfield =

Canadian politician

The Honourable Donna Cansfield ECO

Ontario MPP
- In office 2003–2014
- Preceded by: Chris Stockwell
- Succeeded by: Yvan Baker
- Constituency: Etobicoke Centre

Personal details
- Born: 1945 (age 80–81) Alberta, Canada
- Party: Liberal
- Spouse: Bill Cansfield
- Children: 2

Donna H. Cansfield, (born c. 1945) is a former politician in Ontario, Canada. She was a Liberal member in the Legislative Assembly of Ontario from 2003 to 2014 representing the riding of Etobicoke Centre. She served as a cabinet minister in the government of Dalton McGuinty.

== Background ==
Cansfield was born in Alberta in 1945. Prior to entering politics she was a homemaker, raising two children with her husband Bill. They live in central Etobicoke.

== Politics ==
=== School trustee ===
In 1988, Cansfield was elected to the Etobicoke Board of Education. During her tenure she served as president of the Ontario Public School Boards' Association and later as president of the Canadian School Boards Association. She lost this position in 1997 when Ontario withdrew from the national association.

In November 1997 she was elected trustee as a member of the newly amalgamated Toronto District School Board. In December 2001 she was elected by a vote of 12–10 as president of the school board beating her rival Kathleen Wynne. In January 2003 Cansfield agreed to share the board chair position with Shelley Carroll. This came about because the board was deeply split by the province's takeover of the school board in 2002 by superintendent Paul Christie. The province took this action because the board could not balance its budget. The dual chair position was to remain in place until the following election in November 2003. However, Cansfield resigned her position as co-chair four months later in order to focus on her run as a candidate in the 2003 provincial election. She retained her position as trustee.

=== Provincial politics ===
While there was some perception that Cansfield had centre-right or conservative views, she opted to run as the Liberal candidate in the riding of Etobicoke Centre in the 2003 election. Her decision to run for the Liberals rather than the Conservatives may have been driven by her distaste for the way that the Ernie Eves government had dealt with the budget crisis of the Toronto District School Board. She said, "I do not see a light at the end of the tunnel with this government. I'm tired of people not standing up and saying, 'I believe in public education.'" She based her campaign on improvements to the education system and handily beat Conservative rival Rose Andrachuk by 4,460 votes.

Cansfield was appointed Parliamentary Assistant (PA) to Energy Minister Dwight Duncan on 23 October 2003. She was appointed as Minister of Energy on 11 October 2005 when Duncan was named as Minister of Finance. She was reassigned as Minister of Transportation on 23 May 2006, when Duncan returned to Energy.

After the 2007 election, Cansfield became Ontario's Minister of Natural Resources, where she served until 18 January 2010. Premier McGuinty appointed Cansfield as PA to the Minister of Municipal Affairs and Housing after the January 2010 cabinet shuffle.

In 2011, she was appointed as PA to the Minister of Economic Development and Innovation and in 2012 as PA to the Minister of Finance. In February 2013 as part of the Wynne government, she was appointed as chief government whip.

Cansfield left provincial politics after she declined to seek another term in the 2014 Ontario election.

=== Cabinet positions ===
McGuinty ministry, Province of Ontario (2003–2013)
Cabinet posts (3)
Predecessor	Office	Successor
David Ramsay	Minister of Natural Resources; 2007–2010	Linda Jeffrey
Harinder Takhar	Minister of Transportation; 2006–2007	Jim Bradley
Dwight Duncan	Minister of Energy; 2005–2006	Dwight Duncan

== Electoral record ==
2011 Ontario general election
Party	Candidate	Votes	%	±%
Liberal	Donna Cansfield	21,856	51.4	+1.3
Progressive Conservative	Mary Anne De Monte-Whelan	13,952	32.8	-1.3
New Democratic	Ana Maria Rivero	5,099	12.0	+3.61
Green	Cheryll San Juan	836	2.0	-6.39
Libertarian	Alexander Bussmann	422	1.0	
Family Coalition	Liz Millican	232	0.5	
Freedom	Marco Renda	108	0.3	
Total valid votes		42,505	100.00	

2007 Ontario general election
Party	Candidate	Votes	%	±%
Liberal	Donna Cansfield	22,886	50.18	+0.77
Progressive Conservative	Andrew Pringle	15,565	34.13	-5.30
New Democratic	Anita Agrawal	3,828	8.39	+0.78
Green	Greg King	3,330	7.30	+3.75
Total valid votes		45,609	100.00	

2003 Ontario general election
Party	Candidate	Votes	%	±%
Liberal	Donna Cansfield	22,070	49.41	+9.04
Progressive Conservative	Rose Andrachuk	17,610	39.43	-14.69
New Democratic	Margaret Anne Mchugh	3,400	7.61	+4.83
Green	Ralph M. Chapman	1,584	3.55	+2.75
Total valid votes		44,664	100.00	
