= Margarett Best =

Canadian politician

The Honourable Margarett Best ECO

Ontario MPP
- In office 2007–2013
- Preceded by: New riding
- Succeeded by: Mitzie Hunter
- Constituency: Scarborough—Guildwood

Personal details
- Born: May Pen, Jamaica
- Party: Liberal
- Children: 3
- Education: University of Toronto
- Occupation: Lawyer

Margarett R. Best is a former Canadian politician. She was a Liberal member of the Legislative Assembly of Ontario (MPP) from 2007 to 2013 and represented the riding of Scarborough—Guildwood. She was a cabinet minister in the government of Dalton McGuinty.

== Background ==
Best, an African Canadian, was born in Jamaica. She was educated at the Scarborough campus of the University of Toronto, and Osgoode Hall Law School of York University.

She was a member of the Law Society of Upper Canada Solicitor's Examination Blueprint Committee, the Board of the Women's Multicultural Resource and Counselling Centre of Durham, Sheena's Place Breakfast Committee, and the College Compensations and Appointment Council.

== Politics ==
Best was first elected to the Legislative Assembly of Ontario in the 2007 Ontario election. She was appointed Minister of Health Promotion and Sport by Dalton McGuinty.

In 2008, she introduced legislation banning smoking in cars when children were present. The Bill called the Smoke-Free Ontario Amendment Act imposed a fine of $250 for transgressors. She was the lead minister in Ontario's successful bid for the 2015 Pan American Games and the 2015 Parapan American Games.

Best was re-elected in the 2011 election. She was the first African-Canadian woman to be re-elected to the Provincial Legislature in the Province of Ontario. Following the election, she was appointed Minister of Consumer Services.

In her capacity as Minister of Consumer Services, she introduced Bill 82, The Wireless Services Agreements Act, 2012, an act to strengthen consumer protection with respect to consumer agreements relating to wireless services accessed from a cellular phone, smartphone or any other similar mobile device. The bill died when McGuinty prorogued the Ontario Legislature in October 2012. Best also did extensive work on reforming the Condominium Act, including developing the framework for legislative reform of the act and leading the consultation process. She worked on the amendments to the Not for Profit Business Corporations Act and the Delegated Administrative Authorities Act, which was introduced as part of the 2012 budget.

She was a member of the Health Education and Social Policy Committee and the Legislation and Regulation Committee of the 39th and 40th Parliament of Ontario, and she sat on the Poverty Reduction Committee of the 39th Parliament of Ontario.

In February 2013, she was appointed parliamentary assistant to the Minister of Education by the new premier Kathleen Wynne. Her exclusion from Wynne's first cabinet was initially reported as a demotion for political reasons, although it was later revealed that Best had asked to have her duties reduced for undisclosed health reasons.

On June 27, 2013, she announced her resignation as MPP.

=== Awards and recognition ===
In 2006, Best was awarded the African Canadian Achievement Award. She was awarded another African Canadian Achievement Award in 2011 for excellence in politics.

In 2008, she was conferred with an honorary Doctor of Laws degree by the Northern Caribbean University. Best has also received the BBPA Women of Distinction Award and, in October 2009, was bestowed with a 2009 National Ethnic Press and Media Council of Canada Award in the Distinguished Services category of Equality/Social Justice. She was named one of Canada's most influential women in Sports and Physical Activity in 2010 and received a City of Toronto Diversity Award in 2011. In 2012, she received a Queen Elizabeth II Diamond Jubilee Medal for her work as a public servant and the 2012 Canadian Association of Black Lawyers(CABL)Pathfinder Award. She was awarded the Jackie Robinson's Fortitude Award, named one of Canada's 100 most Accomplished Black Women in 2016, and named the 2017 Canadian National Laureate for the Rev. Dr. Martin Luther King, Jr. Lifetime Achievement Award.

Best has also been recognized by the Women's Multicultural Resource and Counselling Centre of Durham for her commitment to social and gender equality issues. She received a "Reaching Out and Giving Back Award" from the Prospect Primary School Alumni Association of Canada, and a Professional Award of Excellence from the Federation of St. Kitts and Nevis.

=== Cabinet posts ===
McGuinty ministry, Province of Ontario (2003–2013)
Cabinet posts (2)
Predecessor	Office	Successor
John Gerretsen	Minister of Consumer Services; 2011–2013	Tracy MacCharles
Jim Watson	Minister of Health Promotion; 2007–2011	Deb Matthews

== Electoral record ==
2011 Ontario general election
Party	Candidate	Votes	%	±%
Liberal	Margarett Best	15,606		
Progressive Conservative	Gary Ellis	9,137		
New Democratic	Lorri Urban	6,193		
Green	Naoshad Pochkhanawala	413		
Libertarian	Sam Apelbaum	407		
Freedom	Matthew Oliver	134		
Total valid votes			100.0	

2007 Ontario general election
Party	Candidate	Votes	%	±%
Liberal	Margarett Best	14,413	42.5	
Progressive Conservative	Gary Grant	9,484	28.0	
New Democratic	Neethan Shan	7,442	21.9	
Green	Glenn Kitchen	1,812	5.3	
Libertarian	Sam Apelbaum	487	1.4	
Family Coalition	Daniel Carvalho	290	0.9	
Total valid votes		33,928	100.0	
