= Ministry of Children, Community and Social Services =

Canadian government agency

- Ministère des Services à l’enfance et des Services sociaux et communautaires (French)
- Government of Ontario wordmark

Government ministry overview
- Formed: 1930
- Jurisdiction: Ontario
- Headquarters: 438 University Avenue, 7th floor, Toronto, ON M7A 1N3
- Ministers responsible: Michael Parsa, Minister of Children, Community and Social Services; Charmaine Williams, Associate Minister for Women's Social and Economic Opportunity
- Deputy Minister responsible: Daniele Zanotti
- Parent department: Government of Ontario
- Child Government ministry: Child agencies
- Website: www.ontario.ca/page/ministry-children-community-and-social-services

The Ministry of Children, Community and Social Services (French: Ministère des Services à l’enfance et des Services sociaux et communautaires) is the ministry in Ontario, Canada responsible for services to children and youth, social services such as welfare, the Ontario Disability Support Program, and community service programs to address homelessness, domestic violence, spousal support, adoption, and assisted housing for people with disabilities. Michael Parsa was appointed Minister of Children, Community and Social Services after the resignation of Merrilee Fullerton in 2023.

== Ontario Works ==
Ontario Works is a social assistance program overseen by the ministry. Prior to 1997, persons requiring this assistance received support under the General Welfare Assistance Act. Its origins are in the Ontario Works Act, 1997 as a workfare program which began under the Mike Harris government.

In 2014, a $240-million Social Assistance Management System (SAMS) software platform deployed by IBM's Cúram Software caused $20 million of overpayments to 17,000 Ontario Works or Ontario Disability Support Program (OW/ODSP) recipients, while thousands of others received token $5 monthly payments or nothing at all. Some were unable to pay for rent or electricity, in some cases leading to their eviction. Others were manually issued paper cheques.

== Juvenile corrections ==
The ministry operates correctional facilities for juveniles who are convicted of crimes.

Secure juvenile facilities include:

- Arrell Youth Centre (Hamilton, Ontario)
- Donald Doucet Youth Centre (Sault Ste. Marie)
- Cecil Facer Youth Centre (Greater Sudbury)
- Kennedy House Youth Centre (Ajax)
- Portage Youth Centre (Kenora)
- Peninsula Youth Centre (Fenwick, Ontario)
- Ge-Da-Gi-Binez Youth Centre (Fort Frances)
- William E. Hay Youth Centre (Ottawa)
- Justice Ronald Lester Youth Centre (Thunder Bay)
- Roy McMurtry Youth Centre (Brampton)
- Syl Apps Youth Centre (Oakville)
- Sprucedale Youth Centre (Simcoe)

== Ministry agencies ==
The ministry is currently responsible for three agencies:

- Council of The Ontario College of Social Workers and Social Service Workers
- Ontario’s Youth Justice Task Force
- Soldier's Aid Commission

== List of ministers ==
Name	Term of office		Name	Term of office		Political party (Ministry)	Note
Minister of Public Welfare						Conservative (Hearst)	
William Martin				15 December 1930	10 July 1934	Conservative (Hearst)	
David Croll				10 July 1934	14 April 1937	Liberal (Hepburn)	
Mitch Hepburn				14 April 1937	14 October 1937	Liberal (Hepburn)	Concurrently Premier
Eric Cross				14 October 1937	1 January 1940	Liberal (Hepburn)	
???				1 January 1940	27 May 1941	Liberal (Hepburn)	
Farquhar Oliver				27 May 1941	12 October 1942	Liberal (Hepburn)	
Harold Kirby				21 October 1942	18 May 1943	Liberal (Conant)	
Farquhar Oliver				18 May 1943	17 August 1943	Liberal (Nixon)	
Percy Vivian				17 August 1943	7 January 1946	Conservative (Drew)	
Bill Goodfellow				7 January 1946	19 October 1948	Conservative (Drew)	
Bill Goodfellow				19 October 1948	4 May 1949	Conservative (Kennedy)	
Bill Goodfellow				4 May 1949	4 May 1955	Conservative (Frost)	
Louis-Pierre Cecile				17 August 1955	8 November 1961	Conservative (Frost)	
Louis-Pierre Cecile				8 November 1961	24 November 1966	Conservative (Robarts)	
John Yaremko				24 November 1966	22 March 1967	Conservative (Robarts)	
Minister of Social and Family Services						Conservative (Robarts)	
John Yaremko				22 March 1967	1 March 1971	Conservative (Robarts)	
Thomas Leonard Wells				1 March 1971	2 February 1972	Conservative (Davis)	
Rene Brunelle				1 March 1971	10 April 1972	Conservative (Davis)	
Minister of Community and Social Services						Conservative (Davis)	
Rene Brunelle				10 April 1972	7 October 1975	Conservative (Davis)	
James A. Taylor				7 October 1975	3 February 1977	Conservative (Davis)	
Keith Norton				3 February 1977	10 April 1981	Conservative (Davis)	
Frank Drea				10 April 1981	29 September 1983	Conservative (Davis)	
Bruce McCaffrey (interim)				29 September 1983	21 November 1983	Conservative (Davis)	Concurrently; Provincial Secretary for Social Development
Frank Drea				21 November 1983	8 February 1985	Conservative (Davis)	
Robert Elgie				8 February 1985	17 May 1985	Conservative (Miller)	
Ernie Eves				17 May 1985	26 June 1985	Conservative (Miller)	
John Sweeney				26 June 1985	2 August 1989	Liberal (Peterson)	
Charles Beer				2 August 1989	1 October 1990	Liberal (Peterson)	
Zanana Akande				1 October 1990	10 October 1991	NDP (Rae)	
Marion Boyd				15 October 1991	3 February 1993	NDP (Rae)	
Tony Silipo				3 February 1993	25 June 1995	NDP (Rae)	
David Tsubouchi				26 June 1995	16 August 1996	PC (Harris)	
Janet Ecker				16 August 1996	17 June 1999	PC (Harris)	
John Baird				17 June 1999	14 April 2002	PC (Harris)	Designated "Minister Responsible for Children" after February 8, 2001
Minister of Community, Family and Children's Services						PC (Eves)	
Brenda Elliott				15 April 2002	22 October 2003	PC (Eves)	
Minister of Community and Social Services			Minister of Children and Youth Services			Liberal (McGuinty)	
Sandra Pupatello	23 October 2003	5 April 2006	Marie Bountrogianni	23 October 2003	29 June 2005	Liberal (McGuinty)	
Sandra Pupatello	23 October 2003	5 April 2006	Mary Anne Chambers	29 June 2005	30 October 2007	Liberal (McGuinty)	
Madeleine Meilleur	5 April 2006	20 October 2011	Mary Anne Chambers	29 June 2005	30 October 2007	Liberal (McGuinty)	
Madeleine Meilleur	5 April 2006	20 October 2011	Deb Matthews	30 October 2007	7 October 2009	Liberal (McGuinty)	
Madeleine Meilleur	5 April 2006	20 October 2011	Laurel Broten	7 October 2009	20 October 2011	Liberal (McGuinty)	
John Milloy	20 October 2011	11 February 2013	Eric Hoskins	20 October 2011	13 November 2012	Liberal (McGuinty)	
John Milloy	20 October 2011	11 February 2013	Laurel Broten	13 November 2012	11 February 2013	Liberal (McGuinty)	
Ted McMeekin	11 February 2013	24 June 2014	Teresa Piruzza	11 February 2013	24 June 2014	Liberal (Wynne)	
Helena; Jaczek	24 June 2014	26 February 2018	Tracey MacCharles	24 June 2014	13 June 2016	Liberal (Wynne)	
Helena; Jaczek	24 June 2014	26 February 2018	Michael Coteau	13 June 2016	29 June 2018	Liberal (Wynne)	
Michael Coteau	26 February 2018	29 June 2018	Michael Coteau	13 June 2016	29 June 2018	Liberal (Wynne)	
Minister of Children, Community and Social Services						PC (Ford)	
Lisa MacLeod				29 June 2018	29 June 2019	PC (Ford)	
Todd Smith				29 June 2019	18 June 2021	PC (Ford)	
Merrilee Fullerton				18 June 2021	24 March 2023	PC (Ford)	
Michael Parsa				24 March 2023	present	PC (Ford)	

== See also ==
- Family Responsibility Office
- List of youth detention incidents in Canada
