= Cúram Software =

Irish software company

Cúram Software Ltd.
- Industry: Software
- Founded: 1990 (as IT Design)
- Fate: sold to IBM in 2011
- Headquarters: Dublin, Ireland
- Key people: John Hearne co-founder and CEO, Ronan Rooney co-founder and CTO
- Products: Cúram Business Application Suite
- Number of employees: 600+
- Website: www.merative.com/curam

Cúram Software was an Irish software company headquartered in Dublin, Ireland with offices in Australia, Germany, India, the United Kingdom and the United States. The company produces Social Enterprise Management (SEM) software and offers consulting services, certification, and training. Their name is an Irish, and Scottish Gaelic, word for "Care and Protection". The company was founded in 1990.

== History ==
John Hearne, co-founded Cúram, which was initially called IT Design, in 1990 with Ronan Rooney, whom he worked with at Apple Computer. It was renamed to Cúram Software in 2003.

Their main software product was the Cúram Business Application Suite. This administrative software packages that allowed welfare and unemployment agencies to manage the programs they administer. The company's products found government buyers in a number of U.S. states, Canadian Provinces, Australia, New Zealand, Germany, Guernsey, UK, etc. According to Federal Computer Week, purchasers of the software, both in the US and internationally found that by integrating information technology systems, their government would save time and money; reduce waste, fraud and abuse; improve data accuracy; and provide better assistance to individuals and families in a holistic manner.

It was purchased by IBM in December 2011. The purchase of Cúram was part of the investments IBM is making to support the convergence of health and human services issues and gives healthcare organizations the ability to focus on the “whole individual” when addressing the causes of health and disease. The commitment is “unprecedented” in that it allows IBM customers to implement strategies that improve the health of the population as well as the patient experience while also managing the growth of costs. IBM's acquisition of Cúram brought enterprise capabilities into IBM's broader Smarter Care strategy. At the time of acquisition, IBM's software division capabilities expanded significantly when the almost 300 local Cúram staff were added to the 1,000 IBM staff already working on software as part of the Smarter Care offerings. These capabilities resulted in Cúram being chosen as a key component for New York State's Medicaid redesign program.

John Hearne and Ronan Rooney remained with IBM until early 2016, when IBM formed the new IBM Watson Health division, and Cúram software became a part of the offerings in government health and human services.

In January 2023, IBM announced the deal to sell off the healthcare data and analytics assets of its Watson Health business to Bay Area-based Francisco Partners. Financial terms of the deal were not disclosed at the time, but Bloomberg reported the price tag to be more than $1 billion. Six months after scooping up the health analytics assets of IBM Watson Health, private equity firm Francisco Partners used them to launch a new healthcare data company, called Merative, headquartered in Ann Arbor, Michigan.

A system deployed by Cúram for Minnesota health insurance exchange MNsure caused widely reported problems in 2013, including duplicate applications, delayed applications and applicants losing employment being left with no coverage at all for a month or more.

Your product has not delivered promised functionality and has seriously hindered Minnesotans' abilities to purchase health insurance or apply for public health care programs through MNsure. I request that you immediately deploy whatever people or resources are needed to correct the defects in your product that are preventing Minnesotans from obtaining health insurance through MNsure.

— Gov. Mark Dayton

In March, 2014 MNsure's interim CEO Scott Leitz reported that things are working better due to 100 new staff members at its overloaded call center and fewer website errors. According to Leitz, “It’s stable and it is in much better shape than it was in the fall and it’s the best place for people to go.”

In 2014, an IBM/Cúram system deployed for the Ministry of Community and Social Services (Ontario) welfare programme "Ontario Works" caused thousands of duplicate payments, while not paying many welfare recipients at all. Some were unable to pay for rent or electricity, in some cases leading to their eviction.

On Tuesday, April 21, 2015 - Ontario Public Service Employees Union (OPSEU) made a publication highlighting their serious concerns over Cúram implementation and the negative impact to their front-line workers.

“OPSEU estimates that post-implementation technical flaws have added an additional $110 million to the overall cost of SAMS....” “...Unfortunately, SAMS has undermined their ability to deliver a reliable public service and there is legitimate fear that SAMS has undermined public confidence in social assistance program delivery....”

— SAMS: More Than A "Glitch", OPSEU

In April, 2016 the Government of Ontario awarded IBM a $32M contract despite 18 months of problems associated with the software responsible for tracking Ontarians on social assistance.

Cúram software is still being used today in projects around the world. In Denmark and Catalonia, Spain, the healthcare sector is using Cúram intended to cut re-admissions and improve care. In Florida, the South Florida Behavioral Network is using the software to improve care coordination, preventing gaps in care for people suffering from mental illnesses.

It is still being used to connect benefits administrators, healthcare agencies, clinicians and case managers across more than 40 healthcare and service providers.

== Usage ==
Social Security Scotland

- As part of the Social Security (Scotland) Act 2018 Social Security Scotland was formed. It delivers benefits to over 1 million people and annually spends over £6 billion. All Social Security benefits are delivered through Cúram.

Employment and Social Development Canada

- As part of the Government of Canada’s Benefits Delivery Modernization program, its Old Age Security benefit went live in June 2023, onboarding its first group of 600,000 benefits clients.

Government of Ontario

- Cúram has been used in the implementation of four separate projects across Ontario, including the Ministry of Children, Community and Social Services, Ontario Developmental Services, Child Protection Information Network, and Ministry of Colleges and Universities.

Clark County, Nevada

- Clark County Social Service (CCSS) Department provides various services for needy residents of Clark County who are not assisted by other state, federal, or local programs. CCSS selected Cúram as the basis for the Automated Case Management and Eligibility System (ACES) to replace its legacy benefits system.

South Carolina

- The South Carolina Department of Health and Human Services (SCDHHS) administers the Medicaid program. This joint state-federal program provides health care for over 1.3 million low-income, elderly, and disabled residents annually. In 2012, Cúram was deployed to enable SCDHHS to implement its Member Management System (MMS) to determine MAGI Medicaid eligibility as part of the Member Management Replacement Project (MMRP).

Germany: Hamburg Dataport BASFI JUS-IT

- The Hamburg Authority of Labour Family and Integration (BASFI) is supported by a public services ICT provider called Dataport, which handles IT implementations and systems for government agencies in several German states. Between 2011 and 2013, IBM (Cúram) delivered a youth and general social affairs system called JUS-IT in Hamburg for Dataport. It delivers modernised youth services, basic security, social assistance and housing allowance across the State.
