= Daniele Zanotti =

Non-profit executive and Ontario deputy minister

Daniele Zanotti is a non-profit executive and deputy minister of the Ministry of Children, Community and Social Services in the Government of Ontario. He served as the president and chief executive officer of United Way Greater Toronto. Before leading United Way Greater Toronto, he was CEO of United Way York Region from 2007.

== Early life ==
Zanotti graduated from St. Michael’s College School in 1987. He graduated from the University of Toronto in 1993 with a Master's in Social Work.

== Career ==
Zanotti became CEO of United Way York Region in 2007. In 2016, he became head of United Way Greater Toronto, an organization that serves Toronto, York Region and Peel Region. He had led the merging of United Way of Toronto, United Way of York Region, and United Way of Peel Region to create United Way Greater Toronto, which is the largest private funder of social services in the Toronto region. In 2016, he received the Order of Vaughan from the City of Vaughan.

In August 2024, Zanotti left the organization to become deputy minister of Ontario's Ministry of Children, Community and Social Services.
