= Family Responsibility Office =

Ontario government agency that enforces child and spousal support

- Bureau des obligations familiales

Agency overview
- Formed: 1987 (enforcement program); 1996 (as the Family Responsibility Office)
- Jurisdiction: Ontario
- Headquarters: Toronto, Ontario
- Employees: 422 (March 31, 2025)
- Annual budget: $48.7 million (2024–25)
- Parent department: Ministry of Children, Community and Social Services
- Website: www.ontario.ca/page/enforcing-child-and-spousal-support-payments

The Family Responsibility Office (FRO; French: Bureau des obligations familiales) is an agency of the Government of Ontario that collects, distributes and enforces court-ordered child support and spousal support. All support orders made by Ontario courts are filed with the office, which collects payments from the person ordered to pay and passes them on to the recipient. In the 2024–25 fiscal year it administered more than 116,000 cases, representing nearly 235,500 people, and collected and disbursed about $600 million.

The office operates under the Family Responsibility and Support Arrears Enforcement Act, 1996. It is a division of the Ministry of Children, Community and Social Services. It has been audited repeatedly by the Auditor General of Ontario and has often been the provincial body generating the most complaints to the Ontario Ombudsman.

== History ==
=== Early enforcement program (1987–1996) ===
Since July 1987, all Ontario court orders for child and spousal support have been filed automatically with the provincial enforcement program. Separation agreements and orders made before July 1987 can be filed voluntarily. The Auditor General has described the program's mandate as unchanged since it began in 1987: to enforce family-support obligations, "aggressively if necessary", and to pass payments on to recipients promptly. In March 1992, an amendment allowed the program to collect up to half of a payor's net monthly income directly from sources such as an employer or a pension fund. The program then operated as the Family Support Plan under the Family Support Plan Act, 1992.

=== 1996 reorganization ===
On October 2, 1996, Attorney General Charles Harnick introduced Bill 82, the Family Responsibility and Support Arrears Enforcement Act, 1996, which replaced the 1992 Act and created the Family Responsibility Office. In his statement to the legislature, Harnick said that 77% of the plan's cases were not in full compliance, that close to $1 billion in child support was outstanding, and that only 6% of the up to 50,000 daily calls to the plan's offices got through. He announced that operations would be consolidated into one location. Opposition members criticized the change. Marion Boyd, Harnick's predecessor as Attorney General, said the plan's problems dated from 1987 "because there wasn't a plan before that". Liberal Gerry Phillips said the government had cut 290 people from family support staffing.

The consolidation had already begun in August 1996, when the plan started closing its eight regional offices. The central office opened in December 1996. According to the Provincial Auditor, staff fell from 340 to 200 and the backlog grew to more than 90,000 transactions. The backlog was largely cleared by November 1997 with temporary staff, and staffing returned to its earlier level by the end of 1998. The 1996 Act also allowed the parties to opt out of the office's enforcement by mutual agreement.

=== Later developments ===
Responsibility for the office moved from the Ministry of the Attorney General to the Ministry of Community, Family and Children's Services on April 9, 2001. After 2003 the office spent about $21 million over three and a half years trying to build a new information technology system. The project was abandoned in December 2006 without a system being put into service, and the office later committed $50 million to a replacement. An online self-service portal, FRO Online, was launched in 2015.

== Enforcement powers ==
When a payor does not pay, the office can:

- garnish income, including wages, federal payments such as income tax refunds, and lottery winnings
- suspend provincial and federal licences, including a driver's licence or passport
- report the payor to a credit bureau and to professional bodies such as the Law Society of Ontario
- register liens against land and personal property, and file writs of seizure
- start a court hearing to request an arrest warrant

Through a Federal Support Deduction Notice, the office can require the federal government to deduct up to 100% of a payor's tax refund and other federal credits, and up to 50% of Employment Insurance benefits. The office can also enforce support orders from the other Canadian provinces and territories, every U.S. state and more than 55 other countries.

== Audits and oversight ==
=== Arrears ===
Support arrears owed through the office
Date	Arrears	Cases	Source
March 31, 1994	$700 million	126,000 registered	
March 31, 1999	$1.2 billion	over 170,000 registered	
March 31, 2003	about $1.3 billion	about 180,600	
December 31, 2009	$1.6 billion	about 190,000	
March 31, 2025	almost $2.1 billion	over 116,000	

In 1999, about 75% of active cases were in arrears. By 2010, about one-third of payors were in full compliance, one-third in partial compliance and one-third in non-compliance. In 2024–25, about 38% of cases were fully compliant, 38% partially compliant and 24% made no payments. The collection rate stayed between 66 and 68 cents per dollar owed from 2020–21 to 2024–25.

=== Auditor General findings ===
The 2003 audit found that the office lacked satisfactory systems for starting enforcement. Caseloads averaged 890 per caseworker, and about 1,500 cases with arrears totalling $126.7 million had not been assigned to a caseworker. The audit also noted that the ministry had said in 1996 that the computer system "must be replaced", but it was still in use.

The 2010 audit found that it took at least five months to register and begin enforcing new orders. Nearly 80% of calls to the office's call centre did not get through; 78% of the auditors' own test calls failed. The office was taking enforcement action in only about one in four or one in five cases each year. At hearings of the legislature's Standing Committee on Public Accounts in March 2011, the deputy minister reported $647 million collected in the previous year and arrears of $1.7 billion. She said the top 10% of arrears cases, about 13,000, accounted for more than half of that amount.

A 2026 special report by Auditor General Shelley Spence found that 92% of the nearly 5,500 court orders received in 2024–25 missed the office's four-month registration target. The average time to registration and first payment was eight and a half months, and 22% of cases took more than a year. The report also found:

- income garnishment was not in place for 20% of non-compliant cases
- the office held about $14.1 million in overpayments collected from payors across 14,860 cases
- the office did not have dates of birth recorded for 64% of child support cases
- 43 former employees still had access to databases containing personal information
- case management officers did not answer 65% of calls directed to them
- the active caseload fell by 30,661 (about 21%) over five years while staffing stayed virtually unchanged

The report concluded that many of the office's "systems, processes and policies to enforce child and spousal support obligations were not consistently effective". The office agreed with 10 of the 11 recommendations.

=== Ombudsman complaints ===
The Ontario Ombudsman reviewed the office in 2006. In 2014–15, Ombudsman André Marin received 1,167 complaints about the office, up from 794 two years earlier. He reported that the office had to reimburse 350 people about $845,000 in retroactive payments. In 2015–16, his successor Paul Dubé received 1,025 complaints about the office, which again topped the list of provincial organizations.

== See also ==
- Child support
- Ontario Ombudsman
