= McGuinty ministry =

Cabinet of Ontario, 2003–2013

- ministry of Ontario

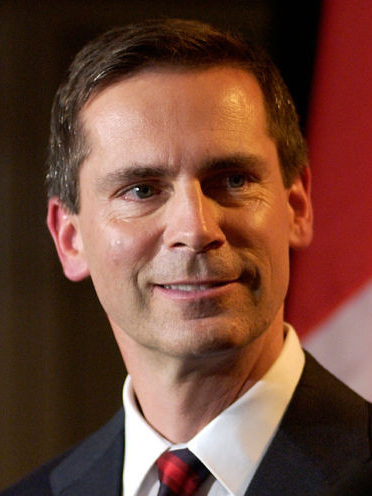
- Premier Dalton McGuinty in 2004
- Date formed: October 23, 2003
- Date dissolved: February 11, 2013

People and organisations
- Monarch: Elizabeth II
- Lieutenant Governor: James Bartleman (to 2007); David Onley (from 2007)
- Premier: Dalton McGuinty
- Deputy Premier: George Smitherman (2006–09); Dwight Duncan (2011–13)
- No. of ministers: 23 (2003); 23 ~ 28 (while in majority); 17 ~ 22 (while in minority)
- Total no. of members: 46
- Member party: Liberal
- Status in legislature: Majority (to 2011); Minority (from 2011)
- Opposition cabinet: PC shadow cabinet
- Opposition party: Progressive Conservative
- Opposition leader: Ernie Eves (2003–04); John Tory (2005–07); Tim Hudak (2009–14); Bob Runciman (interim 2004–05, 07–09)

History
- Incoming formation: 2003 Ontario general election
- Outgoing formation: 2013 Liberal leadership contest
- Elections: 2003, 2007, 2011,
- Legislature terms: 38th, 39th, 40th
- Predecessor: Eves ministry
- Successor: Wynne ministry

The McGuinty ministry was the cabinet (formally the Executive Council of Ontario) Government of Ontario, a province in Canada, that was in office from October 23, 2003 to February 11, 2013. It was led by Ontario's 24th premier, Dalton McGuinty. The ministry consisted of members of the Ontario Liberal Party, which commanded for the first eight year a majority, and it in the final one-and-a-half year a minority of the seats in the Legislative Assembly of Ontario.

The McGuinty ministry entered office following the 2003 Ontario general election, replacing the previous Progressive Conservative Eves ministry. The ministry governed through all of the 38th and 39th Parliaments of Ontario, as well as the first sixteen months of the 40th Parliament of Ontario. After governing with a comfortable majority for eight years, the McGuinty ministry was significantly weakened following the 2011 election as it entered bargaining season with various public sector unions while under increased fiscal constraints in 2012. McGuinty's October 2012 surprised announcement of his pending retirement commenced the curtail call for his ministry and kicked start the 2012-13 Ontario Liberal leadership contest that led to the formation of the successor Wynne ministry in February 2013.

== Overview ==
=== Place in history ===
The formation of the McGuinty ministry kick-started a fifteen-year period of Liberal administration in Ontario. It accomplished several feats that drew comparisons to the nineteenth-century Liberal Mowat ministry, the longest-tenured ministry in Ontario's history, having lasted twenty-three years and nine months, and placed the McGuinty ministry as among the most successful ministries in Ontario's history.

In office for nine years and three months, the McGuinty ministry was the second longest-tenured Liberal ministry in Ontario's history, and ranks sixth among all Ontario ministries, being one day shorter than the fifth-ranked Robarts ministry. The McGuinty ministry is the only Liberal ministry since the 19th-century Mowat ministry to have won more than two electoral mandates.

Dalton McGuinty was the only fourth Ontario Liberal leader to lead the party from the opposition bench into government, (Note: the three previous leaders being Edward Blake in 1871, Mitch Hepburn in 1934, and David Peterson in 1985) and is to date the only Liberal leader to have secured a comeback victory following prior electoral defeat. (Note: in 1995) The Liberals were previously ousted from power in 1990, the year McGuinty became the caucus' only rookie.

In handing the baton to Kathleen Wynne, McGuinty became the fourth Liberal Premier to have successfully orchestrated a leadership transition to a successor who went on to secure their own electoral mandate, and the only one to have done so handing power to a successor democratically chosen by the party. The three previous Liberal Premiers to have accomplished this, Edward Blake, Oliver Mowat and Arthur Hardy, did so respectively in 1872, 1896 and 1899 (the 1899 transition to George Ross) while enjoying largely unfettered ability to designate their successors.

The Liberal administration of the McGuinty ministry and the successor Wynne ministry was the third period in Ontario history where a political party successfully retained power under more than one leader. The two prior periods of successive ministries of the same political party were the 34-year Blake-Mowat-Hardy-Ross Liberal government (1871 to 1905), and the 42-year continuous Progressive Conservative rule known as the Big Blue Machine (1943 to 1985).

=== Nexus in Liberal legacy ===
Having been in power just thirteen years earlier, the 2003 Liberal caucus consisted of seven cabinet veterans who served in the Peterson ministry (in office 1985–90). Among them, McGuinty secured the speakership for Alvin Curling, and included five of the seven in his inaugural cabinet: Jim Bradley, Monte Kwinter, Greg Sorbara, David Ramsay, and Gerry Phillips. A ministry member who joined in 2007, Aileen Carroll, had prior federal cabinet experience from the Martin ministry.

McGuinty included all four former leadership rivals who were in caucus in 2003 in his cabinet and entrusted them with key portfolios. Principal rival Gerard Kennedy served as the first education minister to the self-styled "education premier". Despite having backed Kennedy in the final ballot, Dwight Duncan served as finance and energy minister and was designated as deputy premier in 2011. John Gerretsen, whose unexpected support gave McGuinty the crucial momentum to leapfrog Duncan and to remain a viable contender, served in various portfolios including Attorney General and environment. Kingmaker Joe Cordiano was given the prominent economic development portfolio.

A noticeable exclusion from the McGuinty ministry was Tony Ruprecht, the only Peterson era minister not included. Ruprecht was one of only four caucus supporter of McGuinty 1996 leadership bid, the only one not from Ottawa and the only one remaining in caucus in 2003. McGuinty did have some backers of his leadership bid in his ministry, however, including Greg Sorbara (who was not an MPP in 1996) and later Bob Chiarelli (a caucus supporter who left the legislature in 1997 and was Ottawa Mayor in 2003, returned to Queen's Park in 2010).

Seventeen members of the McGuinty ministry continued to serve in the Wynne ministry, and an eighteenth member, Monique Smith, served as Wynne's transition chief of staff and then Washington envoy. Jim Bradley, who had served the entire duration of the Peterson ministry and was the dean of the legislature at the start of the McGuinty ministry, served the entire duration of the McGuinty ministry, and continued in the Wynne ministry. He was the only minister to have served in all three contemporary Ontario Liberal ministries, and was the environment minister in all three ministries.

=== Size and composition ===
The McGuinty ministry had 46 members in total over its almost decade-long tenure. Its membership grew from its initial 23 members to reach its peak of 28 members after its second majority victory. McGuinty reduced his cabinet to 22 members following the 2011 election while promising to "lead with humility" in acknowledgement of the reduced minority mandate given by the electorate. The ministry was reduced to 17 members in ministry's final months, as five of its members resigned to enter the contest to be McGuinty's successor.

McGuinty eschewed the practice of appointing minister without portfolio (either as junior ministers or for overseeing specific initiative) throughout his premiership. The only usage of the position was to retain Gerry Phillips in cabinet as chair and advisor following Phillips' request to be relived of the energy portfolio.

=== Ministerial Tenure ===
Six members of the McGuinty ministry served for its entire duration (9 yrs, 3 mns, 22 days): Jim Bradley; Rick Bartolucci; Dwight Duncan; John Gerretsen; Chris Bentley; Madeleine Meilleur. A seventh member, Harinder Takhar, would also have done so if not for McGuinty requiring ministers wishing to enter the leadership contest to step down. Three members have previously served for the entire duration of the Peterson ministry (5yrs, 3mns, 7days): Jim Bradley; Monte Kwinter; Greg Sorbara. Five members went on to serve the entire duration of the successor Wynne ministry (5yrs, 4mns, 17days): Kathleen Wynne; Michael Chan; Michael Gravelle; Bob Chiarelli; Charles Sousa.

As the only person to have served in all three Ontario Liberal ministries in the contemporary era, Jim Bradley's 17-year, 10-month, 27-day accumulated cabinet tenure is by far the lengthiest among Liberals in well over a century, (Note: Due the lengthy opposition periods before and after the Hepburn ministry, there were virtually no opportunity for Ontario Liberal ministers to accumulate tenure in non-successive ministries in the 20th century. The three members of the Hepburn ministry with additional cabinet experience obtained them from service in a rival party's ministry (Harry Nixon in the United Farmers Drury ministry 1919–23), in a federal ministry (Peter Heenan in the King ministry 1926–30) or in a ministry of a different province (Duncan Marshall in the Alberta's Rutherford ministry), none of them had a total ministry tenure exceeding 13 years.) and the fifth longest-serving among all Ontario Liberals since confederation, behind only the three nineteenth century Premiers Sir Oliver Mowat (26 years from 1872–96 in his own ministry, plus 1863–64 in pre-confederation ministries, and 1896–97 in the Laurier ministry), Arthur Hardy (over 22 years, 1877–99), and Sir George Ross (over 21 years, 1883–1905) and Mowat's Commissioner of Public Works Christopher Fraser (over 20 years, 1873–94)

In addition to Bradley, eight McGuinty ministry members accumulated over a decade of cabinet services: Madeleine Meilleur (12yrs, 8mns, 21days); Kathleen Wynne (11yrs, 7mns, 5days); Michael Chan (11yrs, 5mns, 8days); Gerry Phillips (11 years, 1 day shy of); John Gerretsen (10yrs, 9mons, 1day); Michael Gravelle (10yrs, 9mns); Brad Duguid & Deb Matthews (10yrs, 3mns, 20days)

=== Portfolio Tenure ===
McGuinty was not in the habit of keeping ministers in portfolios for extended periods. Other than McGuinty himself holding the premiership, no ministers held an actual ministerial portfolio for the ministry's entire tenure (Madeleine Meilleur was responsible for Francophone Affairs throughout, but it was not a ministerial portfolio at the time). Discounting McGuinty's three stints as his own intergovernmental affairs ministers, only three ministers held any single portfolio for more than five years: Dwight Duncan (finance 2007–13); Madeleine Meilleur (community and social services 2006–11), Rick Bartolucci (northern development & mines 2003–07, 2011–13). (Brad Duguid and Michael Gravelle would later accumulate more than five years of services respectively as economic development minister and northern development minister, holding those portfolios for extended periods in the Wynne ministry.)

== Demographic representation ==
=== Women in charge ===
The McGuinty ministry counted 16 women among its members over its decade-long tenure. Between January 2010 and October 2011, 11 women served in cabinet simultaneously and occupied 42% of the cabinet seats, rivaling the record of 12 women, 43% of cabinet set by the NDP Rae ministry in 1991. Several women held positions from which they exercised significant influence. The five portfolios with the largest budget – health, education, community and social services, training colleges and universities, and transportation – were all held by women in McGuinty ministry at some point, and so were the high-profile economic portfolios like economic development and natural resources. The substantial power wielded by women in the McGuinty ministry was evident with its curtain call, the 2013 Ontario Liberal leadership contest, which featured two women as principal contenders.

However, the outlook for women did not look promising at the beginning. It entered office with only five women, one fewer than the predecessor Progressive Conservative Eves ministry, making up of just 22% of cabinet. More jarring was that none of the prominent or powerful roles were occupied by women, a sharp contrast to the Eves' cabinet where women held the most powerful roles (finance minister; deputy premier) and some of the portfolios with the largest budget (education; training, colleges and universities). At the start of the McGuinty ministry, Sandra Pupatello and Mary Anne Chambers held Community and Social Services and Training, Colleges and Universities respectively, the third and the forth largest-budget, but relatively low profile portfolios in the government.

In his first major shuffle in 2005, McGuinty elevated 37-year-old lawyer Laurel Broten to cabinet in the high-profile role of environment minister. Later in 2005, Donna Cansfield was elevated and was given the sensitive energy portfolio. In early 2006, Sandra Pupatello was promoted to the top-tier post of education minister upon Gerard Kennedy's resignation. Madeleine Meilleur was promoted to Pupatello's community and social services portfolio while Caroline Di Cocco was elevated to cabinet to fill Meilleur previous role of culture minister. Pupatello's time in education was brief, however. The departure of Joe Cordiano led to Pupatello being given his prestigious, high-profile economic development portfolio, and the elevation of Kathleen Wynne to cabinet and a direct promotion as education minister.

As the end of its first term, the McGuinty ministry counted nine women among its 26 ministers. Two of the original members, Marie Bountrogianni and Mary Anne Chambers did not stand for re-election, and two newer members did not survive the post-election shuffle. Caroline Di Cocco was the only cabinet casualty in the 2007 election. Laurel Broten attracted controversy with the Flick Off marketing campaign for energy conservation, and returned to the backbench at the 2007 post election shuffle. Women's presence was maintained with the entrance of Deb Matthews (a former party president), Monique Smith (a former chief of staff to McGuinty), Aileen Carroll (a former federal minister), and Margarett Best. Three more women entered ministry in January, 2010: Linda Jeffrey, Carol Mitchell, and Sophia Aggelonitis.

=== Reflecting Ontario's diversity ===
Compared to previous ministries, the McGuinty ministry slightly improved the representation of Ontario's significant visible minorities population (which stood at just over 20% when the McGuinty ministry took office). Four racialized persons – Mary Anne Chamber, Harinder Takhar, Michael Chan, Margarett Best – served in the ministry, with the first three serving together from February to October 2007, and the latter three serving together from October 2007 onward. All four were elevated to cabinet immediately following their first election, with Chan being sworn in as revenue minister just 13 days after his by-election victory.

The 2003 Liberal caucus consisted of eight racialized persons. Among them, Mary Anne Chamber, a retired senior vice president of Scotiabank who was born in Jamaica, and Harinder Takhar, a certified management accountant born in the Indian state of Punjab, were among the inaugural members of the McGuinty ministry. The inclusion of Takhar made him the first South Asian person to serve in the Executive Council of Ontario.

The number of racialized persons in the Liberal caucus increased to 11 after the 2007 election. The number of racialized persons in the ministry remained at three for the rest of its tenure.

The Liberal caucus had two francophone members following the 2003 election, Jean-Marc Lalonde and Madeleine Meilleur. Meilleur was the only francophone member of the McGuinty ministry for its entire duration, and in the early years of the successor Wynne ministry.

=== Out in cabinet ===
With regard to LGBT representation in provincial ministry, Ontario lagged behind Quebec and British Columbia. (Note: With their first openly LGBT ministers named in 1996 and 2000 respectively) The McGuinty ministry caught Ontario up to those provinces with the appointment of Ontario's first, (Note: Although Peterson Ministry Attorney General Ian Scott sexuality was considered an open secret during his time in politics, he did not formally acknowledge it until his partner's death shortly after he left office.) second, and third openly LGBT ministers: George Smitherman, Kathleen Wynne, and Glen Murray. Each was at various times among the most prominent and influential members of the ministry, and was at different points entrusted with the largest, second largest, and fourth largest budget portfolios in the government.

George Smitherman, whose 1999 election in Toronto Centre made him the first out gay person elected to the Ontario legislature, became Ontario's first openly LGBT cabinet minister when the McGuinty ministry entered office. McGuinty appointed him the Minister of Health, a particularly significant portfolio for the LGBT community, and designating him the regional minister for Toronto. McGuinty further designated Smitherman as Deputy Premier, with specific acknowledgement of the "tremendous progress in bringing down wait times". The designation came three days after the second LGBT person being appointed to cabinet.

Kathleen Wynne, the first out woman to be elected at either the federal or provincial levels in Canada, (Note: She was however the second out woman to serve in a parliament, as NDP MP Libby Davies came out in 2001. Davies would not face re-election as an out woman until 2004.) was elevated to cabinet on September 18, 2006 as education minister, making her the first out woman to serve in cabinet not just in Ontario but anywhere in Canada. (Note: Agnès Maltais of the Parti Québécois was first appointed to the Bouchard ministry in 1998, but was not out until November 2003.) With Smitherman and Wynne respectively holding the health and education portfolios, McGuinty entrusted two core functions of his government, along with the stewardship of over 60% of the government budget, (Note: In fiscal year 2007, education's budget was $11.6B, health's budget was $34.6B, together account for 62.8% of the province $73.6B operating budget.) to openly LGBT cabinet members.

Smitherman resigned in 2010 to seek the Toronto mayoralty. Glen Murray, a former Winnipeg mayor, was recruited to contest his downtown Toronto seat, and was elevated to cabinet six months later. After the 2011 election, Murray was promoted to training, colleges and universities minister while Wynne was given the portfolios of municipal affairs and aboriginal affairs.

A fourth member of the McGuinty ministry came out publicly years after his departure. Jim Watson resigned in 2010 to seek the Ottawa mayoralty, and came out in 2019 during his fourth term as Ottawa's mayor.

== History ==
Date	Triggering events, significant moves	T	W
Oct 23, 2003	Major - Inauguration	23	5
Jun 29, 2005	Major shuffle (mid term); New: two new ministers	25	6
Oct 11, 2005	Departure: Greg Sorbora (finance)	25	7
Apr 5, 2006	Departure: Gerard Kennedy (education)	25	8
May 23, 2006	Return: Greg Sorbara (finance)	26	8
Sep 18, 2006	Departure: Joe Cordinano (econ. dev.); New: Kathleen Wynne (education)	26	9
Sep 21, 2006	Designation: George Smitherman as Deputy Premier	26	9
Feb 21, 2007	New: Michael Chan (Revenue)	27	9
Jun 21, 2007	Ministry: Aboriginal Affairs	27	9
Jul 26, 2007	Resignation: Mike Colle (immigration)	26	9
Oct 30, 2007	Major shuffle (post-election); New: ten new ministers Departure: eight incumbent ministers	28	9
Jun 20, 2008	Small scale shuffle: three ministers	28	9
Jul 8, 2008	Ministry (realignment) business, consumer, government services	28	9
Sep 18, 2008	Small scale shuffle: five ministers	28	9
May 25, 2009	Departure: Michael Bryant (ec. dev.)	27	9
Jun 24, 2009	Small scale shuffle: six ministers	27	9
Oct 7, 2009	Departure: David Caplan (health); Return: Laurel Broten	27	10
Nov 9, 2009	Departure: George Smitherman	26	10
Jan 12, 2010	Departure: Jim Watson (municipal affairs)	25	10
Jan 18, 2010	Major shuffle: four new ministers three incumbent ministers exited	26	11
Aug 18, 2010	Major shuffle: two new ministers Glen Murray (research & innovation); Bob Chiarelli (infrastructure)	28	11
Dec 16, 2010	Departure: Peter Fonseca (labour); New: Charles Sousa (immigration)	28	11
Oct 20, 2011	Major shuffle (post-election): Departure: six ministers defeated	22	6
November 2012	Resignation: five leadership contestants	17	5

Dalton McGuinty and his ministry entered office on October 23. 2023, and governed the province for close to a decade. During that time, McGuinty conducted five major, wide ranging cabinet shuffles, and made adjustments to the ministry's lineup in over a dozen instances in response to resignations, or other external events.

=== Formation ===
- Re-entered: 5 Peterson ministry veterans – Jim Bradley, Monte Kwinter, Greg Sorbara, David Ramsay, Gerry Phillips
- New Entrants: 4 former leadership rivals – Gerard Kennedy, Joe Cordiano, Dwight Duncan, John Gerretsen
  - 8 members with experience from opposition benches – Rick Bartolucci, Marie Bountrogianni, Michael Bryant, David Caplan, Leona Dombrowsky, Steve Peters, Sandra Pupatello, George Smitherman
  - 5 rookie members – Chris Bentley, Mary Anne Chambers, Madeleine Meilleur, Harinder Takhar, Jim Watson

The Ontario Liberal Party led by Dalton McGuinty won a decisive victory in the provincial election held on October 2, 2003, securing 72 of the 103 seats in the legislature. The McGuinty ministry, with 23 members, entered office on October 23, 2003.

McGuinty realigned the responsibilities of several ministerial portfolios, and reversed or altered all three euphemistic rebranding undertook by the Eves ministry:

- A new ministry, the Ministry of Children's Services (later renamed "Ministry of Children and Youth Services" in 2004), was created from the social service ministry and tasked with implementing the government's Best Start Plan and early childhood education commitments.
- The social service ministry resumed its former name Ministry of Community and Social Services, the name it used for three decades from 1972 to 2002, reversing the substitution of "social services" with "family services".
- The primary industry ministry resumed its former name Ministry of Economic Development and Trade, reversing the euphemistic rebranding of "Enterprise, Opportunity and Innovation".
- A new Ministry of Public Infrastructure Renewal was created to plan and manage the replacement and maintenance of aging infrastructure.
- McGuinty did not reverse Eves' sunsetting of the archaic name of "Ministry of Solicitor General" for the law enforcement ministry, but revised it further from public safety and correctional services to Ministry of Community Safety and Correctional Services.
- A new secretariat, headed by the "Minister Responsible for Democratic Renewal" was also created to improve engagement and participation in the democratic process by the youth and broader public. While it was not formally made a ministry, the secretariat became the second non-portfolio entity (after native affairs) to be granted its owns supply for the 2004-05 fiscal year.
- All associate minister positions were eliminated.

Thus the McGuinty ministry began with 23 cabinet members serving in 25 portfolios (including the Premiership). Two cabinet members held multiple portfolios.

=== 2005 Midterm Shuffle ===
- New Entrants: (2) Laurel Broten; Mike Colle

McGuinty's first cabinet shuffle occurred June 29, 2005, about four months before reaching the midway point of his first mandate. The shuffle ushered in Mike Colle, a veteran caucus member and 37-year-old lawyer Laurel Broten, who clerked at the Surpreme Court, with no minister exiting. McGuinty shuffled eight incumbent ministers, updated one minister's title to reflect a office name change and assigned himself an additional new portfolio. It was reported that placing more women in cabinet positions was a priority for McGuinty.

There were several instances of ministerial portfolio reorganization, all involving established cabinet ministers:

- Ministry of Research and Innovation was created.
- Ministry of Health Promotion was created, dedicated to promoting healthy living and illness prevention.
- Ministry of Government Services was created to improve human resources management and internal government operations. It also absorbed the "Ministry of Consumer and Business Services."
- Chair of the Management Board of Cabinet ceased to be a cabinet level position in its own right; many of its areas of responsibility were transferred to the new "Ministry of Government Services." Henceforth "Chair of the Management Board" would be the title of the head of a cabinet committee, and always exercised by whoever held the position of Minister of Finance.

Thus, the number of portfolios swelled to 26 (including the Premiership), held by 25 cabinet members.

=== Scandalous non-scandal ===
- Brief departure: (1) Greg Sorbara
- New Entrants: (1) Donna Cansfield

The McGuinty ministry was rocked by its first major crisis in the fall of 2005, when it was revealed that finance minister Greg Sorbara was named as a target in the criminal fraud investigation by the RCMP of Royal Group technologies Inc., a company for which he was a director prior to the Liberals entering government.Sorbora resigned from cabinet on October 12, 2005, and was replace by Dwight Duncan as finance minister. Duncan retained his non-portfolio title as chair of cabinet, while relinquishing his role as government house leader to veteran Jim Bradley. The event led to the entrance of Donna Cansfield into cabinet as energy minister. Canfield's elevation brought the number of women in cabinet to seven. She was third new entrant to the ministry, and the third Toronto caucus member and the second from Etobicoke to be promoted.

Being out of cabinet, Sorbara aggressively sought to clear his name. It soon became clear that the allegations specifically relating to Sorbara was limited to the pricing of a few minor real estate transaction worth $2.5 million completed by one of more than a hundred subsidiaries of Royal Group Technologies, within a sweeping investigation over transactions worth billions, and even that allegation was based upon the investigator misstating his conjecture and speculation as inference. A scathing decision issued on May 18, 2006 by the Superior Court of Justice concluded that there were no reasonable grounds for Sorbara to be named in the search warrant in the first place, and ordered that all portions of order naming Sorbara to be severed and quashed. McGuinty reinstalled Sorbara to his treasury perch days after, returned Duncan to the energy portfolio, and used the opportunity to put Harinder Takhar in a new portfolio titled "small business and entrepreneurship, partially unwinding the merger of consumer and business services into government services executed just a year earlier. Cansfield took over transportation from Takhar.

=== Old rivals departed, new rivalries foretold ===
- Departures: (2) Gerard Kennedy, Joe Cordiano
- New Entrants: (2) Caroline Di Cocco; Kathleen Wynne

Gerard Kennedy, McGuinty's erstwhile leadership rival on the final ballot, and Joe Cordiano, the rival who dealt the final blow to Kennedy's leadership bid and made McGuinty king, both voluntarily resigned in 2006 within months of each other. Kennedy stepped down on April 5, 2006, from the Ontario cabinet to entered the 2006 federal Liberal leadership contest. His crucial education brief was given to Sandra Pupatello, while his parliamentary assistant Kathleen Wynne remained in the junior post to serve the new minister. This transition of the education portfolio was a unique convergence of three caucus members who would be top three contenders at the party's subsequent leadership contest, and provide some clues into the dynamic of their later rivalry. Upon Kennedy's departure, McGuinty moved Madeleine Meilleur into Pupatello's social services portfolio, and elevated Sarnia MPP Caroline Di Cocco to take on the culture ministry.

Cordiano stepped down to join the private sector after the summer on September 18, 2006. The departure led to Pupatello being given his prestigious, high-profile economic development portfolio, and the elevation of Kathleen Wynne to cabinet and a direct promotion as education minister. The direct promotion of Wynne to the government's second largest portfolio, and the one priority file of the premier, surprised pundits, though discerning observers would have been aware of the McGuinty being impressed by the poverty-reduction strategy Wynne and Deb Matthews drew up in the early years of the government, which sparked the government's pursuit of the Ontario Child Benefit, various after-school programs and dental care for low-income people.

Wynne's promotion also made her the first out lesbian to serve in cabinet anywhere in Canada. An just three days later, McGuinty elevated another openly gay member, when he designated George Smitherman as deputy premier, a post he previously left dormant.

=== 2007 ===
- Departures: Mike Colle
- New Entrants: Michael Chan

The McGuinty ministry conducted itself cautiously as it entered the re-election year, with only a few minor adjustment made to the government's frontbench. In February, the Ministry of Revenue, eliminated by the Rae ministry in 1993, was recreated for the purpose of supporting the implementation of harmonized corporate tax collection system with the federal government. The new portfolio was given to Michael Chan, freshly elected in a byelection to fill the vacancy of Tony Wong, who resigned amid reported bitterness over his exclusion from cabinet despite assurances prior to the 2003 election. Chan's rapid promotion just 13 days after his election to a resurrected ministry deemed superfluous 13 years prior, in a hastily organized shuffle involving no other minister and with no Chinese media outlets in attendance fueled opposition questions about the true motive behind the appointment. Chan was the second person of Chinese decent to serve in Ontario cabinet, after Bob Wong who served in the Peterson ministry. His appointment brought the number of racialized person in cabinet to three, a new record for Ontario ministries.

In response to the recommendations by former Chief Justice of the Ontario Court of Justice Sidney B. Linden in the report of the Ipperwash Inquiry, the aboriginal affairs secretariat, first created in 1985 by the previous Liberal Peterson ministry, was elevated to full ministry status in June as the Ministry of Aboriginal Affairs.

After the legislature was prorogued, citizenship minister Mike Colle resigned in July following revelation of government grants that were given to immigrant and cultural groups without official applications or formal statements of purpose and were well beyond the amount sought by applicants.

==== Post Election Shuffle ====
- New Entrants: (10) Margarett Best, Aileen Carroll, Brad Duguid, Peter Fonseca, Michael Gravelle, Deb Matthews, Ted McMeekin, John Milloy, Monique Smith, John Wilkinson
- Departures: (8) 2 did not seek re-election – Marie Bountrogianni, Mary Anne Chambers; 1 defeated – Caroline Di Cocco; 1 declined to remain in cabinet – Greg Sorbara; 4 relieved of cabinet duty – Laurel Broten, Monte Kwinter, Steve Peters, David Ramsay

An extensive cabinet shuffle occurred October 30, a few weeks after the 2007 Ontario general election, in which the Liberals secured another majority with nearly identical results to the last election, winning 71 out of 107 seats.

Greg Sorbara, who was re-elected to parliament, declined to continue to serve as Minister of Finance.

Ten newly appointed cabinet ministers were brought in, including two newly elected MPPs. Only seven established cabinet ministers retained their portfolios and were not shuffled. All told, eleven established cabinet ministers changed portfolios.

There were no new ministries created in this shuffle, but one instance of ministerial reorganization:

- Ministry of Government Services was reorganized into "Ministry of Government and Consumer Services".

Thus, with this shuffle, the ministry expanded to 28 cabinet members, even as the number of ministries remained steady at 29.

=== 2008 ===
On June 20, 2008, in the wake of a controversy surrounding a wave of C. difficile infections at Ontario hospitals, George Smitherman was replaced as Minister Health and Long Term Care and swapped portfolio with Minister of Public Infrastructure Renewal David Caplan. The infrastructure ministry was also merged with the energy ministry to become the Ministry of Energy and Infrastructure, a "super-portfolio" combining two critical ministries that would become pain points for the McGuinty ministry.

A second small shuffle occurred September 18, 2008, primarily featuring the return of former Attorney General Michael Bryant to the top echelon of cabinet to be joint head of the economic development ministry with Sandra Pupatello. Pupatello was given the new title of Minister of International Trade and Investment. The stated purpose of the shuffle was to redouble effort in attracting investment to confront Ontario's sagging economy and shrinking manufacturing sector during the Great Recession. The move triggered three cascading moves, with Bryant's aboriginal affairs portfolio being given to Brad Duguid, Peter Fonseca filling Duguid's role at Labour, and Monique Smith filling Fonseca's Tourism role. Smith's revenue portfolio was fold back to the finance ministry.

2008 saw no departure and no new entrant to the McGuinty ministry. The year ended with the number of cabinet members being equal to the number of portfolios at 28, with McGuinty himself being the only minister with two portfolios (cabinet office as the premier's portfolio, and intergovernmental affairs) while cabinet chair Gerry Phillips held no portfolio.

=== 2009 ===
==== Bryant Departs ====
Ambitious high-profile minister Michael Bryant was eased out of cabinet, surrendering first his position as House Leader to his deputy Monique Smith February 4, 2009, and later stepping down as Ministry of Economic Development on May 25. He would move on to become CEO of Invest Toronto, and his vacancy would be filled by McGuinty himself in the interim. It was reported that McGuinty felt that Bryant represented a challenge to his authority.

==== Ministries Realigned ====
On June 24, 2009, a minor shuffle involving six established cabinet ministers occurred. In regards to two of the changes (among the several implemented this day), this shuffle could be considered largely an undoing of changes made in September of the previous year:

- Ministry of Economic Development and Trade was recreated, as the experiment of a separate "Ministry of Trade" and "Ministry of Economic Development" was terminated, and the ministries were reunited.
- Minister of Revenue was recreated, as it was divided from Finance.

There were also two other instances of ministerial portfolio reorganisation:

- the responsibility for forestry was moved from Ministry of Natural Resources to the renamed Ministry of Northern Development, Mines and Forestry
- the responsibility for small businesses was stripped away from the Ministry of Consumer Services and the ministry was downsized.

While several ministries thus took on new looks, there would be no new faces in the ministry.

==== Caplan, Smitherman Depart ====
The embattled Ministry of Health and Long term Care faced a serious scandal for the second year in a row.

Former Minister of Health George Smitherman was also not long for the ministry. On November 9, he resigned from his post as Minister of Energy and Infrastructure and Deputy Premier of Ontario to run for mayor of Toronto.

The number of cabinet members at the end of the year sat at 26, while the number of portfolios (including the Premiership) was steady at 28.

=== 2010 ===
==== Second Midterm shuffle, Part One ====
Days before the big mid-term cabinet shuffle January 18, 2010, Jim Watson resigned from his post as Minister of Municipal Affairs and Housing to run for mayor of Ottawa. He became the second cabinet member to resign to pursue the mayoralty of a major Ontario city; unlike Smitherman, Watson would be successful and was elected mayor of Ottawa later in the year.

There was one instance of ministerial portfolio reorganisation:

- Ministry of Tourism and Culture, created by combining Ministry of Tourism and Ministry of Culture.

The number of cabinet members remained steady at 26, while the number of portfolios (including the Premiership) fell to 27.

==== Second Midterm shuffle, Part Two ====
On August 18, the second extensive shuffle of the year occurred; such sweeping changes occurring so close together is unusual, and indicated that the McGuinty ministry was struggling.

There were two instances of ministerial portfolio reorganisation:

- Ministry of Energy and Ministry of Infrastructure were created by the division of the "Ministry of Energy and Infrastructure" into two new ministries.
- Ministry of Health Promotion was renamed "Ministry of Health Promotion and Sport.

There would not be any instance of a cabinet member stepping down in this shuffle. In the end, both the number of cabinet members and the number of portfolios (including the Premiership) swelled to 28.

The final newly appointed cabinet minister to join the McGuinty ministry was Charles Sousa, brought on December 7 to replace Peter Fonseca at Ministry of Labour, who resigned

=== 2011 ===
==== Post-election shuffle ====
The 2011 Ontario general election resulted in the loss of 17 Liberal seats, leaving McGuinty one seat shy of a majority in Parliament. Seven vacancies opened up in the McGuinty cabinet.

On October 20, McGuinty announced the new ministry lineup with 22 members. Six of the seven vacancies were filled thus: the number of established cabinet ministers holding multiple portfolios increased from one to three, and three ministries ceased to exist:

- Ministry of Revenue was again returned to Ministry of Finance (Ontario).
- Ministry of Research and Innovation was absorbed by Ministry of Economic Development and Trade to become Ministry of Economic Development and Innovation.
- Ministry of Health Promotion and Sport was eliminated.

Thus the cabinet shrunk to 22, smaller than it had been at its inception in 2003, when it had 23 cabinet members. There were 25 portfolios (including the Premiership).

=== 2012 ===
Dalton McGuinty announced his retirement as Premier October 15, pending the election of a new Liberal Party leader. He required all cabinet members entering the leadership contest to resign from ministry, and their portfolios were taken up by incumbent ministers in the final months of the McGuinty ministry.

Wynne succeeded to the Premiership February 11, 2013, and thus the McGuinty ministry came to a close. Seventeen members of the McGuinty served in the Wynne ministry, with six of them retaining charge of the portfolio held at the end of the McGuinty ministry (Jim Bradley in environment; John Gerretsen in the Ministry of Attorney General; Deb Matthews in health; Madeleine Meilleur in community safety and correctional services; Harinder Takhar in government services; Michael Chan intourism and culture), one minister resuming a previously held portfolio (Michael Gravelle in northern development and mines) and two retaining their non-portfolio responsibilities (Laurel Broten for women issues, and John Milloy as government house leader). Two further minister would resume the portfolio they held in the McGuinty ministry later on in the Wynne ministry (Brad Duguid in economic development and Bob Chiarelli in infrastructure).

== Members ==
=== Trivia ===
Madeleine Meilleur's last name is French for "best;" Margarett Best's last name is English for "meilleur."

David Caplan, in taking over as Minister of Health on June 20, 2008, holds the same position his mother Elinor held under Premier David Peterson 1987-1990.

== List of ministers ==
=== By seniority ===
served in Peterson ministry service in McGuinty ministry service in Wynne ministry (Note: timeline presents first 3 years of Wynne ministry only)
Involuntary, unplanned departure (e.g. electoral defeat, demotion, resignation due to scandal etc)

Minister	Ministerial service			Parliamentary Service		
Minister	Start	End	Timespan	1st	Electoral District	Region
Dalton McGuinty	Oct 23, 2003	Feb 11, 2013		1990	Ottawa South	East-NCR
Jim Bradley	(June 26, 1985); Oct 23, 2003	Feb 11, 2013 (June 13, 2016)		1977	St. Catharines	905-West
Monte Kwinter	(June 26, 1985); Oct 23, 2003	Oct 30, 2007		1985	York Centre	Toronto-Metro
Greg Sorbara	(June 26, 1985); Oct 23, 2003	Oct 11, 2005		1985	Vaughan—King—Aurora	905-North
Greg Sorbara	May 23, 2006	Oct 30, 2007		1985	Vaughan—King—Aurora	905-North
David Ramsay	(Sep 29, 1987); Oct 23, 2003	Oct 30, 2007		1985	Timiskaming—Cochrane	North
Gerry Phillips	(Sep 29, 1987); Oct 23, 2003	Oct 20, 2011		1987	Scarborough—Agincourt	Toronto
Joseph Cordiano	Oct 23, 2003	Sep 18, 2006		1985	York South—Weston	Toronto-Metro
Rick Bartolucci	Oct 23, 2003	Feb 11, 2013		1995	Sudbury	North
Dwight Duncan	Oct 23, 2003	Feb 11, 2013		1995	Windsor—St. Clair	Southwest
John Gerretsen	Oct 23, 2003	Feb 11, 2013 (June 24, 2014)		1995	Kingston and the Islands	East
Sandra Pupatello	Oct 23, 2003	Oct 20, 2011		1995	Windsor West	Southwest
Gerard Kennedy	Oct 23, 2003	April 5, 2006 (Note: Resigned to contest federal party leadership)		1996	Parkdale—High Park	Toronto
David Caplan	Oct 23, 2003	Oct 7, 2009		1997 (Note: first elected via a by-election)	Don Valley East	Toronto-Metro
Marie Bountrogianni	Oct 23, 2003	Oct 30, 2007		1999	Hamilton Mountain	905-West
Michael Bryant	Oct 23, 2003	May 25, 2009 (Note: resigned to become CEO of Invest Toronto)		1999	St. Paul's	Toronto
Leona Dombrowsky	Oct 23, 2003	Oct 20, 2011 (Note: defeated in 2011 general election)		1999	Hastings—Frontenac—Lennox and Addington	East
Steve Peters	Oct 23, 2003	Oct 30, 2007		1999	Elgin—Middlesex—London	Southwest
George Smitherman	Oct 23, 2003	Nov 9, 2009 (Note: resigned to contest Toronto mayoralty)		1999	Toronto Centre—Rosedale	Toronto
Chris Bentley	Oct 23, 2003	Feb 11, 2013		2003	London West	Southwest
Mary Anne Chambers	Oct 23, 2003	Oct 30, 2007		2003	Scarborough East	Toronto-Metro
Madeleine Meilleur	Oct 23, 2003	Feb 11, 2013 (June 13, 2016)		2003	Ottawa—Vanier	East-NCR
Harinder Takhar	Oct 23, 2003	Nov 27, 2012{{left| (Note: resigned to contest party leadership) (May 8, 2013)		2003	Mississauga Centre	905-West
Jim Watson	Oct 23, 2003	Jan 12, 2010 (Note: resigned to contest Ottawa mayoralty)		2003	Ottawa West—Nepean	East-NCR
Mike Colle	June 29, 2005	July 26, 2007		1995	Eglinton—Lawrence	Toronto
Laurel Broten	June 29, 2005	Oct 30, 2007		2003	Etobicoke—Lakeshore	Toronto-Metro
Laurel Broten	Oct 7, 2009	Feb 11, 2013 (July 2, 2013)		2003	Etobicoke—Lakeshore	Toronto-Metro
Donna Cansfield	Oct 11, 2005	Jan 18, 2010		2003	Etobicoke Centre	Toronto-Metro
Caroline Di Cocco	April 5, 2006	Oct 30, 2007 (Note: defeated in 2007 general election)		1999	Sarnia—Lambton	Southwest
Kathleen Wynne	Sep 18, 2006	Nov 5, 2012 (June 29, 2018)		2003	Don Valley West	Toronto
Michael Chan	Feb 21, 2007	Feb 11, 2013 (June 29, 2018)		2006	Markham—Unionville	905-North
Michael Gravelle	Oct 30, 2007	Feb 11, 2013 (June 29, 2018)		1995	Thunder Bay—Superior North	North
Ted McMeekin	Oct 30, 2007	Feb 11, 2013 (June 13, 2016)		2000	Ancaster—Dundas—Flamborough—Westdale	905-West
Brad Duguid	Oct 30, 2007	Feb 11, 2013 (Jan 17, 2018)		2003	Scarborough Centre	Toronto-Metro
Peter Fonseca	Oct 30, 2007	Dec 16, 2010		2003	Mississauga East—Cooksville	905-West
Deb Matthews	Oct 30, 2007	Feb 11, 2013 (Jan 17, 2018)		2003	London North Centre	Southwest
John Milloy	Oct 30, 2007	Feb 11, 2013 (May 2, 2014)		2003	Kitchener Centre	Southwest
Monique Smith	Oct 30, 2007	Oct 20, 2011		2003	Nipissing	North
John Wilkinson	Oct 30, 2007	Oct 20, 2011		2003	Perth—Wellington	Southwest
Margarett Best	Oct 30, 2007	Feb 11, 2013		2007	Scarborough—Guildwood	Toronto-Metro
Aileen Carroll	Oct 30, 2007	Jan 18, 2010		2007	Barrie	905-North
Linda Jeffrey	Jan 18, 2010	Feb 11, 2013 (Mar 25, 2014)		2003	Brampton—Springdale	905-West
Carol Mitchell	Jan 18, 2010	Oct 20, 2011		2003	Huron—Bruce	Southwest
Sophia Aggelonitis	Jan 18, 2010	Oct 20, 2011		2007	Hamilton Mountain	905-West
Eric Hoskins	Jan 18, 2010	Nov 13, 2012 (Feb 26, 2018)		2009	St. Paul's	Toronto
Bob Chiarelli	Aug 18, 2010	Feb 11, 2013 (June 29, 2018)		1987 (Note: resigned seat in 1997 to seek Ottawa mayoralty, return to legislature via by-election in 2010)	Ottawa West–Nepean	East-NCR
Glen Murray	Aug 18, 2010	Nov 5, 2012 (July 31, 2017)		2010	Toronto Centre	Toronto
Charles Sousa	Dec 16, 2010	Nov 13, 2012 (June 29, 2018)		2007	Mississauga South	905-West

=== By portfolio ===
Portfolio	Minister	Start	End
Central administration portfolios
Premier and President of the Council	Dalton McGuinty	Oct 23, 2003	Feb 11, 2013
Deputy Premier (Note: a designation / title, not a portfolio or an office) (Note: none designated prior to September 2006, and between November 2009 and October 2011)	George Smitherman	Sep 21, 2006	Nov 9, 2009
Deputy Premier	Dwight Duncan	Oct 20, 2011	Feb 11, 2013
Finance: After June 29, 2005, also: Chair, Management Board of Cabinet	Greg Sorbara	Oct 23, 2003	Oct 11, 2005
Finance: After June 29, 2005, also: Chair, Management Board of Cabinet	Dwight Duncan	Oct 11, 2005	May 23, 2006
Finance: After June 29, 2005, also: Chair, Management Board of Cabinet	Greg Sorbara	May 23, 2006	Oct 30, 2007
Finance: After June 29, 2005, also: Chair, Management Board of Cabinet	Dwight Duncan	Oct 30, 2007	Feb 11, 2013
Intergovernmental Affairs	Dalton McGuinty	Oct 23, 2003	June 29, 2005
Intergovernmental Affairs	Marie Bountrogianni	June 29, 2005	Oct 30, 2007
Intergovernmental Affairs	Dalton McGuinty	Oct 30, 2007	Jan 18, 2010
Intergovernmental Affairs	Monique Smith	Jan 18, 2010	Oct 20, 2011
Intergovernmental Affairs	Dalton McGuinty	Oct 20, 2011	Feb 11, 2013
Revenue	Michael Chan	Feb 21, 2007	Oct 30, 2007
Revenue	Monique Smith	Oct 30, 2007	Sep 18, 2008
Revenue	merged with Finance	Sep 18, 2008	June 24, 2009
Revenue	John Wilkinson	June 24, 2009	August 18, 2010
Revenue	Sophia Aggelonitis	August 18, 2010	Oct 20, 2011
Revenue	merged with Finance	Oct 20, 2011	Feb 11, 2013
Law enforcement and administration portfolios
Attorney General	Michael Bryant	Oct 23, 2003	Oct 30, 2007
Attorney General	Chris Bentley	Oct 30, 2007	Oct 20, 2011
Attorney General	John Gerretsen	Oct 20, 2011	Feb 11, 2013
Community Safety and Correctional Services	Monte Kwinter	Oct 23, 2003	Oct 30, 2007
Community Safety and Correctional Services	Rick Bartolucci	Oct 30, 2007	August 18, 2010
Community Safety and Correctional Services	Jim Bradley	August 18, 2010	Oct 20, 2011
Community Safety and Correctional Services	Madeleine Meilleur	Oct 20, 2011	Feb 11, 2013
Labour	Chris Bentley	Oct 23, 2003	June 29, 2005
Labour	Steve Peters	June 29, 2005	Oct 30, 2007
Labour	Brad Duguid	Oct 30, 2007	Sep 18, 2008
Labour	Peter Fonseca	Sep 18, 2008	Dec 16, 2010
Labour	Charles Sousa	Dec 16, 2010	Oct 20, 2011
Labour	Linda Jeffrey	Oct 20, 2011	Feb 11, 2013
Social development and services portfolios
Aboriginal Affairs (Note: non-portfolio responsibility until June 21, 2007 when it became a standalone portfolio): Minister Responsible for Native Affairs (to June 29, 2005); Minister Responsible for Aboriginal Affairs (June 29, 2005 to June 21, 2007)	Michael Bryant	Oct 23, 2003	June 29, 2005
Aboriginal Affairs: Minister Responsible for Native Affairs (to June 29, 2005); Minister Responsible for Aboriginal Affairs (June 29, 2005 to June 21, 2007)	David Ramsay	June 29, 2005	Oct 30, 2007
Aboriginal Affairs: Minister Responsible for Native Affairs (to June 29, 2005); Minister Responsible for Aboriginal Affairs (June 29, 2005 to June 21, 2007)	Michael Bryant	Oct 30, 2007	Sep 18, 2008
Aboriginal Affairs: Minister Responsible for Native Affairs (to June 29, 2005); Minister Responsible for Aboriginal Affairs (June 29, 2005 to June 21, 2007)	Brad Duguid	Sep 18, 2008	Jan 18, 2010
Aboriginal Affairs: Minister Responsible for Native Affairs (to June 29, 2005); Minister Responsible for Aboriginal Affairs (June 29, 2005 to June 21, 2007)	Chris Bentley	Jan 18, 2010	Oct 20, 2011
Aboriginal Affairs: Minister Responsible for Native Affairs (to June 29, 2005); Minister Responsible for Aboriginal Affairs (June 29, 2005 to June 21, 2007)	Kathleen Wynne	Oct 20, 2011	Nov 5, 2012
Aboriginal Affairs: Minister Responsible for Native Affairs (to June 29, 2005); Minister Responsible for Aboriginal Affairs (June 29, 2005 to June 21, 2007)	Chris Bentley (Note: interim)	Nov 5, 2012	Feb 11, 2013
Children and Youth Services: Children's Services (to 2004)	Marie Bountrogianni	Oct 23, 2003	June 29, 2005
Children and Youth Services: Children's Services (to 2004)	Mary Anne Chambers	June 29, 2005	Oct 30, 2007
Children and Youth Services: Children's Services (to 2004)	Deb Matthews	Oct 30, 2007	Oct 7, 2009
Children and Youth Services: Children's Services (to 2004)	Laurel Broten	Oct 7, 2009	Oct 20, 2011
Children and Youth Services: Children's Services (to 2004)	Eric Hoskins	Oct 20, 2011	Nov 13, 2012
Children and Youth Services: Children's Services (to 2004)	Laurel Broten	Nov 13, 2012	Feb 11, 2013
Citizenship and Immigration	Marie Bountrogianni	Oct 23, 2003	June 29, 2005
Citizenship and Immigration	Michael Colle	June 29, 2005	July 26, 2007
Citizenship and Immigration	Gerry Phillips	July 26, 2007	Oct 30, 2007
Citizenship and Immigration	Michael Chan	Oct 30, 2007	Jan 18, 2010
Citizenship and Immigration	Eric Hoskins	Jan 18, 2010	Oct 20, 2011
Citizenship and Immigration	Charles Sousa	Oct 20, 2011	Nov 13, 2012
Citizenship and Immigration	Michael Chan	Nov 13, 2012	Feb 11, 2013
Community and Social Services	Sandra Pupatello	Oct 23, 2003	April 5, 2006
Community and Social Services	Madeleine Meilleur	April 5, 2006	Oct 20, 2011
Community and Social Services	John Milloy	Oct 20, 2011	Feb 11, 2013
Education	Gerard Kennedy	Oct 23, 2003	April 5, 2006
Education	Sandra Pupatello	April 5, 2006	Sep 18, 2006
Education	Kathleen Wynne	Sep 18, 2006	Jan 18, 2010
Education	Leona Dombrowsky	Jan 18, 2010	Oct 20, 2011
Education	Laurel Broten	Oct 20, 2011	Feb 11, 2013
Health and Long-Term Care	George Smitherman	Oct 23, 2003	June 20, 2008
Health and Long-Term Care	David Caplan	June 20, 2008	Oct 7, 2009
Health and Long-Term Care	Deb Matthews	Oct 7, 2009	Feb 11, 2013
Health Promotion: Health Promotion and Sport (August 18, 2010 to Oct 20, 2011)	Jim Watson	June 29, 2005	Oct 30, 2007
Health Promotion: Health Promotion and Sport (August 18, 2010 to Oct 20, 2011)	Margarett Best	Oct 30, 2007	Oct 20, 2011
Training, Colleges and Universities	Mary Anne Chambers	Oct 23, 2003	June 29, 2005
Training, Colleges and Universities	Chris Bentley	June 29, 2005	Oct 30, 2007
Training, Colleges and Universities	John Milloy	Oct 30, 2007	Oct 20, 2011
Training, Colleges and Universities	Glen Murray	Oct 20, 2011	Nov 5, 2012
Training, Colleges and Universities	John Milloy	Nov 5, 2012	Feb 11, 2013
Industry and resources portfolios
Agriculture, Foods and Rural Affairs	Steve Peters	Oct 23, 2003	June 29, 2005
Agriculture, Foods and Rural Affairs	Leona Dombrowsky	June 29, 2005	Jan 18, 2010
Agriculture, Foods and Rural Affairs	Carol Mitchell	Jan 18, 2010	Oct 20, 2011
Agriculture, Foods and Rural Affairs	Ted McMeekin	Oct 20, 2011	Feb 11, 2013
Economic Development and Trade: Economic Development (from Sept 18 2008 to June 24, 2009); Economic Development and Innovation (from Oct. 2011 to Feb. 2013)	Joseph Cordiano	Oct 23, 2003	Sep 18, 2006
Economic Development and Trade: Economic Development (from Sept 18 2008 to June 24, 2009); Economic Development and Innovation (from Oct. 2011 to Feb. 2013)	Sandra Pupatello	Sep 18, 2006	Sep 18, 2008
Economic Development and Trade: Economic Development (from Sept 18 2008 to June 24, 2009); Economic Development and Innovation (from Oct. 2011 to Feb. 2013)	Michael Bryant	Sep 18, 2008	May 25, 2009
Economic Development and Trade: Economic Development (from Sept 18 2008 to June 24, 2009); Economic Development and Innovation (from Oct. 2011 to Feb. 2013)	Dalton McGuinty	May 25, 2009	June 24, 2009
Economic Development and Trade: Economic Development (from Sept 18 2008 to June 24, 2009); Economic Development and Innovation (from Oct. 2011 to Feb. 2013)	Sandra Pupatello	June 24, 2009	Oct 20, 2011
Economic Development and Trade: Economic Development (from Sept 18 2008 to June 24, 2009); Economic Development and Innovation (from Oct. 2011 to Feb. 2013)	Brad Duguid	Oct 20, 2011	Feb 11, 2013
International Trade and Investment (Note: divided from "Ministry of Economic Development and Trade" from September 18, 2008; folded back into "Ministry of Economic Development" again June 24, 2009.)	Sandra Pupatello	Sep 18, 2008	June 24, 2009
Research and Innovation (Note: became part of the economic development ministry after October 2011)	Dalton McGuinty	June 29, 2005	Oct 30, 2007
Research and Innovation	John Wilkinson	Oct 30, 2007	June 24, 2009
Research and Innovation	John Milloy	June 24, 2009	August 18, 2010
Research and Innovation	Glen Murray	August 18, 2010	Oct 20, 2011
Culture	Madeleine Meilleur	Oct 23, 2003	April 5, 2006
Culture	Caroline Di Cocco	April 5, 2006	Oct 30, 2007
Culture	Aileen Carroll	Oct 30, 2007	Jan 18, 2010
Culture	merged with Tourism	Jan 18, 2010	Feb 11, 2013
Tourism (until Jan. 18, 2010): Tourism and Culture (2010 to 2011); Tourism, Culture and Sport (from December 7, 2011)	Jim Bradley	Oct 23, 2003	Oct 30, 2007
Tourism (until Jan. 18, 2010): Tourism and Culture (2010 to 2011); Tourism, Culture and Sport (from December 7, 2011)	Peter Fonseca	Oct 30, 2007	Sep 18, 2008
Tourism (until Jan. 18, 2010): Tourism and Culture (2010 to 2011); Tourism, Culture and Sport (from December 7, 2011)	Monique Smith	Sep 18, 2008	Jan 18, 2010
Tourism (until Jan. 18, 2010): Tourism and Culture (2010 to 2011); Tourism, Culture and Sport (from December 7, 2011)	Michael Chan	Jan 18, 2010	Feb 11, 2013
Energy: Energy and Infrastructure (June 20, 2008 to August 18, 2010)	Dwight Duncan	Oct 23, 2003	Oct 11, 2005
Energy: Energy and Infrastructure (June 20, 2008 to August 18, 2010)	Donna Cansfield	Oct 11, 2005	May 23, 2006
Energy: Energy and Infrastructure (June 20, 2008 to August 18, 2010)	Dwight Duncan	May 23, 2006	Oct 30, 2007
Energy: Energy and Infrastructure (June 20, 2008 to August 18, 2010)	Gerry Phillips	Oct 30, 2007	June 20, 2008
Energy: Energy and Infrastructure (June 20, 2008 to August 18, 2010)	George Smitherman	June 20, 2008	Nov 9, 2009
Energy: Energy and Infrastructure (June 20, 2008 to August 18, 2010)	Gerry Phillips	Nov 9, 2009	Jan 18, 2010
Energy: Energy and Infrastructure (June 20, 2008 to August 18, 2010)	Brad Duguid	Jan 18, 2010	August 18, 2010
Energy: Energy and Infrastructure (June 20, 2008 to August 18, 2010)	Brad Duguid	August 18, 2010	Oct 20, 2011
Energy: Energy and Infrastructure (June 20, 2008 to August 18, 2010)	Chris Bentley	Oct 20, 2011	Feb 11, 2013
Environment	Leona Dombrowsky	Oct 23, 2003	June 29, 2005
Environment	Laurel Broten	June 29, 2005	Oct 30, 2007
Environment	John Gerretsen	Oct 30, 2007	August 18, 2010
Environment	John Wilkinson	August 18, 2010	Oct 20, 2011
Environment	Jim Bradley	Oct 20, 2011	Feb 11, 2013
Natural Resources	David Ramsay	Oct 23, 2003	Oct 30, 2007
Natural Resources	Donna Cansfield	Oct 30, 2007	Jan 18, 2010
Natural Resources	Linda Jeffrey	Jan 18, 2010	Oct 20, 2011
Natural Resources	Michael Gravelle	Oct 20, 2011	Feb 11, 2013
Northern Development and Mines: Northern Development, Mines and Forestry (June 29, 2009 to October 20, 2011)	Rick Bartolucci	Oct 23, 2003	Oct 30, 2007
Northern Development and Mines: Northern Development, Mines and Forestry (June 29, 2009 to October 20, 2011)	Michael Gravelle	Oct 30, 2007	Oct 20, 2011
Northern Development and Mines: Northern Development, Mines and Forestry (June 29, 2009 to October 20, 2011)	Rick Bartolucci	Oct 20, 2011	Feb 11, 2013
Public services and assets portfolios
Consumer Services: Consumer and Business Services (to June 29, 2005); Small Business and Entrepreneurialship (Oct 30 2007 to July 8, 2008); Small Business and Consumer Services (July 8, 2008 to June 24, 2009)	Jim Watson	Oct 23, 2003	June 29, 2005
Consumer Services: Consumer and Business Services (to June 29, 2005); Small Business and Entrepreneurialship (Oct 30 2007 to July 8, 2008); Small Business and Consumer Services (July 8, 2008 to June 24, 2009)	merged with Government Services	June 29, 2005	Oct 30, 2007
Consumer Services: Consumer and Business Services (to June 29, 2005); Small Business and Entrepreneurialship (Oct 30 2007 to July 8, 2008); Small Business and Consumer Services (July 8, 2008 to June 24, 2009)	Harinder Takhar	Oct 30, 2007	June 24, 2009
Consumer Services: Consumer and Business Services (to June 29, 2005); Small Business and Entrepreneurialship (Oct 30 2007 to July 8, 2008); Small Business and Consumer Services (July 8, 2008 to June 24, 2009)	Ted McMeekin	June 24, 2009	Jan 18, 2010
Consumer Services: Consumer and Business Services (to June 29, 2005); Small Business and Entrepreneurialship (Oct 30 2007 to July 8, 2008); Small Business and Consumer Services (July 8, 2008 to June 24, 2009)	Sophia Aggelonitis	Jan 18, 2010	August 18, 2010
Consumer Services: Consumer and Business Services (to June 29, 2005); Small Business and Entrepreneurialship (Oct 30 2007 to July 8, 2008); Small Business and Consumer Services (July 8, 2008 to June 24, 2009)	John Gerretsen	August 18, 2010	Oct 20, 2011
Consumer Services: Consumer and Business Services (to June 29, 2005); Small Business and Entrepreneurialship (Oct 30 2007 to July 8, 2008); Small Business and Consumer Services (July 8, 2008 to June 24, 2009)	Margarett Best	Oct 20, 2011	Feb 11, 2013
Government Services: Chair of the Management Board of Cabinet (prior to June 29 2005) (Note: Management Board ceases to be a ministerial portfolio on June 29, 2005 and returned to being a joint cabinet committee (with Treasury Board) of cabinet, with the Minister of Finance as chair); Consumer and Government Services (June 29 2005 to October 30, 2007)	Gerry Phillips	October 23, 2003	Oct 30, 2007
Government Services: Chair of the Management Board of Cabinet (prior to June 29 2005); Consumer and Government Services (June 29 2005 to October 30, 2007)	Ted McMeekin	Oct 30, 2007	June 24, 2009
Government Services: Chair of the Management Board of Cabinet (prior to June 29 2005); Consumer and Government Services (June 29 2005 to October 30, 2007)	Harinder Takhar	June 24, 2009	Nov 27, 2012
Government Services: Chair of the Management Board of Cabinet (prior to June 29 2005); Consumer and Government Services (June 29 2005 to October 30, 2007)	Dwight Duncan	Nov 27, 2012	Feb 11, 2013
Infrastructure	David Caplan	Oct 23, 2003	June 20, 2008
Infrastructure	merged with Energy	June 20, 2008	August 18, 2010
Infrastructure	Bob Chiarelli	August 18, 2010	Feb 11, 2013
Municipal Affairs and Housing	John Gerretsen	Oct 23, 2003	Oct 30, 2007
Municipal Affairs and Housing	Jim Watson	Oct 30, 2007	Jan 12, 2010
Municipal Affairs and Housing	John Gerretsen	Jan 12, 2010	Jan 18, 2010
Municipal Affairs and Housing	Jim Bradley	Jan 18, 2010	August 18, 2010
Municipal Affairs and Housing	Rick Bartolucci	August 18, 2010	Oct 20, 2011
Municipal Affairs and Housing	Kathleen Wynne	Oct 20, 2011	Nov 5, 2012
Municipal Affairs and Housing	Bob Chiarelli	Nov 5, 2012	Feb 11, 2013
Transportation	Harinder Takhar	Oct 23, 2003	May 23, 2006
Transportation	Donna Cansfield	May 23, 2006	Oct 30, 2007
Transportation	Jim Bradley	Oct 30, 2007	Jan 18, 2010
Transportation	Kathleen Wynne	Jan 18, 2010	Oct 20, 2011
Transportation	Bob Chiarelli	Oct 20, 2011	Feb 11, 2013
Non-portfolio assignment
Chair of Cabinet	Dwight Duncan	Oct 23, 2003	Oct 30, 2007
Chair of Cabinet	Kathleen Wynne	Oct 30, 2007	June 20, 2008
Chair of Cabinet	Gerry Phillips (Note: as a minister without portfolio except for the period between November 2009 and January 2010 when Phillips was interim energy and infrastrucutre minister following George Smitherman's departure)	June 20, 2008	Oct 20, 2011
Chair of Cabinet	Rick Bartolucci	Oct 20, 2011	Feb 11, 2013
Minister Responsible for Democratic Renewal	Michael Bryant	Oct 23, 2003	June 29, 2005
Minister Responsible for Democratic Renewal	Marie Bountrogianni	June 29, 2005	Oct 30, 2007
Minister Responsible for Francophone Affairs	Madeleine Meilleur	Oct 23, 2003	Feb 11, 2013
Minister Responsible for Seniors	John Gerretsen	Oct 23, 2003	June 29, 2005
Minister Responsible for Seniors	Jim Bradley	June 29, 2005	Oct 30, 2007
Minister Responsible for Seniors	Aileen Carroll	Oct 30, 2007	Jan 18, 2010
Minister Responsible for Seniors	Gerry Phillips	Jan 18, 2010	August 18, 2010
Minister Responsible for Seniors	Sophia Aggelonitis	August 18, 2010	Oct 20, 2011
Minister Responsible for Seniors	Linda Jeffrey	Oct 20, 2011	Feb 11, 2013
Minister Responsible for Women's Issues	Sandra Pupatello	Oct 23, 2003	Oct 30, 2007
Minister Responsible for Women's Issues	Deb Matthews	Oct 30, 2007	Oct 7, 2009
Minister Responsible for Women's Issues	Laurel Broten	Oct 7, 2009	Feb 11, 2013
Government House Leader	Dwight Duncan	Oct 23, 2003	Oct 11, 2005
Government House Leader	Jim Bradley	Oct 11, 2005	Sep 10, 2007
Government House Leader	Michael Bryant	Sep 10, 2007	Feb 4, 2009
Government House Leader	Monique Smith	Feb 4, 2009	Sep 7, 2011
Government House Leader	John Milloy	Oct 20, 2011	Feb 11, 2013
Deputy Government House Leader	David Caplan	Oct 23, 2003	Sep 10, 2007
Deputy Government House Leader	David Caplan	Oct 30, 2007	June 20, 2008
Deputy Government House Leader	Monique Smith	June 20, 2008	Feb 4, 2009
Deputy Government House Leader	Brad Duguid	Feb 4, 2009	Feb 12, 2010
Deputy Government House Leader	Gerry Phillips	Feb 12, 2010	Sep 7, 2011
Deputy Government House Leader	Jim Bradley	Oct 21, 2011	Feb 11, 2013
