= Results of the 2021 Canadian federal election by riding =

Candidates of the 2021 Canadian federal election
- September 20, 2021

Canadian regions

The following is the individual results for the 2021 Canadian federal election. Following the 2019 election a minority government was formed, increasing the likelihood of an early election call.

Candidates could begin registering with Elections Canada on 17 August; registration closed at 2 p.m. local time on 30 August. The official list of candidates was available on 1 September.

Deputy returning officers report their results to the returning office by phone on election night, then submit written statements. Special ballots (including but not limited to mail-in voting) are counted at each district's returning office beginning the day after the election. Returning officers have seven days to validate the written statement of the deputy returning officer for each poll; most ridings are validated within a week of voting but ridings with remote communities often take longer, with Nunavut taking 17 days in 2021. Six days after completing the validations, the returning officer declares the winner by signing and returning the writ to the Chief Electoral Officer. Ridings undergoing a judicial recount are not subject to the six-day time limit for returning the writ.

== Abbreviations guide ==
- Animal – Animal Protection Party of Canada
- BQ – Bloc Québécois
- Cent. – Centrist Party of Canada
- CFF – Canada's Fourth Front (Note: Shortly after the election the party changed its name to CFF - Direct Democracy Party.)
- CHP – Christian Heritage Party of Canada
- CNP – Canadian Nationalist Party
- Comm. – Communist Party of Canada
- Conservative – Conservative Party of Canada
- FPC – Free Party Canada
- Green – Green Party of Canada
- Ind. – Independent
- Liberal – Liberal Party of Canada
- Libert. – Libertarian Party of Canada
- Mar. – Marijuana Party
- Mav. – Maverick Party
- M-L – Marxist–Leninist Party of Canada
- NA – No Affiliation (Note: No Affiliation is used by Elections Canada when a candidate leaves the Party Affiliation entry blank on his or her registration; this is generally done by candidates from registered parties who have been ejected and candidates from parties that have never been registered.)
- NCA – National Citizens Alliance of Canada
- NDP – New Democratic Party
- Pat. – Parti Patriote
- PIQ – Parti pour l'Indépendance du Québec
- PPC – People's Party of Canada
- Rhino. – Parti Rhinocéros Party
- unreg. – Party not yet eligible for registration with Elections Canada
- VCP – Veterans Coalition Party of Canada

== Candidates and results ==
Candidates' names are as registered with Elections Canada.
Vote totals are those validated by Elections Canada; media coverage is usually based on preliminary totals and often differs from the final numbers.

† = not seeking re-election
‡ = running for re-election in different riding
§ = represents that the incumbent was refused nomination by their party
$ = represents that the incumbent was announced as nominated by their party but later chose to retire
# = represents that the incumbent was announced as nominated by their party but later lost that party's nomination through expulsion from caucus
bold indicates party leader

=== Newfoundland and Labrador ===
Electoral district	Candidates				Incumbent
Electoral district	Liberal	Conservative	NDP	PPC	Incumbent
Avalon	Ken McDonald; 18,608; 50.10%	Matthew Chapman; 12,738; 34.29%	Carolyn Davis; 5,151; 13.87%	Lainie Stewart; 647; 1.74%	Ken McDonald
Bonavista—Burin—Trinity	Churence Rogers; 13,972; 46.59%	Sharon Vokey; 12,278; 40.94%	Anne Marie Anonsen; 2,484; 8.28%	Linda Hogan; 1,257; 4.19%	Churence Rogers
Coast of Bays—Central—Notre Dame	Scott Simms; 14,646; 46.01%	Clifford Small; 14,927; 46.89%	Jamie Ruby; 2,261; 7.10%		Scott Simms
Labrador	Yvonne Jones; 4,119; 42.67%	Shane Dumaresque; 2,930; 30.35%	Amy Norman; 2,297; 23.80%	Shannon Champion; 307; 3.18%	Yvonne Jones
Long Range Mountains	Gudie Hutchings; 16,178; 44.39%	Carol Anstey; 14,344; 39.36%	Kaila Mintz; 4,347; 11.93%	Darrell Shelley; 1,578; 4.33%	Gudie Hutchings
St. John's East	Joanne Thompson; 17,239; 45.16%	Glenn Etchegary; 7,119; 18.65%	Mary Shortall; 13,090; 34.29%	Dana Metcalfe; 723; 1.89%	Jack Harris†
St. John's South—Mount Pearl	Seamus O'Regan; 19,478; 56.17%	Steve Hodder; 6,447; 18.59%	Ray Critch; 8,113; 23.40%	Georgia Faith Stewart; 638; 1.84%	Seamus O'Regan

=== Nova Scotia ===
Electoral district	Candidates						Incumbent
Electoral district	Liberal	Conservative	NDP	Green	PPC	Other	Incumbent
Cape Breton—Canso	Mike Kelloway; 18,288; 46.46%	Fiona MacLeod; 13,805; 35.07%	Jana Reddick; 5,618; 14.27%		Brad Grandy; 1,649; 4.19%		Mike Kelloway
Central Nova	Sean Fraser; 18,682; 46.16%	Steven Cotter; 13,060; 32.27%	Betsy MacDonald; 6,225; 15.38%	Katerina Nikas; 494; 1.22%	Al Muir; 1,445; 3.57%	Chris Frazer (Comm.); 138 0.34%	Sean Fraser
Central Nova	Sean Fraser; 18,682; 46.16%	Steven Cotter; 13,060; 32.27%	Betsy MacDonald; 6,225; 15.38%	Katerina Nikas; 494; 1.22%	Al Muir; 1,445; 3.57%	Harvey Henderson (Ind.); 365 0.90%	Sean Fraser
Central Nova	Sean Fraser; 18,682; 46.16%	Steven Cotter; 13,060; 32.27%	Betsy MacDonald; 6,225; 15.38%	Katerina Nikas; 494; 1.22%	Al Muir; 1,445; 3.57%	Ryan Smyth (Rhino.); 65 0.16%	Sean Fraser
Cumberland—Colchester	Lenore Zann; 13,822; 34.20%	Stephen Ellis; 18,601; 46.02%	Daniel Osborne (Note: Candidate stopped campaigning or was disavowed by party after candidate registration ended and remained on ballot.); 4,984; 12.33%	Jillian Foster; 1,045; 2.59%	Bill Archer; 1,687; 4.17%	Jody O'Blenis (Ind.); 278; 0.69%	Lenore Zann
Dartmouth—Cole Harbour	Darren Fisher; 24,209; 53.06%	(Note: Troy Myers registered as Conservative candidate in Dartmouth—Cole Harbour but withdrew before the registration period ended to deal with a criminal allegation.)	Kevin Payne; 15,267; 33.46%	Rana Zaman; 1,371; 3.00%	Michelle Lindsay; 4,781; 10.48%		Darren Fisher
Halifax	Andy Fillmore; 21,905; 42.74%	Cameron Ells; 6,601; 12.88%	Lisa Roberts; 20,347; 39.70%	Jo-Ann Roberts; 1,128; 2.20%	B. Alexander Hébert; 1,069; 2.09%	Katie Campbell (Comm.); 198; 0.39%	Andy Fillmore
Halifax West	Lena Metlege Diab; 24,744; 48.49%	Eleanor Humphries; 11,243; 22.03%	Jonathan Keith Roberts; 12,331; 24.16%	Richard Zurawski; 1,181; 2.31%	Julie Scott; 1,447; 2.84%	Kevin Schulthies (CHP); 85; 0.17%	Geoff Regan†
Kings—Hants	Kody Blois; 20,192; 44.92%	Mark Parent; 13,234; 29.44%	Stephen Schneider; 8,645; 19.23%	Sheila G. Richardson; 940; 2.09%	Steven Ford; 1,945; 4.33%		Kody Blois
Sackville—Preston—Chezzetcook	Darrell Samson; 18,838; 41.31%	Angela Conrad; 12,047; 26.42%	Jenna Chisholm; 12,012; 26.34%	Anthony Edmonds; 933; 2.05%	Earl Gosse; 1,776; 3.89%		Darrell Samson
South Shore—St. Margarets	Bernadette Jordan; 18,575; 37.15%	Rick Perkins; 20,454; 40.90%	Olivia Dorey; 9,541; 19.08%	Thomas Trappenberg; 1,434; 2.87%			Bernadette Jordan
Sydney—Victoria	Jaime Battiste; 14,250; 39.24%	Eddie Orrell; 13,166; 36.26%	Jeff Ward; 7,217; 19.87%	Mark Embrett; 376; 1.04%	Ronald Angus Barron; 1,176; 3.24%	Nikki Boisvert (M-L); 127; 0.35%	Jaime Battiste
West Nova	Alxys Chamberlain; 13,732; 31.30%	Chris d'Entremont; 22,104; 50.38%	Cheryl Burbidge; 5,645; 12.87%		Scott Spidle; 2,390; 5.45%		Chris d'Entremont

=== Prince Edward Island ===
Electoral district	Candidates						Incumbent
Electoral district	Liberal	Conservative	NDP	Green	PPC	Christian Heritage	Incumbent
Cardigan	Lawrence MacAulay; 11,175; 50.58%	Wayne Phelan; 6,817; 30.85%	Lynne Thiele; 2,168; 9.81%	Michael MacLean; 1,064; 4.82%	Kevin Hardy; 725; 3.28%	Fred MacLeod; 145; 0.66%	Lawrence MacAulay
Charlottetown	Sean Casey; 8,919; 46.70%	Doug Currie; 5,932; 31.06%	Margaret Andrade; 2,048; 10.72%	Darcie Lanthier; 1,832; 9.59%	Scott McPhee; 369; 1.93%		Sean Casey
Egmont	Bobby Morrissey; 9,040; 46.21%	Barry Balsom; 6,088; 31.12%	Lisa Bradshaw; 1,688; 8.63%	Alex Clark; 1,771; 9.05%	Wayne Biggar; 974; 4.98%		Bobby Morrissey
Malpeque	Heath MacDonald; 9,912; 41.81%	Jody Sanderson; 7,836; 33.05%	Michelle Neill; 1,898; 8.01%	Anna Keenan; 3,381; 14.26%	Christopher Landry; 680; 2.87%		Wayne Easter†

=== New Brunswick ===
Electoral district	Candidates						Incumbent
Electoral district	Liberal	Conservative	NDP	Green	PPC	Other	Incumbent
Acadie—Bathurst	Serge Cormier; 27,817; 64.81%	Jean-Paul Lanteigne; 5,916; 13.78%	Mélissa Hébert; 4,906; 11.43%	Rachel Johns; 1,203; 2.80%	Kenneth Edward Langford; 2,531; 5.90%	Richer Doiron (FPC); 549; 1.28%	Serge Cormier
Beauséjour	Dominic LeBlanc; 27,313; 55.58%	Shelly Mitchell; 9,526; 19.38%	Evelyne Godfrey; 5,394; 10.98%	Stella Anna Girouard; 2,798; 5.69%	Jack Minor; 3,723; 7.58%	Isabelle Sauriol Chiasson (FPC); 391; 0.80%	Dominic LeBlanc
Fredericton	Jenica Atwin; 16,316; 37.03%	Andrea Johnson; 15,814; 35.89%	Shawn Oldenburg; 5,564; 12.63%	Nicole O'Byrne; 5,666; 12.86%		Brandon Kirby (Libert.); 234 0.53%	Jenica Atwin (Note: Atwin was announced as the Green candidate in April but crossed the floor to the Liberals in June.)
Fredericton	Jenica Atwin; 16,316; 37.03%	Andrea Johnson; 15,814; 35.89%	Shawn Oldenburg; 5,564; 12.63%	Nicole O'Byrne; 5,666; 12.86%		June Patterson (Comm.); 158 0.36%	Jenica Atwin
Fredericton	Jenica Atwin; 16,316; 37.03%	Andrea Johnson; 15,814; 35.89%	Shawn Oldenburg; 5,564; 12.63%	Nicole O'Byrne; 5,666; 12.86%		Jen Smith (Ind.); 310 0.70%	Jenica Atwin
Fundy Royal	Whitney Dykeman; 11,075; 24.95%	Rob Moore; 21,460; 48.35%	Josh Floyd; 6,211; 13.99%	Tim Thompson; 2,189; 4.93%	Wayne Wheeler; 3,447; 7.77%		Rob Moore
Madawaska—Restigouche	René Arseneault; 16,854; 55.18%	Shawn Beaulieu; 7,892; 25.84%	Elizabeth MacDonald; 1,848; 6.05%	Rebecca Blaevoet; 786; 2.57%	Nancy Mercier; 1,889; 6.18%	Louis Berube (FPC); 1,277; 4.18%	René Arseneault
Miramichi—Grand Lake	Lisa Harris; 12,762; 39.26%	Jake Stewart; 14,218; 43.74%	Bruce Potter; 2,291; 7.05%	Patty Deitch; 1,393; 4.29%	Ron Nowlan; 1,839; 5.66%		Pat Finnigan$
Moncton—Riverview—Dieppe	Ginette Petitpas Taylor; 22,460; 49.08%	Darlene Smith; 10,692; 23.36%	Serge Landry; 7,774; 16.99%	Richard Dunn; 1,935; 4.23%	Lorilee Carrier; 2,901; 6.34%		Ginette Petitpas Taylor
New Brunswick Southwest	Jason Hickey; 8,750; 23.89%	John Williamson; 18,309; 49.98%	Richard Trevor Warren; 4,893; 13.36%	John Reist; 1,587; 4.33%	Meryl Sarty; 3,090; 8.44%		John Williamson
Saint John—Rothesay	Wayne Long; 17,375; 46.40%	Mel Norton; 12,315; 32.88%	Don Paulin; 4,816; 12.86%	Ann McAllister; 948; 2.53%	Nicholas Pereira; 1,996; 5.33%		Wayne Long
Tobique—Mactaquac	Cully Robinson; 8,223; 23.90%	Richard Bragdon; 17,536; 50.98%	Meriet Gray Miller; 3,656; 10.63%	Anthony Martin; 1,657; 4.82%	Daniel Joseph Waggoner; 2,930; 8.52%	Steven J LaForest (Ind.); 398; 1.16%	Richard Bragdon

=== Quebec ===
==== Eastern Quebec ====
Electoral district	Candidates							Incumbent
Electoral district	Liberal	Conservative	BQ	NDP	PPC	FPC	Other	Incumbent
Avignon—La Mitis—Matane—Matapédia	Louis-Éric Savoie; 7,095; 21.45%	Germain Dumas; 2,912; 8.80%	Kristina Michaud; 19,776; 59.79%	Christel Marchand; 1,501; 4.54%	Eric Barnabé; 965; 2.92%	Mélanie Gendron; 826; 2.50%		Kristina Michaud
Bellechasse—Les Etchemins—Lévis	Daniel Vaillancourt; 10,074; 15.94%	Dominique Vien; 32,238; 51.02%	Marie-Christine Richard; 14,669; 23.22%	Marie-Philippe Gagnon Gauthier; 3,184; 5.04%		Raymond Arcand; 1,793; 2.84%	Chamroeun Khuon (Ind.); 306 0.48%	Steven Blaney$
Bellechasse—Les Etchemins—Lévis	Daniel Vaillancourt; 10,074; 15.94%	Dominique Vien; 32,238; 51.02%	Marie-Christine Richard; 14,669; 23.22%	Marie-Philippe Gagnon Gauthier; 3,184; 5.04%		Raymond Arcand; 1,793; 2.84%	Hélène Lefebvre (Green); 918 1.45%	Steven Blaney$
Gaspésie—Les Îles-de-la-Madeleine	Diane Lebouthillier; 17,099; 46.39%	Jean-Pierre Pigeon; 3,010; 8.17%	Guy Bernatchez; 14,481; 39.29%	Lisa Phung; 1,358; 3.68%	Christian Rioux; 621; 1.68%	Monique Leduc; 289; 0.78%		Diane Lebouthillier
Montmagny—L'Islet—Kamouraska—Rivière-du-Loup	François Lapointe; 8,361; 17.49%	Bernard Généreux; 24,118; 50.44%	Simon Bérubé; 12,550; 26.25%	Sean English; 1,597; 3.34%		Nancy Rochon; 917; 1.92%	Thibaud Mony (Rhino.); 269; 0.56%	Bernard Généreux
Rimouski-Neigette—Témiscouata—Les Basques	Léonie Lajoie; 10,482; 24.88%	France Gagnon; 5,569; 13.22%	Maxime Blanchette-Joncas; 20,657; 49.02%	Sylvain Lajoie; 2,641; 6.27%	Jean Tardy; 700; 1.66%	Michel Raymond; 430; 1.02%	Noémi Bureau-Civil (Ind.); 1,467 3.48%	Maxime Blanchette-Joncas
Rimouski-Neigette—Témiscouata—Les Basques	Léonie Lajoie; 10,482; 24.88%	France Gagnon; 5,569; 13.22%	Maxime Blanchette-Joncas; 20,657; 49.02%	Sylvain Lajoie; 2,641; 6.27%	Jean Tardy; 700; 1.66%	Michel Raymond; 430; 1.02%	Megan Hodges (Rhino.); 192 0.46%	Maxime Blanchette-Joncas

==== Côte-Nord and Saguenay ====
Electoral district	Candidates						Incumbent
Electoral district	Liberal	Conservative	BQ	NDP	Green	Other	Incumbent
Beauport—Côte-de-Beaupré—Île d'Orléans—Charlevoix	Alexandra Bernier; 10,365; 20.67%	Véronique Laprise; 15,969; 31.85%	Caroline Desbiens; 19,270; 38.44%	Frédéric Du Verle; 2,242; 4.47%	Frédéric Amyot; 733; 1.46%	Chantal Laplante (FPC); 449 0.90%	Caroline Desbiens
Beauport—Côte-de-Beaupré—Île d'Orléans—Charlevoix	Alexandra Bernier; 10,365; 20.67%	Véronique Laprise; 15,969; 31.85%	Caroline Desbiens; 19,270; 38.44%	Frédéric Du Verle; 2,242; 4.47%	Frédéric Amyot; 733; 1.46%	Jenniefer Lefrançois (PPC); 881 1.76%	Caroline Desbiens
Beauport—Côte-de-Beaupré—Île d'Orléans—Charlevoix	Alexandra Bernier; 10,365; 20.67%	Véronique Laprise; 15,969; 31.85%	Caroline Desbiens; 19,270; 38.44%	Frédéric Du Verle; 2,242; 4.47%	Frédéric Amyot; 733; 1.46%	Vicky Lépine (Ind.); 227 0.45%	Caroline Desbiens
Chicoutimi—Le Fjord	Jean Duplain; 7,676; 18.27%	Richard Martel; 17,228; 41.01%	Julie Bouchard; 14,027; 33.39%	Ismaël Raymond; 1,944; 4.63%	Yves Laporte; 482; 1.15%	Jimmy Voyer (PPC); 649; 1.55%	Richard Martel
Jonquière	Stéphane Bégin; 9,546; 20.99%	Louise Gravel; 13,223; 29.08%	Mario Simard; 19,036; 41.86%	Marieve Ruel; 2,559; 5.63%	Marie-Josée Yelle; 738; 1.62%	Line Bélanger (Rhino.); 372; 0.82%	Mario Simard
Lac-Saint-Jean	Marjolaine Étienne; 9,371; 18.67%	Serge Bergeron; 12,899; 25.70%	Alexis Brunelle-Duceppe; 25,466; 50.73%	Mathieu Chambers; 1,637; 3.26%	Annie Thibault; 824; 1.64%		Alexis Brunelle-Duceppe
Manicouagan	Thomas Gagné; 6,545; 18.70%	Rodrigue Vigneault; 7,640; 21.83%	Marilène Gill; 18,419; 52.63%	Nichola St-Jean; 1,509; 4.31%		Bianca Girard (FPC); 887; 2.53%	Marilène Gill

==== Quebec City ====
Electoral district	Candidates								Incumbent
Electoral district	Liberal	Conservative	BQ	NDP	Green	PPC	FPC	Other	Incumbent
Beauport—Limoilou	Ann Gingras; 12,378; 25.45%	Alupa Clarke; 14,164; 29.12%	Julie Vignola; 15,146; 31.14%	Camille Esther Garon; 5,075; 10.43%	Dalila Elhak; 1,025; 2.11%		Lyne Verret; 737; 1.52%	Claude Moreau (M-L); 119; 0.24%	Julie Vignola
Charlesbourg—Haute-Saint-Charles	René-Paul Coly; 11,326; 19.75%	Pierre Paul-Hus; 25,623; 44.68%	Marie-Christine Lamontagne; 14,237; 24.83%	Michel Marc Lacroix; 3,446; 6.01%	Jacques Palardy-Dion; 972; 1.69%	Wayne Cyr; 1,296; 2.26%	Daniel Pelletier; 449; 0.78%		Pierre Paul-Hus
Louis-Hébert	Joël Lightbound; 22,933; 38.35%	Gilles Lépine; 14,332; 23.97%	Marc Dean; 16,247; 27.17%	Hamid Nadji; 4,337; 7.25%	Denis Blanchette; 1,573; 2.63%			Ali Dahan (Ind.); 378; 0.63%	Joël Lightbound
Louis-Saint-Laurent	Nathanielle Morin; 11,228; 17.52%	Gérard Deltell; 33,098; 51.64%	Thierry Bilodeau; 13,069; 20.39%	Yu-Ti Eva Huang; 3,370; 5.26%	Daniel Chicoine; 907; 1.42%	Guillaume Côté; 1,337; 2.09%	Mélanie Fortin; 1,089; 1.70%		Gérard Deltell
Québec	Jean-Yves Duclos; 18,132; 35.42%	Bianca Boutin; 9,239; 18.05%	Louis Sansfaçon; 14,824; 28.96%	Tommy Bureau; 6,652; 12.99%	Patrick Kerr; 1,182; 2.31%	Daniel Brisson; 855; 1.67%	Karine Simard; 307; 0.60%		Jean-Yves Duclos

==== Central Quebec ====
Electoral district	Candidates								Incumbent
Electoral district	Liberal	Conservative	BQ	NDP	Green	PPC	FPC	Other	Incumbent
Bécancour—Nicolet—Saurel	Nathalie Rochefort; 8,451; 16.90%	Yanick Caisse; 8,404; 16.81%	Louis Plamondon; 27,403; 54.80%	Catherine Gauvin; 2,550; 5.10%	David Turcotte; 770; 1.54%	Eric Pettersen; 1,214; 2.43%	André Blanchette; 1,215; 2.43%		Louis Plamondon
Berthier—Maskinongé	Alexandre Bellemare; 8,403; 15.29%	Léo Soulières; 6,007; 10.93%	Yves Perron; 19,339; 35.20%	Ruth Ellen Brosseau; 18,402; 33.49%	Laurence Requilé; 548; 1.00%	Geneviève Sénécal; 1,496; 2.72%	Denis Brown; 551; 1.00%	Steven Lamirande (Mar.); 199; 0.36%	Yves Perron
Joliette	Michel Bourgeois; 12,731; 22.65%	Roger Materne; 5,314; 9.46%	Gabriel Ste-Marie; 30,913; 55.01%	Alexis Beaudet; 3,100; 5.52%	Érica Poirier; 1,126; 2.00%	Maxime Leclerc; 1,771; 3.15%	Manon Coutu; 992; 1.77%	Yanick Théoret (Mar.); 251; 0.45%	Gabriel Ste-Marie
Lévis—Lotbinière	Ghislain Daigle; 9,286; 14.65%	Jacques Gourde; 32,731; 51.62%	Samuel Lamarche; 13,740; 21.67%	Guylaine Dumont; 4,497; 7.09%	Charles-Eugène Bergeron; 856; 1.35%	Benoit Simard; 1,661; 2.62%	Mariève Lemay; 541; 0.85%	**Carl Brochu** (Pat.); 95; 0.15%	Jacques Gourde
Montcalm	Javeria Qureshi; 10,196; 19.82%	Gisèle Desroches; 6,011; 11.68%	Luc Thériault; 27,378; 53.21%	Oulai B. Goué; 3,218; 6.25%	Mathieu Goyette; 1,317; 2.56%	Bruno Beaudry; 2,258; 4.39%	Robert Bellerose; 1,074; 2.09%		Luc Thériault
Portneuf—Jacques-Cartier	Sani Diallo; 10,068; 15.44%	Joël Godin; 33,657; 51.61%	Christian Hébert; 15,525; 23.81%	David-Roger Gagnon; 3,223; 4.94%		Nash Mathieu; 1,615; 2.48%	Charles Fiset; 638; 0.98%	Tommy Pelletier (Rhino.); 490; 0.75%	Joël Godin
Repentigny	Yvelie Kernizan; 16,500; 27.64%	Pascal Bapfou Vozang Siewe; 5,328; 8.92%	Monique Pauzé; 30,848; 51.67%	Naomie Mathieu Chauvette; 4,484; 7.51%			Pierre Duval; 2,025; 3.39%	Micheline Boucher Granger (PIQ); 516; 0.86%	Monique Pauzé
Saint-Maurice—Champlain	François-Philippe Champagne; 23,913; 42.45%	Jacques Bouchard; 10,139; 18.00%	Jacynthe Bruneau; 16,940; 30.07%	Valérie Bergeron; 2,849; 5.06%	Marie-Claude Gaudet; 731; 1.30%		Marie Gabrielle Rouleau; 932; 1.65%	Hugo Beaumont Tremblay (Mar.); 307 0.54%	François-Philippe Champagne
Saint-Maurice—Champlain	François-Philippe Champagne; 23,913; 42.45%	Jacques Bouchard; 10,139; 18.00%	Jacynthe Bruneau; 16,940; 30.07%	Valérie Bergeron; 2,849; 5.06%	Marie-Claude Gaudet; 731; 1.30%		Marie Gabrielle Rouleau; 932; 1.65%	Dji-Pé Frazer (Rhino.); 285 0.51%	François-Philippe Champagne
Saint-Maurice—Champlain	François-Philippe Champagne; 23,913; 42.45%	Jacques Bouchard; 10,139; 18.00%	Jacynthe Bruneau; 16,940; 30.07%	Valérie Bergeron; 2,849; 5.06%	Marie-Claude Gaudet; 731; 1.30%		Marie Gabrielle Rouleau; 932; 1.65%	Alain Magnan (Ind.); 241 0.43%	François-Philippe Champagne
Trois-Rivières (judicial recount result)	Martin Francoeur; 16,637; 28.63%	Yves Levesque; 17,053; 29.35%	René Villemure; 17,136; 29.49%	Adis Simidzija; 4,680; 8.05%	Andrew Holman; 754; 1.30%	Jean Landry; 1,115; 1.92%	Gilles Brodeur; 735; 1.26%		Louise Charbonneau†

==== Eastern Townships ====
Electoral district	Candidates								Incumbent
Electoral district	Liberal	Conservative	BQ	NDP	Green	PPC	FPC	Other	Incumbent
Beauce	Philippe-Alexandre Langlois; 7,018; 12.32%	Richard Lehoux; 27,514; 48.29%	Solange Thibodeau; 8,644; 15.17%	François Jacques-Côté; 1,654; 2.90%	Andrzej Wisniowski; 486; 0.85%	**Maxime Bernier**; 10,362; 18.19%	Chantale Giguère; 1,096; 1.92%	Sébastien Tanguay (Mar.); 206; 0.36%	Richard Lehoux
Brome—Missisquoi (judicial recount terminated)	Pascale St-Onge; 21,488; 34.96%	Vincent Duhamel; 9,961; 16.20%	Marilou Alarie; 21,291; 34.64%	Andrew Panton; 3,828; 6.23%	Michelle Corcos; 1,466; 2.38%	Alexis Stogowski; 1,982; 3.22%	Maryse Richard; 961; 1.56%	Lawrence Cotton (VCP); 216 0.35%	Lyne Bessette$
Brome—Missisquoi (judicial recount terminated)	Pascale St-Onge; 21,488; 34.96%	Vincent Duhamel; 9,961; 16.20%	Marilou Alarie; 21,291; 34.64%	Andrew Panton; 3,828; 6.23%	Michelle Corcos; 1,466; 2.38%	Alexis Stogowski; 1,982; 3.22%	Maryse Richard; 961; 1.56%	Dany Desjardins (Ind.); 145 0.24%	Lyne Bessette$
Brome—Missisquoi (judicial recount terminated)	Pascale St-Onge; 21,488; 34.96%	Vincent Duhamel; 9,961; 16.20%	Marilou Alarie; 21,291; 34.64%	Andrew Panton; 3,828; 6.23%	Michelle Corcos; 1,466; 2.38%	Alexis Stogowski; 1,982; 3.22%	Maryse Richard; 961; 1.56%	Susanne Lefebvre (CHP); 133 0.22%	Lyne Bessette$
Compton—Stanstead	Marie-Claude Bibeau; 21,188; 36.66%	Pierre Tremblay; 10,087; 17.45%	Nathalie Bresse; 17,681; 30.59%	Geneva Allen; 4,288; 7.42%	Sylvain Dodier; 1,623; 2.81%	Yves Bourassa; 2,167; 3.75%	Déitane Gendron; 576; 1.00%	Sylvain Longpré (Ind.); 186; 0.32%	Marie-Claude Bibeau
Drummond	Mustapha Berri; 9,614; 18.78%	Nathalie Clermont; 9,179; 17.93%	Martin Champoux; 23,866; 46.62%	François Choquette; 5,709; 11.15%			Josée Joyal; 1,728; 3.38%	Sylvain Marcoux (NA); 419 0.82%	Martin Champoux
Drummond	Mustapha Berri; 9,614; 18.78%	Nathalie Clermont; 9,179; 17.93%	Martin Champoux; 23,866; 46.62%	François Choquette; 5,709; 11.15%			Josée Joyal; 1,728; 3.38%	Lucas Munger (Animal); 674 1.32%	Martin Champoux
Mégantic—L'Érable	Adam Lukofsky; 6,329; 13.63%	Luc Berthold; 26,121; 56.26%	Éric Labonté; 9,318; 20.07%	Mathieu Boisvert; 1,308; 2.82%	Emilie Hamel; 592; 1.28%	Jonathan Gagnon; 1,677; 3.61%	Real Pepin; 680; 1.46%	Gloriane Blais (Ind.); 403; 0.87%	Luc Berthold
Richmond—Arthabaska	Alexandre Desmarais; 8,543; 14.95%	Alain Rayes; 28,513; 49.88%	Diego Scalzo; 14,150; 24.76%	Nataël Bureau; 2,550; 4.46%		Nadine Fougeron; 2,058; 3.60%	Louis Richard; 897; 1.57%	Marjolaine Delisle (Rhino.); 448; 0.78%	Alain Rayes
Saint-Hyacinthe—Bagot	Caroline-Joan Boucher; 12,030; 22.68%	André Lepage; 7,166; 13.51%	Simon-Pierre Savard-Tremblay; 25,165; 47.45%	Brigitte Sansoucy; 6,170; 11.63%		Sylvain Pariseau; 1,445; 2.72%	Sébastien Desautels; 1,055; 1.99%		Simon-Pierre Savard-Tremblay
Shefford	Pierre Breton; 19,968; 33.49%	Céline Lalancette; 7,234; 12.13%	Andréanne Larouche; 24,997; 41.92%	Patrick Jasmin; 3,173; 5.32%	Mathieu Morin; 1,059; 1.78%	Gerda Schieder; 2,073; 3.48%	Joël Lacroix; 599; 1.00%	Jean-Philippe Beaudry-Graham (PIQ); 239 0.40%	Andréanne Larouche
Shefford	Pierre Breton; 19,968; 33.49%	Céline Lalancette; 7,234; 12.13%	Andréanne Larouche; 24,997; 41.92%	Patrick Jasmin; 3,173; 5.32%	Mathieu Morin; 1,059; 1.78%	Gerda Schieder; 2,073; 3.48%	Joël Lacroix; 599; 1.00%	Yannick Brisebois (Mar.); 284 0.48%	Andréanne Larouche
Sherbrooke	Élisabeth Brière; 21,830; 37.52%	Andrea Winters; 7,490; 12.87%	Ensaf Haidar; 16,848; 28.96%	Marika Lalime; 8,107; 13.93%	Marie-Clarisse Berger; 1,670; 2.87%	Marcela Niculescu; 1,453; 2.50%	Maxime Boivin; 787; 1.35%		Élisabeth Brière

==== Montérégie ====
Electoral district	Candidates								Incumbent
Electoral district	Liberal	Conservative	BQ	NDP	Green	PPC	FPC	Other	Incumbent
Beloeil—Chambly	Marie-Chantal Hamel; 15,502; 23.73%	Stéphane Robichaud; 5,661; 8.67%	**Yves-François Blanchet**; 34,678; 53.09%	Marie-Josée Béliveau; 5,524; 8.46%	Fabrice Gélinas Larrain; 1,294; 1.98%	Danila Ejov; 1,316; 2.01%	Mario Grimard; 810; 1.24%	**Michel Blondin** (PIQ); 163 0.25%	**Yves-Francois Blanchet**
Beloeil—Chambly	Marie-Chantal Hamel; 15,502; 23.73%	Stéphane Robichaud; 5,661; 8.67%	**Yves-François Blanchet**; 34,678; 53.09%	Marie-Josée Béliveau; 5,524; 8.46%	Fabrice Gélinas Larrain; 1,294; 1.98%	Danila Ejov; 1,316; 2.01%	Mario Grimard; 810; 1.24%	Thomas Thibault-Vincent (Rhino.); 185 0.28%	**Yves-Francois Blanchet**
Beloeil—Chambly	Marie-Chantal Hamel; 15,502; 23.73%	Stéphane Robichaud; 5,661; 8.67%	**Yves-François Blanchet**; 34,678; 53.09%	Marie-Josée Béliveau; 5,524; 8.46%	Fabrice Gélinas Larrain; 1,294; 1.98%	Danila Ejov; 1,316; 2.01%	Mario Grimard; 810; 1.24%	Benjamin Vachon (Mar.); 191 0.29%	**Yves-Francois Blanchet**
Brossard—Saint-Lambert	Alexandra Mendès; 28,326; 54.10%	Marcos Alves; 6,276; 11.99%	Marie-Laurence Desgagné; 10,441; 19.94%	Marc Audet; 5,442; 10.39%		Brenda Ross; 1,288; 2.46%	Engineer-Ingénieur Hu; 583; 1.11%		Alexandra Mendès
Châteauguay—Lacolle (judicial recount result)	Brenda Shanahan; 18,029; 37.03%	Pierre Bournaki; 5,538; 11.38%	Patrick O'Hara; 18,017; 37.01%	Hannah Wolker; 3,752; 7.71%	Frédéric Olivier; 801; 1.65%	Jeff Benoit; 1,821; 3.74%	André Lafrance; 448; 0.92%	Marc Gagnon (PIQ); 277; 0.57%	Brenda Shanahan
La Prairie	Caroline Desrochers; 20,470; 34.61%	Lise des Greniers; 5,878; 9.94%	Alain Therrien; 25,862; 43.73%	Victoria Hernandez; 4,317; 7.30%	Barbara Joannette; 983; 1.66%	Ruth Fontaine; 1,532; 2.59%		Normand Chouinard (M-L); 98; 0.17%	Alain Therrien
Longueuil—Charles-LeMoyne	Sherry Romanado; 19,400; 40.44%	Isabelle Lalonde; 3,986; 8.31%	Nathalie Boisclair; 16,926; 35.28%	Kalden Dhatsenpa; 4,957; 10.33%	Nancy Cardin; 1,170; 2.44%	Tiny Olinga; 1,409; 2.94%		Pierre Chénier (M-L); 122; 0.25%	Sherry Romanado
Longueuil—Saint-Hubert	Florence Gagnon; 21,930; 38.32%	Boukare Tall; 3,964; 6.93%	Denis Trudel; 23,579; 41.20%	Mildred Murray; 4,553; 7.95%	Simon King; 1,599; 2.79%	Manon Girard; 1,358; 2.37%		Jacinthe Lafrenaye (PIQ); 252; 0.44%	Denis Trudel
Montarville	Marie-Ève Pelchat; 19,974; 34.75%	Julie Sauvageau; 5,460; 9.50%	Stéphane Bergeron; 26,011; 45.26%	Djaouida Sellah; 4,809; 8.37%		Natasha Hynes; 1,218; 2.12%			Stéphane Bergeron
Pierre-Boucher—Les Patriotes—Verchères	Louis-Gabriel Girard; 14,282; 25.85%	Jérôme Painchaud; 4,870; 8.82%	Xavier Barsalou-Duval; 29,978; 54.26%	Martin Leprohon; 4,261; 7.71%		Alexandre Blais; 1,078; 1.95%	Carole Boisvert; 777; 1.41%		Xavier Barsalou-Duval
Saint-Jean	Jean Rioux; 16,650; 28.12%	Serge Benoit; 7,544; 12.74%	Christine Normandin; 27,243; 46.01%	Jeremy Fournier; 4,308; 7.28%	Leigh V. Ryan; 1,262; 2.13%		Jean-Charles Cléroux; 1,790; 3.02%	Pierre Duteau (PIQ); 413; 0.70%	Christine Normandin
Salaberry—Suroît	Linda Gallant; 16,550; 27.19%	Jean Collette; 7,476; 12.28%	Claude Debellefeuille; 29,093; 47.80%	Joan Gottman; 4,529; 7.44%		Nicolas Thivierge; 2,207; 3.63%	Marcel Goyette; 561; 0.92%	Luc Bertrand (PIQ); 449; 0.74%	Claude DeBellefeuille
Vaudreuil—Soulanges	Peter Schiefke; 30,001; 46.47%	Karen Cox; 10,556; 16.35%	Thierry Vadnais-Lapierre; 14,308; 22.16%	Niklas Brake; 6,780; 10.50%	Cameron Stiff; 1,631; 2.53%		Ginette Destrempes; 1,288; 1.99%		Peter Schiefke

==== Northern Montreal and Laval ====
Electoral district	Candidates							Incumbent
Electoral district	Liberal	Conservative	BQ	NDP	Green	PPC	Other	Incumbent
Ahuntsic-Cartierville	Mélanie Joly; 26,402; 52.38%	Steven Duarte; 4,247; 8.43%	Anna Simonyan; 11,112; 22.04%	Ghada Chaabi; 5,844; 11.59%	Luc Joli-Coeur; 1,491; 2.96%	Manon Chevalier; 1,313; 2.60%		Mélanie Joly
Alfred-Pellan	Angelo Iacono; 24,516; 47.83%	Angiolino D'Anello; 6,988; 13.63%	Isabel Dion; 13,399; 26.14%	Cindy Mercer; 3,946; 7.70%	Pierre-Alexandre Corneillet; 940; 1.83%		Dwayne Cappelletti (FPC); 1,467; 2.86%	Angelo Iacono
Bourassa	Emmanuel Dubourg; 22,303; 60.39%	Ilyasa Sykes; 2,587; 7.00%	Ardo Dia; 6,907; 18.70%	Nicholas Ponari; 2,956; 8.00%	Nathe Perrone; 679; 1.84%	Michel Lavoie; 1,349; 3.65%	Michel Prairie (Ind.); 151; 0.41%	Emmanuel Dubourg
Laval—Les Îles	Fayçal El-Khoury; 24,758; 48.93%	Spyridonas Pettas; 8,963; 17.71%	Guillaume Jolivet; 9,656; 19.08%	Rowan Woodmass; 3,889; 7.69%	Ahmed Taleb; 760; 1.50%	Matthieu Couture; 2,571; 5.08%		Fayçal El-Khoury
Marc-Aurèle-Fortin	Yves Robillard; 22,992; 44.11%	Sarah Petrari; 6,120; 11.74%	Manon D. Lacharité; 16,055; 30.80%	Ali Faour; 4,461; 8.56%		Louis Léger; 1,509; 2.89%	Micheline Flibotte (FPC); 990; 1.90%	Yves Robillard
Papineau	**Justin Trudeau**; 22,848; 50.30%	Julio Rivera; 2,198; 4.84%	Nabila Ben Youssef; 6,830; 15.04%	Christine Paré; 10,303; 22.68%	Alain Lepine; 1,448; 3.19%	Christian Boutin; 1,064; 2.34%	Garnet Colly (M-L); 115 0.25%	**Justin Trudeau**
Papineau	**Justin Trudeau**; 22,848; 50.30%	Julio Rivera; 2,198; 4.84%	Nabila Ben Youssef; 6,830; 15.04%	Christine Paré; 10,303; 22.68%	Alain Lepine; 1,448; 3.19%	Christian Boutin; 1,064; 2.34%	Raymond Martin (Ind.); 102 0.22%	**Justin Trudeau**
Papineau	**Justin Trudeau**; 22,848; 50.30%	Julio Rivera; 2,198; 4.84%	Nabila Ben Youssef; 6,830; 15.04%	Christine Paré; 10,303; 22.68%	Alain Lepine; 1,448; 3.19%	Christian Boutin; 1,064; 2.34%	Béatrice Zako (Ind.); 97 0.21%	**Justin Trudeau**
Papineau	**Justin Trudeau**; 22,848; 50.30%	Julio Rivera; 2,198; 4.84%	Nabila Ben Youssef; 6,830; 15.04%	Christine Paré; 10,303; 22.68%	Alain Lepine; 1,448; 3.19%	Christian Boutin; 1,064; 2.34%	Above Znoneofthe (Rhino.); 418 0.92%	**Justin Trudeau**
Saint-Léonard—Saint-Michel	Patricia Lattanzio; 29,010; 69.38%	Louis Ialenti; 4,381; 10.48%	Laurence Massey; 3,395; 8.12%	Alicia Di Tullio; 3,460; 8.27%		Daniele Ritacca; 1,568; 3.75%		Patricia Lattanzio
Vimy	Annie Koutrakis; 25,316; 49.77%	Rima El-Helou; 6,829; 13.43%	Rachid Bandou; 11,811; 23.22%	Vassif Aliev; 4,731; 9.30%		Alejandro Morales-Loaiza; 2,175; 4.28%		Annie Koutrakis

==== Eastern Montreal ====
Electoral district	Candidates								Incumbent
Electoral district	Liberal	Conservative	BQ	NDP	Green	PPC	Marxist-Leninist	Other	Incumbent
Hochelaga	Soraya Martinez Ferrada; 18,197; 38.14%	Aime Calle Cabrera; 2,221; 4.66%	Simon Marchand; 15,089; 31.63%	Catheryn Roy-Goyette; 9,723; 20.38%	Zachary Lavarenne; 965; 2.02%	Marc-André Doucet-Beauchamp; 1,081; 2.27%	Christine Dandenault; 84; 0.18%	Michelle Paquette (Comm.); 108 0.23%	Soraya Martinez Ferrada
Hochelaga	Soraya Martinez Ferrada; 18,197; 38.14%	Aime Calle Cabrera; 2,221; 4.66%	Simon Marchand; 15,089; 31.63%	Catheryn Roy-Goyette; 9,723; 20.38%	Zachary Lavarenne; 965; 2.02%	Marc-André Doucet-Beauchamp; 1,081; 2.27%	Christine Dandenault; 84; 0.18%	Alan Smithee (Rhino.); 238 0.50%	Soraya Martinez Ferrada
Honoré-Mercier	Pablo Rodriguez; 29,033; 59.97%	Guy Croteau; 5,086; 10.51%	Charlotte Lévesque-Marin; 7,908; 16.34%	Paulina Ayala; 3,537; 7.31%	Bianca Deltorto-Russell; 734; 1.52%	Lucilia Miranda; 2,023; 4.18%	Yves Le Seigle; 88; 0.18%		Pablo Rodríguez
La Pointe-de-l'Île	Jonas Fadeu; 16,508; 32.32%	Massimo Anania; 3,427; 6.71%	Mario Beaulieu; 23,835; 46.66%	Alexandre Vallerand; 4,954; 9.70%		Jonathan Desclin; 1,399; 2.74%	Genevieve Royer; 159; 0.31%	Agnès Falquet (FPC); 577 1.13%	Mario Beaulieu
La Pointe-de-l'Île	Jonas Fadeu; 16,508; 32.32%	Massimo Anania; 3,427; 6.71%	Mario Beaulieu; 23,835; 46.66%	Alexandre Vallerand; 4,954; 9.70%		Jonathan Desclin; 1,399; 2.74%	Genevieve Royer; 159; 0.31%	Charles Phillippe Gervais (PIQ); 221 0.43%	Mario Beaulieu
Laurier—Sainte-Marie	Steven Guilbeault; 16,961; 37.96%	Ronan Reich; 1,500; 3.36%	Marie-Eve-Lyne Michel; 9,114; 20.40%	Nimâ Machouf; 14,680; 32.86%	Jean-Michel Lavarenne; 992; 2.22%	Daniel Tanguay; 758; 1.70%	Serge Lachapelle; 70; 0.16%	Cyril Julien (Ind.); 74 0.17%	Steven Guilbeault
Laurier—Sainte-Marie	Steven Guilbeault; 16,961; 37.96%	Ronan Reich; 1,500; 3.36%	Marie-Eve-Lyne Michel; 9,114; 20.40%	Nimâ Machouf; 14,680; 32.86%	Jean-Michel Lavarenne; 992; 2.22%	Daniel Tanguay; 758; 1.70%	Serge Lachapelle; 70; 0.16%	Kimberly Lamontagne (Animal); 199 0.45%	Steven Guilbeault
Laurier—Sainte-Marie	Steven Guilbeault; 16,961; 37.96%	Ronan Reich; 1,500; 3.36%	Marie-Eve-Lyne Michel; 9,114; 20.40%	Nimâ Machouf; 14,680; 32.86%	Jean-Michel Lavarenne; 992; 2.22%	Daniel Tanguay; 758; 1.70%	Serge Lachapelle; 70; 0.16%	Julie Morin (FPC); 233 0.52%	Steven Guilbeault
Laurier—Sainte-Marie	Steven Guilbeault; 16,961; 37.96%	Ronan Reich; 1,500; 3.36%	Marie-Eve-Lyne Michel; 9,114; 20.40%	Nimâ Machouf; 14,680; 32.86%	Jean-Michel Lavarenne; 992; 2.22%	Daniel Tanguay; 758; 1.70%	Serge Lachapelle; 70; 0.16%	Adrien Welsh (Comm.); 95 0.21%	Steven Guilbeault
Rosemont—La Petite-Patrie	Nancy Drolet; 12,738; 23.17%	Surelys Perez Hernandez; 2,199; 4.00%	Shophika Vaithyanathasarma; 11,751; 21.37%	Alexandre Boulerice; 26,708; 48.57%	Franco Fiori; 1,308; 2.38%		Gisèle Desrochers; 284; 0.52%		Alexandre Boulerice

==== Western Montreal ====
Electoral district	Candidates							Incumbent
Electoral district	Liberal	Conservative	BQ	NDP	Green	PPC	Other	Incumbent
Dorval—Lachine—LaSalle	Anju Dhillon; 25,233; 52.41%	Jude Bazelais; 5,754; 11.95%	Cloé Rose Jenneau; 7,542; 15.67%	Fabiola Ngamaleu Teumeni; 6,241; 12.96%	Laura Mariani; 1,351; 2.81%	Michael Patterson; 2,020; 4.20%		Anju Dhillon
Lac-Saint-Louis	Francis Scarpaleggia; 32,477; 56.26%	Ann Francis; 10,911; 18.90%	Rémi Lebeuf; 3,078; 5.33%	Jonathan Gray; 7,679; 13.30%	Milan Kona-Mancini; 1,868; 3.24%	Afia Lassy; 1,712; 2.97%		Francis Scarpaleggia
LaSalle—Émard—Verdun	David Lametti; 20,330; 42.93%	Janina Moran; 3,530; 7.45%	Raphaël Guérard; 10,461; 22.09%	Jason De Lierre; 9,168; 19.36%	Sarah Carter; 1,439; 3.04%	Michel Walsh; 1,600; 3.38%	Pascal Antonin (FPC); 636 1.34%	David Lametti
LaSalle—Émard—Verdun	David Lametti; 20,330; 42.93%	Janina Moran; 3,530; 7.45%	Raphaël Guérard; 10,461; 22.09%	Jason De Lierre; 9,168; 19.36%	Sarah Carter; 1,439; 3.04%	Michel Walsh; 1,600; 3.38%	JP Fortin (Comm.); 196 0.41%	David Lametti
Mount Royal	Anthony Housefather; 23,284; 57.69%	Frank Cavallaro; 9,889; 24.50%	Yegor Komarov; 1,585; 3.93%	Ibrahim Bruno El-Khoury; 3,381; 8.38%	Clement Badra; 1,083; 2.68%	Zachary Lozoff; 1,051; 2.60%	Diane Johnston (M-L); 89; 0.22%	Anthony Housefather
Notre-Dame-de-Grâce—Westmount	Marc Garneau; 24,510; 53.76%	Mathew Kaminski; 6,412; 14.06%	Jordan Craig Larouche; 2,407; 5.28%	Emma Elbourne-Weinstock; 8,753; 19.20%	Sam Fairbrother; 1,835; 4.02%	David Freiheit; 1,498; 3.29%	Rachel Hoffman (M-L); 117 0.26%	Marc Garneau
Notre-Dame-de-Grâce—Westmount	Marc Garneau; 24,510; 53.76%	Mathew Kaminski; 6,412; 14.06%	Jordan Craig Larouche; 2,407; 5.28%	Emma Elbourne-Weinstock; 8,753; 19.20%	Sam Fairbrother; 1,835; 4.02%	David Freiheit; 1,498; 3.29%	Geofryde Wandji (CHP); 59 0.13%	Marc Garneau
Outremont	Rachel Bendayan; 16,714; 45.39%	Jasmine Louras; 2,882; 7.83%	Célia Grimard; 5,535; 15.03%	Ève Péclet; 9,579; 26.02%	Grace Tarabey; 1,198; 3.25%	Yehuda Pinto; 819; 2.22%	Angela-Angie Joshi (Ind.); 93; 0.25%	Rachel Bendayan
Pierrefonds—Dollard	Sameer Zuberi; 29,296; 56.01%	Terry Roberts; 10,893; 20.83%	Nadia Bourque; 4,141; 7.92%	Maninderjit Kaur Tumbar; 6,034; 11.54%		Mark Sibthorpe; 1,942; 3.71%		Sameer Zuberi
Saint-Laurent	Emmanuella Lambropoulos; 22,056; 59.10%	Richard Serour; 6,902; 18.50%	Florence Racicot; 2,972; 7.96%	Nathan Devereaux; 4,059; 10.88%		Gregory Yablunovsky; 1,182; 3.17%	Ginette Boutet (M-L); 146; 0.39%	Emmanuella Lambropoulos
Ville-Marie—Le Sud-Ouest—Île-des-Sœurs	Marc Miller; 24,978; 50.54%	Steve Shanahan; 6,138; 12.42%	Soledad Orihuela-Bouchard; 6,176; 12.50%	Sophie Thiébaut; 9,241; 18.70%	Cynthia Charbonneau-Lavictoire; 1,343; 2.72%	Denise Dubé; 1,291; 2.61%	Linda Sullivan (M-L); 122 0.25%	
Ville-Marie—Le Sud-Ouest—Île-des-Sœurs	Marc Miller; 24,978; 50.54%	Steve Shanahan; 6,138; 12.42%	Soledad Orihuela-Bouchard; 6,176; 12.50%	Sophie Thiébaut; 9,241; 18.70%	Cynthia Charbonneau-Lavictoire; 1,343; 2.72%	Denise Dubé; 1,291; 2.61%	Hans Armando Vargas (Mar.); 134 0.27%	Marc Miller

==== Laurentides, Outaouais and Northern Quebec ====
Electoral district	Candidates								Incumbent
Electoral district	Liberal	Conservative	BQ	NDP	Green	PPC	FPC	Other	Incumbent
Abitibi—Baie-James—Nunavik—Eeyou	Lise Kistabish; 7,384; 25.97%	Steve Corriveau; 4,508; 15.85%	Sylvie Bérubé; 10,784; 37.92%	Pauline Lameboy; 3,323; 11.69%	Didier Pilon; 442; 1.55%	Michaël Cloutier; 1,072; 3.77%	Cédric Brazeau; 594; 2.09%	Jimmy Levesque (Mar.); 329; 1.16%	Sylvie Bérubé
Abitibi—Témiscamingue	William Legault-Lacasse; 11,013; 24.11%	Luis Henry Gonzalez Venegas; 5,339; 11.69%	Sébastien Lemire; 23,120; 50.61%	Bethany Stewart; 2,794; 6.12%	Martin Chartrand; 748; 1.64%	Eric Lacroix; 1,538; 3.37%	Dany Goulet; 858; 1.88%	Joël Lirette (Rhino.); 275; 0.60%	Sébastien Lemire
Argenteuil—La Petite-Nation	Stéphane Lauzon; 19,371; 38.27%	Marie Louis-Seize; 6,547; 12.94%	Yves Destroismaisons; 17,842; 35.25%	Michel Welt; 3,390; 6.70%		Marc Vachon; 2,777; 5.49%	Paul Lynes; 686; 1.36%		Stéphane Lauzon
Gatineau	Steven MacKinnon; 26,267; 50.04%	Joel E. Bernard; 5,752; 10.96%	Geneviève Nadeau; 12,278; 23.39%	Fernanda Rengel; 4,508; 8.59%	Rachid Jemmah; 783; 1.49%	Mathieu Saint-Jean; 2,264; 4.31%	Luc Lavoie; 411; 0.78%	Sébastien Grenier (Rhino.); 178 0.34%	Steven MacKinnon
Gatineau	Steven MacKinnon; 26,267; 50.04%	Joel E. Bernard; 5,752; 10.96%	Geneviève Nadeau; 12,278; 23.39%	Fernanda Rengel; 4,508; 8.59%	Rachid Jemmah; 783; 1.49%	Mathieu Saint-Jean; 2,264; 4.31%	Luc Lavoie; 411; 0.78%	Pierre Soublière (M-L); 56 0.11%	Steven MacKinnon
Hull—Aylmer	Greg Fergus; 26,892; 52.47%	Sandrine Perion; 5,507; 10.75%	Simon Provost; 8,323; 16.24%	Samuel Gendron; 6,483; 12.65%	Simon Gnocchini-Messier; 1,459; 2.85%	Eric Fleury; 1,864; 3.64%	Josée Lafleur; 375; 0.73%	Catherine Dickins (Ind.); 143 0.28%	Greg Fergus
Hull—Aylmer	Greg Fergus; 26,892; 52.47%	Sandrine Perion; 5,507; 10.75%	Simon Provost; 8,323; 16.24%	Samuel Gendron; 6,483; 12.65%	Simon Gnocchini-Messier; 1,459; 2.85%	Eric Fleury; 1,864; 3.64%	Josée Lafleur; 375; 0.73%	Mike LeBlanc (Rhino.); 203 0.40%	Greg Fergus
Laurentides—Labelle	Antoine Menassa; 15,966; 24.90%	Kathy Laframboise; 6,770; 10.56%	Marie-Hélène Gaudreau; 32,133; 50.11%	Eric-Abel Baland; 3,907; 6.09%	Michel Le Comte; 1,570; 2.45%	Richard Evanko; 2,432; 3.79%	**Michel Leclerc**; 1,165; 1.82%	Jean-Noël Sorel (Ind.); 180; 0.28%	Marie-Hélène Gaudreau
Mirabel	François Loza; 14,842; 23.52%	Catherine Lefebvre; 8,510; 13.48%	Jean-Denis Garon; 29,376; 46.55%	Benoit Bourassa; 5,221; 8.27%	Mario Guay; 1,412; 2.24%	Christian Montpetit; 2,569; 4.07%	Ariane Croteau; 1,182; 1.87%		Simon Marcil†
Pontiac	Sophie Chatel; 26,899; 43.38%	Michel Gauthier; 12,804; 20.65%	Gabrielle Desjardins; 10,424; 16.81%	Denise Giroux; 6,824; 11.01%	Shaughn McArthur; 1,711; 2.76%	David Bruce Gottfred; 2,813; 4.54%	Geneviève Labonté-Chartrand; 480; 0.77%	James McNair (CFF); 52; 0.08%	Will Amos†
Rivière-des-Mille-Îles	Linda Lapointe; 18,835; 35.29%	Marc Duffy-Vincelette; 5,479; 10.27%	Luc Desilets; 21,645; 40.56%	Joseph Hakizimana; 3,852; 7.22%	Alec Ware; 972; 1.82%	Hans Roker Jr; 1,468; 2.75%	Valérie Beauséjour; 847; 1.59%	Julius Bute (PIQ); 119 0.22%	Luc Desilets
Rivière-des-Mille-Îles	Linda Lapointe; 18,835; 35.29%	Marc Duffy-Vincelette; 5,479; 10.27%	Luc Desilets; 21,645; 40.56%	Joseph Hakizimana; 3,852; 7.22%	Alec Ware; 972; 1.82%	Hans Roker Jr; 1,468; 2.75%	Valérie Beauséjour; 847; 1.59%	Michael Dionne (Pat.); 149 0.28%	Luc Desilets
Rivière-du-Nord	Theodora Bajkin; 12,767; 22.27%	Patricia Morrissette; 6,803; 11.87%	Rhéal Fortin; 29,943; 52.23%	Mary-Helen Paspaliaris; 3,958; 6.90%		Keeyan Ravanshid; 2,164; 3.77%	Marie-Eve Damour; 1,036; 1.81%	Jean-François René (Rhino.); 373 0.65%	Rhéal Fortin
Rivière-du-Nord	Theodora Bajkin; 12,767; 22.27%	Patricia Morrissette; 6,803; 11.87%	Rhéal Fortin; 29,943; 52.23%	Mary-Helen Paspaliaris; 3,958; 6.90%		Keeyan Ravanshid; 2,164; 3.77%	Marie-Eve Damour; 1,036; 1.81%	Nicolas Riqueur-Lainé (PIQ); 285 0.50%	Rhéal Fortin
Terrebonne	Eric Forget; 17,475; 29.64%	Frédérick Desjardins; 6,183; 10.49%	Nathalie Sinclair-Desgagné; 24,270; 41.17%	Luke Mayba; 3,913; 6.64%	David Hamelin- Schuilenburg; 847; 1.44%	Louis Stinziani; 1,594; 2.70%	Nathan Fortin-Dubé; 803; 1.36%	Michel Boudrias (NA); 3,864; 6.55%	Michel Boudrias§
Thérèse-De Blainville	Ramez Ayoub; 18,396; 35.18%	Marc Bissonnette; 5,773; 11.04%	Louise Chabot; 21,526; 41.17%	Julienne Soumaoro; 3,827; 7.32%	Simon Paré-Poupart; 1,018; 1.95%	Vincent Aubé; 1,386; 2.65%	Peggy Tassignon; 362; 0.69%		Louise Chabot

=== Ontario ===
==== Ottawa ====
Electoral district	Candidates						Incumbent
Electoral district	Liberal	Conservative	NDP	Green	PPC	Other	Incumbent
Carleton	Gustave Roy; 24,298; 34.28%	Pierre Poilievre; 35,356; 49.89%	Kevin Hua; 8,164; 11.52%	Nira Dookeran; 1,327; 1.87%	Peter Crawley; 1,728; 2.44%		Pierre Poilievre
Kanata—Carleton	Jenna Sudds; 26,394; 41.79%	Jennifer McAndrew; 24,373; 38.59%	Melissa Coenraad; 8,822; 13.97%	Jennifer Purdy; 1,709; 2.71%	Scott Miller; 1,858; 2.94%		Karen McCrimmon$
Nepean	Chandra Arya; 29,620; 45.05%	Matt Triemstra; 22,184; 33.74%	Sean Devine; 10,786; 16.41%	Gordon Kubanek; 1,318; 2.00%	Jay Nera; 1,840; 2.80%		Chandra Arya
Orléans	Marie-France Lalonde; 39,101; 51.94%	Mary-Elsie Wolfe; 21,700; 28.82%	Jessica Joanis; 10,983; 14.59%	Michael Hartnett; 1,233; 1.64%	Spencer Oklobdzija; 2,046; 2.72%	André Junior Cléroux (FPC); 220; 0.29%	Marie-France Lalonde
Ottawa Centre	Yasir Naqvi; 33,825; 45.50%	Carol Clemenhagen; 11,650; 15.67%	Angella MacEwen; 24,552; 33.03%	Angela Keller-Herzog; 2,115; 2.84%	Regina Watteel; 1,605; 2.16%	Shelby Bertrand (Animal); 261 0.35%	Catherine McKenna$
Ottawa Centre	Yasir Naqvi; 33,825; 45.50%	Carol Clemenhagen; 11,650; 15.67%	Angella MacEwen; 24,552; 33.03%	Angela Keller-Herzog; 2,115; 2.84%	Regina Watteel; 1,605; 2.16%	Richard "Rich" Joyal (Ind.); 132 0.18%	Catherine McKenna$
Ottawa Centre	Yasir Naqvi; 33,825; 45.50%	Carol Clemenhagen; 11,650; 15.67%	Angella MacEwen; 24,552; 33.03%	Angela Keller-Herzog; 2,115; 2.84%	Regina Watteel; 1,605; 2.16%	Alex McDonald (Comm.); 201 0.27%	Catherine McKenna$
Ottawa South	David McGuinty; 29,038; 48.81%	Eli Tannis; 15,497; 26.05%	Huda Mukbil; 11,514; 19.35%	Les Schram; 1,401; 2.35%	Chylow Hall; 1,898; 3.19%	Larry Wasslen (Comm.); 144; 0.24%	David McGuinty
Ottawa—Vanier	Mona Fortier; 28,462; 49.05%	Heidi Jensen; 11,611; 20.01%	Lyse-Pascale Inamuco; 13,703; 23.61%	Christian Proulx; 1,816; 3.13%	Jean-Jacques Desgranges; 1,855; 3.20%	Crystelle Bourguignon (FPC); 179 0.31%	Mona Fortier
Ottawa—Vanier	Mona Fortier; 28,462; 49.05%	Heidi Jensen; 11,611; 20.01%	Lyse-Pascale Inamuco; 13,703; 23.61%	Christian Proulx; 1,816; 3.13%	Jean-Jacques Desgranges; 1,855; 3.20%	Daniel Elford (Libert.); 248 0.43%	Mona Fortier
Ottawa—Vanier	Mona Fortier; 28,462; 49.05%	Heidi Jensen; 11,611; 20.01%	Lyse-Pascale Inamuco; 13,703; 23.61%	Christian Proulx; 1,816; 3.13%	Jean-Jacques Desgranges; 1,855; 3.20%	Marie-Chantal TaiEl Leriche (Ind.); 157 0.27%	Mona Fortier
Ottawa West—Nepean	Anita Vandenbeld; 25,889; 45.10%	Jennifer Jennekens; 16,473; 28.70%	Yavar Hameed; 11,163; 19.45%	David Stibbe; 1,642; 2.86%	David Yeo; 1,908; 3.32%	Sean Mulligan (CHP); 327; 0.57%	Anita Vandenbeld

==== Eastern Ontario ====
Electoral district	Candidates						Incumbent
Electoral district	Liberal	Conservative	NDP	Green	PPC	Other	Incumbent
Bay of Quinte	Neil Ellis; 22,542; 36.53%	Ryan Williams; 25,479; 41.29%	Stephanie Bell; 9,284; 15.05%	Erica Charlton; 1,350; 2.19%	Janine LeClerc; 3,045; 4.94%		Neil Ellis
Glengarry—Prescott—Russell	Francis Drouin; 30,362; 46.07%	Susan McArthur; 21,979; 33.35%	Konstantine Malakos; 7,022; 10.65%	Daniel Lapierre; 1,350; 2.05%	Brennan Austring; 4,458; 6.76%	Marc Bisaillon (FPC); 422 0.64%	Francis Drouin
Glengarry—Prescott—Russell	Francis Drouin; 30,362; 46.07%	Susan McArthur; 21,979; 33.35%	Konstantine Malakos; 7,022; 10.65%	Daniel Lapierre; 1,350; 2.05%	Brennan Austring; 4,458; 6.76%	The Joker (Ind.); 314 0.48%	Francis Drouin
Hastings—Lennox and Addington	Mike Bossio; 19,056; 34.86%	Shelby Kramp-Neuman; 24,651; 45.09%	Matilda DeBues; 6,020; 11.01%	Reg Wilson; 971; 1.78%	James Babcock; 3,131; 5.73%	Jennifer Sloan (Ind.); 838; 1.53%	Derek Sloan#‡ (running in Banff—Airdrie)
Kingston and the Islands	Mark Gerretsen; 27,724; 41.07%	Gary Oosterhof; 16,019; 23.73%	Vic Sahai; 19,775; 29.29%	Waji Khan; 1,673; 2.48%	Shelley Sayle-Udall; 2,314; 3.43%		Mark Gerretsen
Lanark—Frontenac—Kingston	Michelle Foxton; 16,617; 26.41%	Scott Reid; 30,761; 48.90%	Steve Garrison; 9,828; 15.62%	Calvin Neufeld; 1,664; 2.65%	Florian Bors; 3,830; 6.09%	Blake Hamilton (Rhino.); 211; 0.34%	Scott Reid
Leeds—Grenville—Thousand Islands and Rideau Lakes	Roberta L Abbott; 14,935; 25.20%	Michael Barrett; 29,950; 50.53%	Michelle Taylor; 8,863; 14.95%	Lorraine Rekmans; 2,134; 3.60%	Alex Cassell; 3,394; 5.73%		Michael Barrett
Renfrew—Nipissing—Pembroke	Cyndi Mills; 11,335; 19.37%	Cheryl Gallant; 28,967; 49.50%	Jodie Primeau; 12,263; 20.96%	Michael Lariviere; 1,111; 1.90%	David Ainsworth; 4,469; 7.64%	Stefan Klietsch (Ind.); 373; 0.64%	Cheryl Gallant
Stormont—Dundas—South Glengarry	Denis Moquin; 12,443; 23.63%	Eric Duncan; 29,255; 55.56%	Trevor Kennedy; 5,804; 11.02%	Jeanie Warnock; 1,230; 2.34%	David Anber; 3,921; 7.45%		Eric Duncan

==== Central Ontario ====
Electoral district	Candidates						Incumbent
Electoral district	Liberal	Conservative	NDP	Green	PPC	Other	Incumbent
Barrie—Innisfil	Lisa-Marie Wilson; 15,292; 28.89%	John Brassard; 25,234; 47.67%	Aleesha Gostkowski; 8,349; 15.77%		Corrado Brancato; 4,060; 7.67%		John Brassard
Barrie—Springwater—Oro-Medonte	Tanya Saari; 16,145; 30.91%	Doug Shipley; 23,555; 45.09%	Sarah Lochhead; 8,910; 17.06%		Chris Webb; 3,629; 6.95%		Doug Shipley
Bruce—Grey—Owen Sound	Anne Marie Watson; 14,738; 25.23%	Alex Ruff; 28,727; 49.18%	Christopher Neudorf; 7,939; 13.59%	Ashley Michelle Lawrence; 1,789; 3.06%	Anna-Marie Fosbrooke; 4,697; 8.04%	Reima Kaikkonen (Ind.); 524; 0.90%	Alex Ruff
Dufferin—Caledon	Lisa Post; 19,867; 30.30%	Kyle Seeback; 31,490; 48.02%	Samantha Sanchez; 6,866; 10.47%	Jenni Michelle Le Forestier; 2,754; 4.20%	Anthony Zambito; 4,389; 6.69%	Stephen McKendrick (Ind.); 207; 0.32%	Kyle Seeback
Haliburton—Kawartha Lakes—Brock	Judi Forbes; 15,645; 23.10%	Jamie Schmale; 35,418; 52.30%	Zac Miller; 9,730; 14.37%	Angel Godsoe; 1,696; 2.50%	Alison Davidson; 4,769; 7.04%	Gene Balfour (Libert.); 463; 0.68%	Jamie Schmale
Northumberland—Peterborough South	Alison Lester; 23,336; 33.46%	Philip Lawrence; 31,015; 44.47%	Kim McArthur-Jackson; 9,809; 14.07%	Christina Wilson; 1,764; 2.53%	Nathan Lang; 3,813; 5.47%		Philip Lawrence
Peterborough—Kawartha	Maryam Monsef; 24,664; 35.13%	Michelle Ferreri; 27,402; 39.03%	Joy Lachica; 13,302; 18.95%	Chanté White; 1,553; 2.21%	Paul Lawton; 3,073; 4.38%	Robert M. Bowers (Ind.); 218; 0.31%	Maryam Monsef
Simcoe—Grey	Bren Munro; 21,320; 27.83%	Terry Dowdall; 36,249; 47.32%	Lucas Gillies; 10,140; 13.24%	Nicholas Clayton; 2,969; 3.88%	Adam Minatel; 5,550; 7.24%	Ken Stouffer (CHP); 382; 0.50%	Terry Dowdall
Simcoe North	Cynthia Wesley-Esquimaux; 19,332; 30.39%	Adam Chambers; 27,383; 43.05%	Janet-Lynne Durnford; 9,958; 15.66%	Krystal Brooks; 1,903; 2.99%	Stephen Makk; 4,822; 7.58%	Russ Emo (CHP); 210; 0.33%	Bruce Stanton†
York—Simcoe	Daniella Johnson; 14,469; 29.04%	Scot Davidson; 24,900; 49.97%	Benjamin Jenkins; 6,800; 13.65%		Michael Lotter; 3,662; 7.35%		Scot Davidson

==== Durham and York ====
Electoral district	Candidates						Incumbent
Electoral district	Liberal	Conservative	NDP	Green	PPC	Other	Incumbent
Ajax	Mark Holland; 28,279; 56.83%	Arshad Awan; 13,237; 26.60%	Monique Hughes; 6,988; 14.04%	Leigh Paulseth; 1,254; 2.52%			Mark Holland
Aurora—Oak Ridges—Richmond Hill	Leah Taylor Roy; 20,764; 45.24%	Leona Alleslev; 19,304; 42.06%	Janice Hagan; 3,594; 7.83%		Anthony Siskos; 1,734; 3.78%	Serge Korovitsyn (Libert.); 500; 1.09%	Leona Alleslev
Durham	Jonathan Giancroce; 20,267; 29.92%	**Erin O'Toole**; 31,423; 46.39%	Chris Cameron; 11,865; 17.52%		Patricia Conlin; 3,725; 5.50%	Sarah Gabrielle Baron (Ind.); 251 0.37%	**Erin O'Toole**
Durham	Jonathan Giancroce; 20,267; 29.92%	**Erin O'Toole**; 31,423; 46.39%	Chris Cameron; 11,865; 17.52%		Patricia Conlin; 3,725; 5.50%	Kurdil-Telt Patch (Ind.); 49 0.07%	**Erin O'Toole**
Durham	Jonathan Giancroce; 20,267; 29.92%	**Erin O'Toole**; 31,423; 46.39%	Chris Cameron; 11,865; 17.52%		Patricia Conlin; 3,725; 5.50%	Adam Smith (Rhino.); 150 0.22%	**Erin O'Toole**
King—Vaughan	Deb Schulte; 21,458; 42.92%	Anna Roberts; 22,534; 45.07%	Sandra Lozano; 3,234; 6.47%	Roberta Herod; 620; 1.24%	Gilmar Oprisan; 2,149; 4.30%		Deb Schulte
Markham—Stouffville	Helena Jaczek; 29,773; 50.99%	Ben Smith; 20,740; 35.52%	Muhammad Ahsin Sahi; 4,961; 8.50%	Uzair Baig; 1,049; 1.80%	René De Vries; 1,869; 3.20%		Helena Jaczek
Markham—Thornhill	Mary Ng; 23,709; 61.54%	Melissa Felian; 10,136; 26.31%	Paul Sahbaz; 3,222; 8.36%	Mimi Lee; 813; 2.11%	Ilia Pashaev; 648; 1.68%		Mary Ng
Markham—Unionville	Paul Chiang; 21,958; 48.55%	Bob Saroya; 18,959; 41.92%	Aftab Qureshi; 3,001; 6.64%	Elvin Kao; 1,306; 2.89%			Bob Saroya
Newmarket—Aurora	Tony Van Bynen; 24,208; 43.78%	Harold Kim; 21,173; 38.29%	Yvonne Kelly; 6,338; 11.46%	Tim Flemming; 1,015; 1.84%	Andre Gagnon; 2,296; 4.15%	Dorian Baxter (Ind.); 260; 0.47%	Tony Van Bynen
Oshawa	Afroza Hossain; 13,044; 23.12%	Colin Carrie; 22,409; 39.71%	Shailene Panylo; 16,079; 28.50%	Sonny Mir; 864; 1.53%	Darryl Mackie; 4,029; 7.14%		Colin Carrie
Pickering—Uxbridge	Jennifer O'Connell; 27,271; 46.88%	Jacob Mantle; 20,976; 36.06%	Eileen Higdon; 7,592; 13.05%		Corneliu Chisu; 2,328; 4.00%		Jennifer O'Connell
Richmond Hill	Majid Jowhari; 21,784; 47.71%	Costas Menegakis; 17,715; 38.80%	Adam DeVita; 3,995; 8.75%		Igor Tvorogov; 1,363; 2.98%	Charity DiPaola (Ind.); 619 1.36%	Majid Jowhari
Richmond Hill	Majid Jowhari; 21,784; 47.71%	Costas Menegakis; 17,715; 38.80%	Adam DeVita; 3,995; 8.75%		Igor Tvorogov; 1,363; 2.98%	Angelika Keller (Ind.); 186 0.41%	Majid Jowhari
Thornhill	Gary Gladstone; 18,168; 36.29%	Melissa Lantsman; 25,687; 51.31%	Raz Razvi; 3,041; 6.07%	Daniella Mikanovsky; 844; 1.69%	Samuel Greenfield; 2,322; 4.64%		Peter Kent†
Vaughan—Woodbridge	Francesco Sorbara; 21,699; 46.01%	Angela Panacci; 19,019; 40.33%	Peter Michael DeVita; 3,265; 6.92%	Muhammad Hassan Khan; 453; 0.96%	Mario Greco; 2,567; 5.44%	Luca Mele (Ind.); 159; 0.34%	Francesco Sorbara
Whitby	Ryan Turnbull; 27,375; 44.11%	Maleeha Shahid; 22,271; 35.88%	Brian Dias; 8,766; 14.12%	Johannes Kotilainen; 972; 1.57%	Thomas Androvic; 2,682; 4.32%		Ryan Turnbull

==== Suburban Toronto ====
Electoral district	Candidates					Incumbent
Electoral district	Liberal	Conservative	NDP	PPC	Other	Incumbent
Don Valley East	Michael Coteau; 22,356; 59.90%	Penelope Williams; 8,766; 23.49%	Simon Topp; 4,618; 12.37%	Peter De Marco; 1,585; 4.25%		Yasmin Ratansi†
Don Valley North	Han Dong; 22,067; 54.44%	Sabrina Zuniga; 12,098; 29.85%	Bruce Griffin; 4,304; 10.62%	Jay Sobel; 1,301; 3.21%	Natalie Telfer (Green); 765; 1.89%	Han Dong
Etobicoke Centre	Yvan Baker; 27,635; 48.02%	Geoffrey Turner; 20,108; 34.94%	Ashley Da silva 5,804; 10.09%	Maurice Cormier; 4,003; 6.96%		Yvan Baker
Etobicoke—Lakeshore	James Maloney; 30,355; 47.38%	Indira Bains; 20,457; 31.93%	Sasha Kane; 8,775; 13.70%	Bill McLachlan; 2,857; 4.46%	Sean Carson (Rhino.); 119 0.19%	James Maloney
Etobicoke—Lakeshore	James Maloney; 30,355; 47.38%	Indira Bains; 20,457; 31.93%	Sasha Kane; 8,775; 13.70%	Bill McLachlan; 2,857; 4.46%	**Anna Di Carlo** (M-L); 139 0.22%	James Maloney
Etobicoke—Lakeshore	James Maloney; 30,355; 47.38%	Indira Bains; 20,457; 31.93%	Sasha Kane; 8,775; 13.70%	Bill McLachlan; 2,857; 4.46%	Afam Elue (Green); 1,363 2.13%	James Maloney
Etobicoke North	Kirsty Duncan; 21,201; 59.61%	Priti Lamba; 8,866; 24.93%	Cecil Peter; 3,708; 10.43%	Jim Boutsikakis; 1,473; 4.14%	Carol Royer (Ind.); 316; 0.89%	Kirsty Duncan
Humber River—Black Creek	Judy Sgro; 19,533; 60.69%	Rinku Shah; 5,599; 17.40%	Matias de Dovitiis; 5,279; 16.40%	Raatib Anderson; 1,258; 3.91%	Christine Nugent (M-L); 130 0.40%	Judy Sgro
Humber River—Black Creek	Judy Sgro; 19,533; 60.69%	Rinku Shah; 5,599; 17.40%	Matias de Dovitiis; 5,279; 16.40%	Raatib Anderson; 1,258; 3.91%	Unblind Tibbin (Green); 388 1.21%	Judy Sgro
Scarborough—Agincourt	Jean Yip; 20,712; 56.54%	Mark Johnson; 10,630; 29.02%	Larisa Julius; 3,679; 10.04%	Eric Muraven; 978; 2.67%	Arjun Balasingham (Green); 631; 1.72%	Jean Yip
Scarborough Centre	Salma Zahid; 23,128; 57.59%	Malcolm Ponnayan; 9,819; 24.45%	Faiz Kamal; 5,479; 13.64%	Petru Rozoveanu; 1,472; 3.67%	Aylwin T Mathew (NCA); 263; 0.65%	Salma Zahid
Scarborough-Guildwood	John McKay; 22,944; 61.10%	Carmen Wilson; 7,998; 21.30%	Michelle Spencer; 5,091; 13.56%	James Bountrogiannis; 1,096; 2.92%	Kevin Clarke (Ind.); 155 0.41%	John McKay
Scarborough-Guildwood	John McKay; 22,944; 61.10%	Carmen Wilson; 7,998; 21.30%	Michelle Spencer; 5,091; 13.56%	James Bountrogiannis; 1,096; 2.92%	Opa Day (Ind.); 85 0.23%	John McKay
Scarborough-Guildwood	John McKay; 22,944; 61.10%	Carmen Wilson; 7,998; 21.30%	Michelle Spencer; 5,091; 13.56%	James Bountrogiannis; 1,096; 2.92%	Aslam Khan (Cent.); 129 0.34%	John McKay
Scarborough-Guildwood	John McKay; 22,944; 61.10%	Carmen Wilson; 7,998; 21.30%	Michelle Spencer; 5,091; 13.56%	James Bountrogiannis; 1,096; 2.92%	**Gus Stefanis** (CNP); 52 0.14%	John McKay
Scarborough North	Shaun Chen; 21,178; 66.57%	Fazal Shah; 5,999; 18.86%	Christina Love; 3,514; 11.05%	David Moore; 763; 2.40%	Sheraz Khan (Cent.); 361; 1.13%	Shaun Chen
Scarborough—Rouge Park	Gary Anandasangaree; 28,702; 62.78%	Zia Choudhary; 9,628; 21.06%	Kingsley Kwok; 6,068; 13.27%	Asad Rehman; 1,322; 2.89%		Gary Anandasangaree
Scarborough Southwest	Bill Blair; 24,823; 57.50%	Mohsin Bhuiyan; 8,981; 20.80%	Guled Arale; 6,924; 16.04%	Ramona Pache; 1,259; 2.92%	Amanda Cain (Green); 1,068 2.47%	Bill Blair
Scarborough Southwest	Bill Blair; 24,823; 57.50%	Mohsin Bhuiyan; 8,981; 20.80%	Guled Arale; 6,924; 16.04%	Ramona Pache; 1,259; 2.92%	David Edward-Ooi Poon (Ind.); 117 0.27%	Bill Blair
Willowdale	Ali Ehsassi; 21,043; 51.19%	Daniel Lee; 13,916; 33.86%	Hal Berman; 4,231; 10.29%	Al Wahab; 1,102; 2.68%	Anna Gorka (Green); 812; 1.98%	Ali Ehsassi
York Centre	Ya'ara Saks; 17,430; 47.29%	Joel Yakov Etienne; 13,949; 37.85%	Kemal Ahmed; 3,753; 10.18%	Nixon Nguyen; 1,726; 4.68%		Ya'ara Saks

==== Central Toronto ====
Electoral district	Candidates						Incumbent
Electoral district	Liberal	Conservative	NDP	Green	PPC	Other	Incumbent
Beaches—East York	Nathaniel Erskine-Smith; 28,919; 56.58%	Lisa Robinson; 7,336; 14.35%	Alejandra Ruiz Vargas; 11,513; 22.52%	Reuben Anthony DeBoer; 1,388; 2.72%	Radu Rautescu; 1,613; 3.16%	Philip Fernandez (M-L); 50 0.10%	Nathaniel Erskine-Smith
Beaches—East York	Nathaniel Erskine-Smith; 28,919; 56.58%	Lisa Robinson; 7,336; 14.35%	Alejandra Ruiz Vargas; 11,513; 22.52%	Reuben Anthony DeBoer; 1,388; 2.72%	Radu Rautescu; 1,613; 3.16%	Jennifer Moxon (Comm.); 131 0.26%	Nathaniel Erskine-Smith
Beaches—East York	Nathaniel Erskine-Smith; 28,919; 56.58%	Lisa Robinson; 7,336; 14.35%	Alejandra Ruiz Vargas; 11,513; 22.52%	Reuben Anthony DeBoer; 1,388; 2.72%	Radu Rautescu; 1,613; 3.16%	Karen Lee Wilde (Ind.); 166 0.32%	Nathaniel Erskine-Smith
Davenport (judicial recount terminated)	Julie Dzerowicz; 19,930; 42.13%	Jenny Kalimbet; 4,774; 10.09%	Alejandra Bravo; 19,854; 41.97%	Adrian Currie; 1,087; 2.30%	Tara Dos Remedios; 1,499; 3.17%	Chai Kalevar (Ind.); 77 0.16%	Julie Dzerowicz
Davenport (judicial recount terminated)	Julie Dzerowicz; 19,930; 42.13%	Jenny Kalimbet; 4,774; 10.09%	Alejandra Bravo; 19,854; 41.97%	Adrian Currie; 1,087; 2.30%	Tara Dos Remedios; 1,499; 3.17%	Troy Young (Ind.); 86 0.18%	Julie Dzerowicz
Don Valley West	Rob Oliphant; 24,798; 52.75%	Yvonne Robertson; 16,695; 35.51%	Syeda Riaz; 3,814; 8.11%	Elvira Caputolan; 761; 1.62%	Michael Minas; 881; 1.87%	Adil Khan (Cent.); 65; 0.14%	Rob Oliphant
Eglinton—Lawrence	Marco Mendicino; 24,051; 48.48%	Geoff Pollock; 18,082; 36.45%	Caleb Senneker; 4,543; 9.16%	Eric Frydman; 1,490; 3.00%	Timothy Gleeson; 1,445; 2.91%		Marco Mendicino
Parkdale—High Park	Arif Virani; 22,307; 42.45%	Nestor Sanajko; 6,815; 12.97%	Paul Taylor; 20,602; 39.21%	Diem Marchand-Lafortune; 957; 1.82%	Wilfried Richard Alexander Danzinger; 1,642; 3.13%	Lorne Gershuny (M-L); 90 0.17%	Arif Virani
Parkdale—High Park	Arif Virani; 22,307; 42.45%	Nestor Sanajko; 6,815; 12.97%	Paul Taylor; 20,602; 39.21%	Diem Marchand-Lafortune; 957; 1.82%	Wilfried Richard Alexander Danzinger; 1,642; 3.13%	Terry Parker (Mar.); 130 0.25%	Arif Virani
Spadina—Fort York	Kevin Vuong (Note: Vuong has announced he will sit as an independent when parliament convenes. Because he was on the ballot as a Liberal, he's still treated as a Liberal here.); 18,991; 38.90%	Sukhi Jandu; 9,875; 20.23%	Norm Di Pasquale; 16,834; 34.48%	Amanda Rosenstock; 1,645; 3.37%	Ian Roden; 1,476; 3.02%		Adam Vaughan$
Toronto Centre	Marci Ien; 23,071; 50.35%	Ryan Lester; 5,571; 12.16%	Brian Chang; 11,909; 25.99%	**Annamie Paul**; 3,921; 8.56%	Syed Jaffery; 1,047; 2.29%	Ivan Byard (Comm.); 181 0.40%	Marci Ien
Toronto Centre	Marci Ien; 23,071; 50.35%	Ryan Lester; 5,571; 12.16%	Brian Chang; 11,909; 25.99%	**Annamie Paul**; 3,921; 8.56%	Syed Jaffery; 1,047; 2.29%	Peter Stubbins (Animal); 117 0.26%	Marci Ien
Toronto—Danforth	Julie Dabrusin; 25,214; 48.36%	Michael Carey; 6,547; 12.56%	Clare Hacksel; 17,555; 33.67%	Maryem Tollar; 1,023; 1.96%	Wayne Simmons; 1,282; 2.46%	Habiba Desai (Ind.); 123 0.24%	Julie Dabrusin
Toronto—Danforth	Julie Dabrusin; 25,214; 48.36%	Michael Carey; 6,547; 12.56%	Clare Hacksel; 17,555; 33.67%	Maryem Tollar; 1,023; 1.96%	Wayne Simmons; 1,282; 2.46%	**Elizabeth Rowley** (Comm.); 215 0.41%	Julie Dabrusin
Toronto—Danforth	Julie Dabrusin; 25,214; 48.36%	Michael Carey; 6,547; 12.56%	Clare Hacksel; 17,555; 33.67%	Maryem Tollar; 1,023; 1.96%	Wayne Simmons; 1,282; 2.46%	**Liz White** (Animal); 183 0.35%	Julie Dabrusin
Toronto—St. Paul's	Carolyn Bennett; 26,429; 49.22%	Stephanie Osadchuk; 13,587; 25.30%	Sidney Coles; 9,036; 16.83%	Phil De Luna; 3,214; 5.99%	Peter Remedios; 1,432; 2.67%		Carolyn Bennett
University—Rosedale	Chrystia Freeland; 22,451; 47.53%	Steven Taylor; 9,473; 20.06%	Nicole Robicheau; 11,921; 25.24%	Tim Grant; 1,974; 4.18%	David Kent; 1,172; 2.48%	Drew Garvie (Comm.); 244; 0.52%	Chrystia Freeland
York South—Weston	Ahmed Hussen; 21,644; 56.12%	Sajanth Mohan; 7,783; 20.18%	Hawa Mire; 6,517; 16.90%	Nicki Ward; 872; 2.26%	Sitara Chiu; 1,754; 4.55%		Ahmed Hussen

==== Brampton, Mississauga and Oakville ====
Electoral district	Candidates						Incumbent
Electoral district	Liberal	Conservative	NDP	Green	PPC	Other	Incumbent
Brampton Centre	Shafqat Ali; 16,189; 47.66%	Jagdeep Singh; 11,026; 32.46%	Jim McDowell; 5,932; 17.46%			Ronni Shino (Ind.); 824; 2.43%	Ramesh Sangha†
Brampton East	Maninder Sidhu; 22,120; 53.49%	Naval Bajaj; 11,647; 28.17%	Gail Bannister-Clarke; 6,511; 15.75%		Manjeet Singh; 1,073; 2.59%		Maninder Sidhu
Brampton North	Ruby Sahota; 23,412; 54.26%	Medha Joshi; 13,289; 30.80%	Teresa Yeh; 6,448; 14.94%				Ruby Sahota
Brampton South	Sonia Sidhu; 21,120; 50.98%	Ramandeep Brar; 12,596; 30.40%	Tejinder Singh; 5,894; 14.23%		Nicholas Craniotis; 1,820; 4.39%		Sonia Sidhu
Brampton West	Kamal Khera; 25,780; 55.31%	Jermaine Chambers; 13,186; 28.29%	Gurprit Gill; 6,097; 13.08%		Rahul Samuel Zia; 1,218; 2.61%	Sivakumar Ramasamy (Ind.); 328; 0.70%	Kamal Khera
Mississauga Centre	Omar Alghabra; 25,719; 54.22%	Kathy-Ying Zhao; 13,390; 28.23%	Teneshia Samuel; 5,331; 11.24%	Craig Laferriere; 863; 1.82%	Elie Diab; 2,128; 4.49%		Omar Alghabra
Mississauga East—Cooksville	Peter Fonseca; 22,806; 50.04%	Grace Adamu; 14,722; 32.30%	Tom Takacs; 4,678; 10.26%		Joseph Westover; 2,933; 6.44%	Gord Elliott (Ind.); 329 0.72%	Peter Fonseca
Mississauga East—Cooksville	Peter Fonseca; 22,806; 50.04%	Grace Adamu; 14,722; 32.30%	Tom Takacs; 4,678; 10.26%		Joseph Westover; 2,933; 6.44%	Dagmar Sullivan (M-L); 107 0.23%	Peter Fonseca
Mississauga—Erin Mills	Iqra Khalid; 25,866; 51.05%	James Nguyen; 17,088; 33.72%	Kaukab Usman; 5,178; 10.22%	Ewan DeSilva; 829; 1.64%	Michael Bayer; 1,711; 3.38%		Iqra Khalid
Mississauga—Lakeshore	Sven Spengemann; 25,284; 44.94%	Michael Ras; 21,761; 38.68%	Sarah Walji; 5,488; 9.75%	Elizabeth Robertson; 1,265; 2.25%	Vahid Seyfaie; 2,367; 4.21%	Kayleigh Tahk (Rhino.); 94; 0.17%	Sven Spengemann
Mississauga—Malton	Iqwinder Gaheer; 21,766; 52.77%	Clyde Roach; 12,625; 30.61%	Waseem Ahmed; 5,771; 13.99%	Mark Davidson; 811; 1.97%		Frank Chilelli (M-L); 275; 0.67%	Navdeep Bains†
Mississauga—Streetsville	Rechie Valdez; 23,698; 47.28%	Jasveen Rattan; 17,131; 34.18%	Farina Hassan; 6,186; 12.34%	Chris Hill; 1,048; 2.09%	Gurdeep Wolosz; 1,851; 3.69%	Natalie Spizzirri (Animal); 210; 0.42%	Gagan Sikand†
Oakville	Anita Anand; 28,137; 46.13%	Kerry Colborne; 24,430; 40.05%	Jerome Adamo; 5,373; 8.81%	Oriana Knox; 1,090; 1.79%	JD Meaney; 1,970; 3.23%		Anita Anand
Oakville North—Burlington	Pam Damoff; 30,910; 46.82%	Hanan Rizkalla; 25,091; 38.00%	Lenaee Dupuis; 6,574; 9.96%	Bruno Sousa; 1,019; 1.54%	Gilbert Jubinville; 2,429; 3.68%		Pam Damoff

==== Hamilton, Burlington and Niagara ====
Electoral district	Candidates						Incumbent
Electoral district	Liberal	Conservative	NDP	Green	PPC	Other	Incumbent
Burlington	Karina Gould; 31,602; 45.73%	Emily Brown; 25,742; 37.25%	Nick Page; 7,507; 10.86%	Christian Cullis; 1,368; 1.98%	Michael Bator; 2,764; 4.00%	Jevin David Carroll (Rhino.); 122; 0.18%	Karina Gould
Flamborough—Glanbrook	Vito Sgro; 21,350; 35.54%	Dan Muys; 24,370; 40.57%	Lorne Newick; 9,409; 15.66%	Thomas Hatch; 1,254; 2.09%	Bill Panchyshyn; 3,686; 6.14%		David Sweet†
Hamilton Centre	Margaret Bennett; 10,941; 26.50%	Fabian Grenning; 6,209; 15.04%	Matthew Green; 20,105; 48.70%	Avra Caroline Weinstein; 1,105; 2.68%	Kevin Barber; 2,637; 6.39%	Nigel Cheriyan (Comm.); 184 0.45%	Matthew Green
Hamilton Centre	Margaret Bennett; 10,941; 26.50%	Fabian Grenning; 6,209; 15.04%	Matthew Green; 20,105; 48.70%	Avra Caroline Weinstein; 1,105; 2.68%	Kevin Barber; 2,637; 6.39%	Nathalie Xian Yi Yan (Ind.); 99 0.24%	Matthew Green
Hamilton East—Stoney Creek	Chad Collins; 18,358; 36.87%	Ned Kuruc; 13,934; 27.98%	Nick Milanovic; 12,748; 25.60%	Larry Pattison; 1,020; 2.05%	Mario Ricci; 3,733; 7.50%		Bob Bratina$
Hamilton Mountain	Lisa Hepfner; 16,548; 34.15%	Al Miles; 11,828; 24.41%	Malcolm Allen; 15,706; 32.41%	Dave Urquhart; 974; 2.01%	Chelsey Taylor; 3,098; 6.39%	Jim Enos (CHP); 306; 0.63%	Scott Duvall†
Hamilton West—Ancaster—Dundas	Filomena Tassi; 27,845; 44.32%	Bert Laranjo; 18,162; 28.91%	Roberto Henriquez; 12,432; 19.79%	Victoria Galea; 1,661; 2.64%	Dean Woods; 2,584; 4.11%	Spencer Rocchi (Rhino.); 137; 0.22%	Filomena Tassi
Milton	Adam van Koeverden; 28,503; 51.46%	Nadeem Akbar; 18,313; 33.06%	Muhammad Riaz Sahi; 4,925; 8.89%	Chris Kowalchuk; 1,280; 2.31%	Shibli Haddad; 2,365; 4.27%		Adam van Koeverden
Niagara Centre	Vance Badawey; 20,576; 35.01%	Graham Speck; 18,324; 31.17%	Melissa McGlashan; 14,086; 23.96%	Kurtis McCartney; 1,123; 1.91%	Michael Kimmons; 4,670; 7.95%		Vance Badawey
Niagara Falls	Andrea Kaiser; 23,650; 33.48%	Tony Baldinelli; 26,810; 37.95%	Brian Barker; 12,871; 18.22%	Melanie Holm; 1,370; 1.94%	Peter Taras; 5,948; 8.42%		Tony Baldinelli
Niagara West	Ian Bingham; 16,815; 30.42%	Dean Allison; 25,206; 45.60%	Nameer Rahman; 7,064; 12.78%	Joanna Kocsis; 1,602; 2.90%	Shaunalee Derkson; 3,933; 7.12%	Harold Jonker (CHP); 657; 1.19%	Dean Allison
St. Catharines	Chris Bittle; 22,069; 37.83%	Krystina Waler; 19,018; 32.60%	Trecia McLennon; 12,294; 21.08%	Catharine Rhodes; 1,091; 1.87%	Rebecca Hahn; 3,860; 6.62%		Chris Bittle

==== Midwestern Ontario ====
Electoral district	Candidates						Incumbent
Electoral district	Liberal	Conservative	NDP	Green	PPC	Other	Incumbent
Brantford—Brant	Alison Macdonald; 18,795; 28.42%	Larry Brock; 26,675; 40.34%	Adrienne Roberts; 12,964; 19.61%	Karleigh Csordas; 1,759; 2.66%	Cole Squire; 5,633; 8.52%	Leslie Bory (Ind.); 160 0.24%	Phil McColeman†
Brantford—Brant	Alison Macdonald; 18,795; 28.42%	Larry Brock; 26,675; 40.34%	Adrienne Roberts; 12,964; 19.61%	Karleigh Csordas; 1,759; 2.66%	Cole Squire; 5,633; 8.52%	John The Engineer Turmel (Ind.); 136 0.21%	Phil McColeman†
Cambridge	Bryan May; 20,866; 38.04%	Connie Cody; 18,876; 34.41%	Lorne Bruce; 9,319; 16.99%	Michele Braniff; 1,860; 3.39%	Maggie Segounis; 3,931; 7.17%		Bryan May
Guelph	Lloyd Longfield; 29,382; 42.11%	Ashish Sachan; 16,795; 24.07%	Aisha Jahangir; 14,713; 21.09%	Michelle Bowman; 5,250; 7.52%	Joshua Leier; 3,182; 4.56%	Tristan Dineen (Comm.); 187 0.27%	Lloyd Longfield
Guelph	Lloyd Longfield; 29,382; 42.11%	Ashish Sachan; 16,795; 24.07%	Aisha Jahangir; 14,713; 21.09%	Michelle Bowman; 5,250; 7.52%	Joshua Leier; 3,182; 4.56%	Karen Levenson (Animal); 262 0.38%	Lloyd Longfield
Haldimand—Norfolk	Karen Matthews; 17,224; 27.52%	Leslyn Lewis; 29,664; 47.39%	Meghan Piironen; 8,320; 13.29%		Ken Gilpin; 6,570; 10.50%	Charles Lugosi (CHP); 559 0.89%	Vacant
Haldimand—Norfolk	Karen Matthews; 17,224; 27.52%	Leslyn Lewis; 29,664; 47.39%	Meghan Piironen; 8,320; 13.29%		Ken Gilpin; 6,570; 10.50%	George McMorrow (VCP); 255 0.41%	Vacant
Huron—Bruce	James Rice; 16,015; 26.17%	Ben Lobb; 31,170; 50.93%	Jan Johnstone; 9,056; 14.80%		Jack Stecho; 4,437; 7.25%	Justin L Smith (Ind.); 519; 0.85%	Ben Lobb
Kitchener Centre	Raj Saini; 8,297; 16.21%	Mary Henein Thorn; 12,537; 24.50%	Beisan Zubi; 8,938; 17.46%	Mike Morrice; 17,872; 34.92%	Diane Boskovic; 3,381; 6.61%	Ellen Papenburg (Animal); 154; 0.30%	Raj Saini
Kitchener—Conestoga	Tim Louis; 20,025; 39.30%	Carlene Hawley; 19,448; 38.17%	Narine Dat Sookram; 5,948; 11.67%	Owen Bradley; 1,842; 3.62%	Kevin Dupuis; 3,690; 7.24%		Tim Louis
Kitchener South—Hespeler	Valerie Bradford; 18,596; 37.45%	Tyler Calver; 17,649; 35.54%	Suresh Arangath; 8,079; 16.27%	Gabe Rose; 1,710; 3.44%	Melissa Baumgaertner; 3,351; 6.75%	Elaine Baetz (M-L); 57 0.11%	Marwan Tabbara†
Kitchener South—Hespeler	Valerie Bradford; 18,596; 37.45%	Tyler Calver; 17,649; 35.54%	Suresh Arangath; 8,079; 16.27%	Gabe Rose; 1,710; 3.44%	Melissa Baumgaertner; 3,351; 6.75%	Stephen Davis (Rhino.); 93 0.19%	Marwan Tabbara†
Kitchener South—Hespeler	Valerie Bradford; 18,596; 37.45%	Tyler Calver; 17,649; 35.54%	Suresh Arangath; 8,079; 16.27%	Gabe Rose; 1,710; 3.44%	Melissa Baumgaertner; 3,351; 6.75%	C.A. Morrison (Ind.); 119 0.24%	Marwan Tabbara†
Oxford	Elizabeth Quinto; 12,720; 20.53%	Dave MacKenzie; 29,146; 47.05%	Matthew Chambers; 11,325; 18.28%	Bob Reid; 1,683; 2.72%	Wendy Martin; 6,595; 10.65%	Allen Scovil (CHP); 479; 0.77%	Dave MacKenzie
Perth Wellington	Brendan Knight; 13,684; 24.62%	John Nater; 26,984; 48.55%	Kevin Kruchkywich; 9,552; 17.19%		Wayne Baker; 5,357; 9.64%		John Nater
Waterloo	Bardish Chagger; 26,926; 45.14%	Meghan Shannon; 16,528; 27.71%	Jonathan Cassels; 11,360; 19.04%	Karla Villagomez Fajardo; 2,038; 3.42%	Patrick Doucette; 2,802; 4.70%		Bardish Chagger
Wellington—Halton Hills	Melanie Lang; 18,384; 27.17%	Michael Chong; 35,257; 52.11%	Noor Jahangir; 7,050; 10.42%	Ran Zhu; 2,606; 3.85%	Syl Carle; 4,359; 6.44%		Michael Chong

==== Southwestern Ontario ====
Electoral district	Candidates						Incumbent
Electoral district	Liberal	Conservative	NDP	Green	PPC	Other	Incumbent
Chatham-Kent—Leamington	Greg Hetherington; 15,683; 28.59%	Dave Epp; 22,435; 40.90%	Dan Gelinas; 8,007; 14.60%	Mark Vercouteren; 837; 1.53%	Liz Vallee; 7,892; 14.39%		Dave Epp
Elgin—Middlesex—London	Afeez Ajibowu; 12,326; 19.55%	Karen Vecchio; 31,472; 49.91%	Katelyn Cody; 10,086; 15.99%	Amanda Stark; 1,417; 2.25%	Chelsea Hillier; 7,429; 11.78%	Michael Hopkins (CHP); 328; 0.52%	Karen Vecchio
Essex	Audrey Festeryga; 10,813; 15.45%	Chris Lewis; 28,741; 41.07%	Tracey Ramsey; 22,278; 31.84%	Nancy Pancheshan; 865; 1.24%	Beth Charron-Rowberry; 6,925; 9.90%	Andrew George (Ind.); 172 0.25%	Chris Lewis
Essex	Audrey Festeryga; 10,813; 15.45%	Chris Lewis; 28,741; 41.07%	Tracey Ramsey; 22,278; 31.84%	Nancy Pancheshan; 865; 1.24%	Beth Charron-Rowberry; 6,925; 9.90%	Jeremy Palko (CHP); 182 0.26%	Chris Lewis
Lambton—Kent—Middlesex	Sudit Ranade; 12,552; 20.68%	Lianne Rood; 29,431; 48.49%	Jason Henry; 11,107; 18.30%	Jeremy Hull; 1,035; 1.71%	Kevin Mitchell; 6,567; 10.82%		Lianne Rood
London—Fanshawe	Mohamed Hammoud; 11,882; 23.11%	Mattias Vanderley; 12,486; 24.28%	Lindsay Mathyssen; 22,336; 43.44%		Kyle Free; 4,718; 9.18%		Lindsay Mathyssen
London North Centre	Peter Fragiskatos; 22,921; 39.10%	Stephen Gallant; 15,889; 27.11%	Dirka Prout; 15,611; 26.63%	Mary Ann Hodge; 1,297; 2.21%	Marc Emery; 2,902; 4.95%		Peter Fragiskatos
London West	Arielle Kayabaga; 25,308; 36.88%	Rob Flack; 22,273; 32.46%	Shawna Lewkowitz; 16,858; 24.57%		Mike McMullen; 3,409; 4.97%	**Jacques Y Boudreau** (Libert.); 773; 1.13%	Kate Young$
Sarnia—Lambton	Lois Nantais; 10,975; 19.29%	Marilyn Gladu; 26,292; 46.21%	Adam Kilner; 11,990; 21.07%	Stefanie Bunko; 848; 1.49%	Brian Everaert; 6,359; 11.18%	Tom Laird (CHP); 435; 0.76%	Marilyn Gladu
Windsor—Tecumseh	Irek Kusmierczyk; 18,134; 31.83%	Kathy Borrelli; 14,605; 25.63%	Cheryl Hardcastle; 17,465; 30.65%	Henry Oulevey; 682; 1.20%	Victor Green; 5,927; 10.40%	Laura Chesnik (M-L); 164; 0.29%	Irek Kusmierczyk
Windsor West	Sandra Pupatello; 13,524; 27.77%	Anthony Orlando; 9,415; 19.34%	Brian Masse; 21,541; 44.24%		Matthew Giancola; 4,060; 8.34%	Margaret Villamizar (M-L); 153; 0.31%	Brian Masse

==== Northern Ontario ====
Electoral district	Candidates						Incumbent
Electoral district	Liberal	Conservative	NDP	Green	PPC	Other	Incumbent
Algoma—Manitoulin—Kapuskasing	Duke Peltier; 8,888; 22.49%	John Sagman; 10,885; 27.54%	Carol Hughes; 15,895; 40.22%	Stephen Zimmermann; 726; 1.84%	Harry Jaaskelainen; 2,840; 7.19%	Clarence Baarda (CHP); 289; 0.73%	Carol Hughes
Kenora	David Bruno; 5,190; 19.90%	Eric Melillo; 11,103; 42.57%	Janine Seymour; 7,801; 29.91%	Remi Rheault; 364; 1.40%	Craig Martin; 1,625; 6.23%		Eric Melillo
Nickel Belt	Marc G Serré; 17,353; 35.18%	Charles Humphrey; 13,425; 27.22%	Andréane Simone Chénier; 13,137; 26.64%	Craig Gravelle; 848; 1.72%	David Hobbs; 4,558; 9.24%		Marc Serré
Nipissing—Timiskaming	Anthony Rota; 18,405; 38.75%	Steven Trahan; 15,104; 31.80%	Scott Robertson; 10,493; 22.09%		Gregory J Galante; 3,494; 7.36%		Anthony Rota
Parry Sound-Muskoka	Jovanie Nicoyishakiye; 12,014; 21.65%	Scott Aitchison; 26,600; 47.93%	Heather Hay; 9,339; 16.83%	Marc Mantha; 3,099; 5.58%	James Tole; 4,184; 7.54%	James Fawcett (NCA); 95 0.17%	Scott Aitchison
Parry Sound-Muskoka	Jovanie Nicoyishakiye; 12,014; 21.65%	Scott Aitchison; 26,600; 47.93%	Heather Hay; 9,339; 16.83%	Marc Mantha; 3,099; 5.58%	James Tole; 4,184; 7.54%	Daniel Predie Jr (Ind.); 169 0.30%	Scott Aitchison
Sault Ste. Marie	Terry Sheehan; 15,231; 37.91%	Sonny Spina; 14,984; 37.29%	Marie Morin-Strom; 8,041; 20.01%		Kasper Makowski; 1,923; 4.79%		Terry Sheehan
Sudbury	Viviane LaPointe; 15,871; 34.52%	Ian Symington; 12,747; 27.73%	Nadia Verrelli; 13,569; 29.52%	David Robert Robinson; 940; 2.04%	Colette Andréa Methé; 2,735; 5.95%	J. David Popescu (Ind.); 111; 0.24%	Paul Lefebvre†
Thunder Bay—Rainy River	Marcus Powlowski; 13,655; 34.26%	Adelina Pecchia; 11,671; 29.28%	Yuk-Sem Won; 11,342; 28.45%	Tracey MacKinnon; 571; 1.43%	Alan Aubut; 2,621; 6.58%		Marcus Powlowski
Thunder Bay—Superior North	Patty Hajdu; 16,893; 40.72%	Joshua Taylor; 10,035; 24.19%	Chantelle Bryson; 11,244; 27.11%	Amanda Moddejonge; 735; 1.77%	Rick Daines; 2,465; 5.94%	Alexander Vodden (Libert.); 111; 0.27%	Patty Hajdu
Timmins-James Bay	Steve Black; 8,508; 24.61%	Morgan Ellerton; 9,393; 27.17%	Charlie Angus; 12,132; 35.09%		Stephen MacLeod; 4,537; 13.12%		Charlie Angus

=== Manitoba ===
==== Rural Manitoba ====
Electoral district	Candidates						Incumbent
Electoral district	Liberal	Conservative	NDP	Green	PPC	Other	Incumbent
Brandon—Souris	Linda Branconnier; 4,608; 12.08%	Larry Maguire; 22,733; 59.57%	Whitney Hodgins; 7,838; 20.54%		Tylor Baer; 2,981; 7.81%		Larry Maguire
Churchill—Keewatinook Aski	Shirley Robinson; 4,514; 25.18%	Charlotte Larocque; 4,330; 24.15%	Niki Ashton; 7,632; 42.57%	Ralph McLean; 552; 3.08%	Dylan Young; 899; 5.01%		Niki Ashton
Dauphin—Swan River—Neepawa	Kevin Carlson; 4,892; 12.70%	Dan Mazier; 22,718; 58.99%	Arthur Holroyd; 5,678; 14.74%	Shirley Lambrecht; 835; 2.17%	Donnan McKenna; 4,052; 10.52%	Lori Falloon-Austin (Mav.); 339; 0.88%	Dan Mazier
Portage—Lisgar	Andrew Carrier; 4,967; 10.95%	Candice Bergen; 23,819; 52.52%	Ken Friesen; 6,068; 13.38%		Solomon Wiebe; 9,790; 21.58%	Jerome Dondo (CHP); 712; 1.57%	Candice Bergen
Provencher	Trevor Kirczenow; 8,471; 16.98%	Ted Falk; 24,294; 48.68%	Serina Pottinger; 6,270; 12.56%	Janine G. Gibson; 1,273; 2.55%	Nöel Gautron; 8,227; 16.49%	Rick Loewen (Ind.); 1,366; 2.74%	Ted Falk
Selkirk—Interlake—Eastman	Detlev Regelsky; 6,567; 13.24%	James Bezan; 28,308; 57.06%	Margaret Smith; 9,604; 19.36%	Wayne James; 1,328; 2.68%	Ian Kathwaroon; 3,800; 7.66%		James Bezan

==== Winnipeg ====
Electoral district	Candidates						Incumbent
Electoral district	Liberal	Conservative	NDP	Green	PPC	Other	Incumbent
Charleswood—St. James—Assiniboia—Headingley	Doug Eyolfson; 17,651; 38.98%	Marty Morantz; 18,111; 40.00%	Madelaine Dwyer; 6,974; 15.40%	Vanessa Parks; 947; 2.09%	Angela Van Hussen; 1,594; 3.52%		Marty Morantz
Elmwood—Transcona	Sara Mirwaldt; 6,169; 14.74%	Rejeanne Caron; 11,768; 28.13%	Daniel Blaikie; 20,791; 49.69%	Devlin Hinchey; 676; 1.62%	Jamie Cumming; 2,435; 5.82%		Daniel Blaikie
Kildonan—St. Paul	Mary-Jane Bennett; 12,934; 29.43%	Raquel Dancho; 18,375; 41.81%	Emily Clark; 10,313; 23.47%		Sean Howe; 2,325; 5.29%		Raquel Dancho
Saint Boniface—Saint Vital	Dan Vandal; 19,908; 43.78%	Shola Agboola; 12,749; 28.04%	Meghan Waters; 9,767; 21.48%	Laurent Poliquin; 676; 1.49%	Jane MacDiarmid; 1,978; 4.35%	**Sébastien CoRhino** (Rhino.); 80 0.18%	Dan Vandal
Saint Boniface—Saint Vital	Dan Vandal; 19,908; 43.78%	Shola Agboola; 12,749; 28.04%	Meghan Waters; 9,767; 21.48%	Laurent Poliquin; 676; 1.49%	Jane MacDiarmid; 1,978; 4.35%	Matthew Correia (VCP); 17 0.04%	Dan Vandal
Saint Boniface—Saint Vital	Dan Vandal; 19,908; 43.78%	Shola Agboola; 12,749; 28.04%	Meghan Waters; 9,767; 21.48%	Laurent Poliquin; 676; 1.49%	Jane MacDiarmid; 1,978; 4.35%	14 independents below table	Dan Vandal
Winnipeg Centre	Paul Ong; 8,446; 28.39%	Sabrina Brenot; 3,818; 12.83%	Leah Gazan; 14,962; 50.29%	Andrew Brown; 708; 2.38%	Bhavni Bhakoo; 1,229; 4.13%	Jamie Buhler (Libert.); 373 1.25%	Leah Gazan
Winnipeg Centre	Paul Ong; 8,446; 28.39%	Sabrina Brenot; 3,818; 12.83%	Leah Gazan; 14,962; 50.29%	Andrew Brown; 708; 2.38%	Bhavni Bhakoo; 1,229; 4.13%	Debra Wall (Animal); 213 0.72%	Leah Gazan
Winnipeg North	Kevin Lamoureux; 16,442; 52.35%	Anas Kassem; 4,126; 13.14%	Melissa Chung-Mowat; 8,998; 28.65%	Angela Brydges; 418; 1.33%	Patrick Neilan; 1,315; 4.19%	Robert Crooks (Comm.); 109; 0.35%	Kevin Lamoureux
Winnipeg South	Terry Duguid; 22,423; 47.46%	Melanie Maher; 15,967; 33.80%	Aiden Kahanovitch; 6,632; 14.04%	Greg Boettcher; 681; 1.44%	Byron Curtis Gryba; 1,542; 3.26%		Terry Duguid
Winnipeg South Centre	Jim Carr; 22,214; 45.55%	Joyce Bateman; 13,566; 27.82%	Julia Riddell; 10,064; 20.64%	Douglas Hemmerling; 1,341; 2.75%	Chase Wells; 1,352; 2.77%	Cam Scott (Comm.); 234; 0.48%	Jim Carr

Independents of Saint Boniface—Saint Vital (number of votes, percentage)

- Scott A A Anderson (58, 0.13%)
- Denis Berthiaume (16, 0.04%)
- Jean-Denis Boudreault (24, 0.05%)
- Naomi Crisostomo (31, 0.07%)
- Charles Currie (25, 0.05%)
- Manon Lili Desbiens (11, 0.02%)
- Alexandra Engering (14, 0.03%)
- Scott Falkingham (14, 0.03%)
- Kerri Hildebrandt (31, 0.07%)
- Ryan Huard (14, 0.03%)
- Conrad Lukawski (7, 0.02%)
- Eliana Rosenblum (13, 0.03%)
- Patrick Strzalkowski (21, 0.05%)
- Tomas Szuchewycz (15, 0.03%)

=== Saskatchewan ===
==== Southern Saskatchewan ====
Electoral district	Candidates							Incumbent
Electoral district	Liberal	Conservative	NDP	Green	PPC	Maverick	Independent	Incumbent
Cypress Hills—Grasslands	Mackenzie Hird; 1,492; 4.35%	Jeremy Patzer; 24,518; 71.53%	Alex McPhee; 3,604; 10.51%	Carol Vandale; 284; 0.83%	Charles Reginald Hislop; 2,826; 8.24%	Mark Skagen; 1,360; 3.97%	Maria Rose Lewans; 193; 0.56%	Jeremy Patzer
Moose Jaw—Lake Centre—Lanigan	Katelyn Zimmer; 2,526; 6.13%	Fraser Tolmie; 24,869; 60.39%	Talon Regent; 7,975; 19.36%	Isaiah Hunter; 438; 1.06%	Chey Craik; 4,712; 11.44%	David Craig Townsend; 664; 1.61%		Tom Lukiwski†
Regina—Lewvan	Susan Cameron; 6,310; 13.82%	Warren Steinley; 21,375; 46.83%	Tria Donaldson; 15,763; 34.54%	Michael Wright; 560; 1.23%	Roderick Kletchko; 1,635; 3.58%			Warren Steinley
Regina—Qu'Appelle	Cecilia Melanson; 3,344; 10.15%	Andrew Scheer; 20,400; 61.90%	Annaliese Bos; 6,879; 20.87%	Naomi Hunter; 668; 2.03%	Andrew Yubeta; 1,668; 5.06%			Andrew Scheer
Regina—Wascana	Sean McEachern; 10,390; 26.92%	Michael Kram; 19,261; 49.90%	Erin Hidlebaugh; 6,975; 18.07%	Victor Lau; 622; 1.61%	Mario Milanovski; 1,352; 3.50%			Michael Kram
Souris—Moose Mountain	Javin Ames-Sinclair; 1,636; 4.16%	Robert Kitchen; 30,049; 76.38%	Hannah Ann Duerr; 3,107; 7.90%		Diane Neufeld; 3,571; 9.08%	Greg Douglas; 977; 2.48%		Robert Kitchen
Yorkton—Melville	Jordan Ames-Sinclair; 2,187; 6.31%	Cathay Wagantall; 23,794; 68.65%	Halsten David Rust; 4,239; 12.23%	Valerie Brooks; 614; 1.77%	Braden Robertson; 3,227; 9.31%	Denise Loucks; 597; 1.72%		Cathay Wagantall

==== Northern Saskatchewan ====
Electoral district	Candidates						Incumbent
Electoral district	Liberal	Conservative	NDP	Green	PPC	Other	Incumbent
Battlefords—Lloydminster	Larry Ingram; 1,748; 5.63%	Rosemarie Falk; 21,336; 68.72%	Erik Hansen; 3,718; 11.98%	Kerri Wall; 237; 0.76%	Terry Sieben; 1,847; 5.95%	Ken Rutherford (Mav.); 2,162; 6.96%	Rosemarie Falk
Carlton Trail—Eagle Creek	Harrison Andruschak; 2,066; 5.03%	Kelly Block; 28,192; 68.61%	Shannon O'Toole; 5,608; 13.65%	Cherese Reemaul; 379; 0.92%	Micheal Bohach; 3,791; 9.23%	Diane Pastoor (Mav.); 1,053; 2.56%	Kelly Block
Desnethé—Missinippi—Churchill River	Buckley Belanger; 5,533; 26.89%	Gary Vidal; 10,036; 48.78%	Harmonie King; 3,548; 17.25%	Nasser Dean Chalifoux; 215; 1.05%	Dezirae Reddekopp; 1,002; 4.87%	Stephen King (Ind.); 240; 1.17%	Gary Vidal
Prince Albert	Estelle Hjertaas; 3,653; 10.61%	Randy Hoback; 22,340; 64.89%	Ken MacDougall; 5,214; 15.15%	Hamish Graham; 364; 1.06%	Joseph McCrea; 2,388; 6.94%	Heather Schmitt (Mav.); 466; 1.35%	Randy Hoback
Saskatoon—Grasswood	Rokhan Sarwar; 6,460; 14.17%	Kevin Waugh; 22,760; 49.91%	Kyla Kitzul; 13,720; 30.09%	Gillian Walker; 556; 1.22%	Mark Friesen; 2,108; 4.62%		Kevin Waugh
Saskatoon—University	Dawn Dumont Walker; 4,608; 10.84%	Corey Tochor; 20,389; 47.95%	Claire Card; 15,042; 35.38%	North-Marie Hunter; 405; 0.95%	Guto Penteado; 1,778; 4.18%	Jeremy Fisher (Comm.); 100 0.24%	Corey Tochor
Saskatoon—University	Dawn Dumont Walker; 4,608; 10.84%	Corey Tochor; 20,389; 47.95%	Claire Card; 15,042; 35.38%	North-Marie Hunter; 405; 0.95%	Guto Penteado; 1,778; 4.18%	Carl A Wesolowski (CHP); 195 0.46%	Corey Tochor
Saskatoon West	Ruben Rajakumar; 2,778; 8.19%	Brad Redekopp; 15,379; 45.36%	Robert Doucette; 13,328; 39.31%	Dave Greenfield; 357; 1.05%	Kevin Boychuk; 2,064; 6.09%		Brad Redekopp

=== Alberta ===
==== Rural Alberta ====
Electoral district	Candidates							Incumbent
Electoral district	Liberal	Conservative	NDP	Green	PPC	Maverick	Other	Incumbent
Banff—Airdrie	David Gamble; 9,572; 12.43%	Blake Richards; 43,677; 56.73%	Sarah Zagoda; 12,482; 16.21%	Aidan Blum; 1,405; 1.82%	Nadine Wellwood; 5,808; 7.54%	Tariq Elnaga; 1,475; 1.92%	Caroline O'Driscoll (Ind.); 489 0.64%	Blake Richards
Banff—Airdrie	David Gamble; 9,572; 12.43%	Blake Richards; 43,677; 56.73%	Sarah Zagoda; 12,482; 16.21%	Aidan Blum; 1,405; 1.82%	Nadine Wellwood; 5,808; 7.54%	Tariq Elnaga; 1,475; 1.92%	Derek Sloan (NA); 2,020 2.62%	Blake Richards
Banff—Airdrie	David Gamble; 9,572; 12.43%	Blake Richards; 43,677; 56.73%	Sarah Zagoda; 12,482; 16.21%	Aidan Blum; 1,405; 1.82%	Nadine Wellwood; 5,808; 7.54%	Tariq Elnaga; 1,475; 1.92%	Ron Voss (Ind.); 60 0.08%	Blake Richards
Battle River—Crowfoot	Leah Diane McLeod; 2,515; 4.29%	Damien Kurek; 41,819; 71.29%	Tonya Ratushniak; 5,761; 9.82%	Daniel Brisbin; 554; 0.94%	Dennis Trepanier; 5,440; 9.27%	Jeff Golka; 2,393; 4.08%	John Irwin (VCP); 178; 0.30%	Damien Kurek
Bow River	Getu Shawile; 3,869; 7.57%	Martin Shields; 35,676; 69.76%	Michael MacLean; 4,726; 9.24%		Jonathan Bridges; 5,108; 9.99%	Orrin Bliss; 1,368; 2.68%	Tom Lipp (CHP); 391; 0.76%	Martin Shields
Foothills	Paula Shimp; 4,441; 6.92%	John Barlow; 44,456; 69.23%	Michelle Traxel; 7,117; 11.08%	Brett Rogers; 802; 1.25%	Daniel Hunter; 5,111; 7.96%	Josh Wylie; 2,289; 3.56%		John Barlow
Fort McMurray—Cold Lake	Abdifatah Abdi; 3,060; 7.09%	Laila Goodridge; 29,242; 67.77%	Garnett Robinson; 4,377; 10.14%	Brian Deheer; 423; 0.98%	Shawn McDonald; 5,481; 12.70%	Jonathan Meyers; 479; 1.11%	Hughie Shane Whitmore (VCP); 88; 0.20%	David Yurdiga$
Grande Prairie-Mackenzie	Dan Campbell; 2,397; 4.51%	Chris Warkentin; 36,361; 68.42%	Jennifer Villebrun; 6,462; 12.16%		Shawn McLean; 5,411; 10.18%	Ambrose Ralph; 2,195; 4.13%	Donovan Eckstrom (Rhino.); 314; 0.59%	Chris Warkentin
Lakeland	John Turvey; 2,610; 4.96%	Shannon Stubbs; 36,557; 69.43%	Des Bissonnette; 5,519; 10.48%	Kira Brunner; 464; 0.88%	Ann McCormack; 5,827; 11.07%	Fred Sirett; 1,674; 3.18%		Shannon Stubbs
Lethbridge	Devon Hargreaves; 8,928; 15.14%	Rachael Harder; 32,817; 55.65%	Elaine Perez; 11,386; 19.31%		Kimmie Hovan; 4,097; 6.95%		Geoffrey Capp (CHP); 566 0.96%	Rachael Harder
Lethbridge	Devon Hargreaves; 8,928; 15.14%	Rachael Harder; 32,817; 55.65%	Elaine Perez; 11,386; 19.31%		Kimmie Hovan; 4,097; 6.95%		Kim Siever (Ind.); 1,179 2.00%	Rachael Harder
Medicine Hat—Cardston—Warner	Hannah Wilson; 3,515; 7.26%	Glen Motz; 31,648; 65.37%	Jocelyn Stenger; 6,816; 14.08%	Diandra Bruised Head; 725; 1.50%	Brodie Heidinger; 4,484; 9.26%	Geoff Shoesmith; 1,226; 2.53%		Glen Motz
Peace River—Westlock	Leslie Penny; 2,431; 5.20%	Arnold Viersen; 29,486; 63.02%	Gail Ungstad; 6,019; 12.86%	Jordan Francis MacDougall; 364; 0.78%	Darryl Boisson; 5,916; 12.64%	Colin Krieger; 2,573; 5.50%		Arnold Viersen
Red Deer—Lacombe	David Ondieki; 3,704; 5.98%	Blaine Calkins; 39,805; 64.22%	Tanya Heyden-Kaye; 8,806; 14.21%		Megan Lim; 7,893; 12.73%	Harry Joujan; 986; 1.59%	Joan Barnes (NA); 573 0.92%	Blaine Calkins
Red Deer—Lacombe	David Ondieki; 3,704; 5.98%	Blaine Calkins; 39,805; 64.22%	Tanya Heyden-Kaye; 8,806; 14.21%		Megan Lim; 7,893; 12.73%	Harry Joujan; 986; 1.59%	Matthew Watson (Libert.); 212 0.34%	Blaine Calkins
Red Deer—Mountain View	Olumide Adewumi; 4,084; 6.45%	Earl Dreeshen; 40,680; 64.25%	Marie Grabowski; 8,826; 13.94%		Kelly Lorencz; 7,581; 11.97%	Mark Wilcox; 1,640; 2.59%	Jared Pilon (Libert.); 211 0.33%	Earl Dreeshen
Red Deer—Mountain View	Olumide Adewumi; 4,084; 6.45%	Earl Dreeshen; 40,680; 64.25%	Marie Grabowski; 8,826; 13.94%		Kelly Lorencz; 7,581; 11.97%	Mark Wilcox; 1,640; 2.59%	Clayten Willington (Ind.); 298 0.47%	Earl Dreeshen
Yellowhead	Sheila Schumacher; 2,829; 5.57%	Gerald Soroka; 33,603; 66.16%	Guillaume Roy; 5,977; 11.77%		Michael Manchen; 6,475; 12.75%	Todd Muir; 1,761; 3.47%	Gordon Francey (VCP); 147; 0.29%	Gerald Soroka

==== Greater Edmonton ====
Electoral district	Candidates					Incumbent
Electoral district	Liberal	Conservative	NDP	PPC	Other	Incumbent
Edmonton Centre	Randy Boissonnault; 16,560; 33.69%	James Cumming; 15,945; 32.44%	Heather MacKenzie; 14,171; 28.83%	Brock Crocker; 2,094; 4.26%	Merryn Edwards (M-L); 112 0.23%	James Cumming
Edmonton Centre	Randy Boissonnault; 16,560; 33.69%	James Cumming; 15,945; 32.44%	Heather MacKenzie; 14,171; 28.83%	Brock Crocker; 2,094; 4.26%	Valerie Keefe (Libert.); 266 0.54%	James Cumming
Edmonton Griesbach	Habiba Mohamud; 5,979; 13.89%	Kerry Diotte; 15,957; 37.06%	Blake Desjarlais; 17,457; 40.54%	Thomas Matty; 2,617; 6.08%	Alex Boykowich (Comm.); 140 0.33%	Kerry Diotte
Edmonton Griesbach	Habiba Mohamud; 5,979; 13.89%	Kerry Diotte; 15,957; 37.06%	Blake Desjarlais; 17,457; 40.54%	Thomas Matty; 2,617; 6.08%	Mary Joyce (M-L); 103 0.24%	Kerry Diotte
Edmonton Griesbach	Habiba Mohamud; 5,979; 13.89%	Kerry Diotte; 15,957; 37.06%	Blake Desjarlais; 17,457; 40.54%	Thomas Matty; 2,617; 6.08%	Heather Lau (Green); 538 1.25%	Kerry Diotte
Edmonton Griesbach	Habiba Mohamud; 5,979; 13.89%	Kerry Diotte; 15,957; 37.06%	Blake Desjarlais; 17,457; 40.54%	Thomas Matty; 2,617; 6.08%	Morgan Watson (Libert.); 268 0.62%	Kerry Diotte
Edmonton Manning	Donna Lynn Smith; 10,468; 21.27%	Ziad Aboultaif; 20,219; 41.07%	Charmaine St. Germain; 14,999; 30.47%	Martin Halvorson; 3,407; 6.92%	Andre Vachon (M-L); 133; 0.27%	Ziad Aboultaif
Edmonton Mill Woods	Ben Henderson; 16,499; 34.01%	Tim Uppal; 18,392; 37.91%	Nigel Logan; 10,553; 21.75%	Paul Edward McCormack; 2,898; 5.97%	Naomi Rankin (Comm.); 172; 0.35%	Tim Uppal
Edmonton Riverbend	Tariq Chaudary; 14,169; 24.89%	Matt Jeneroux; 25,702; 45.15%	Shawn Gray; 14,154; 24.86%	Jennifer Peace; 2,142; 3.76%	Melanie Hoffman (Green); 761; 1.34%	Matt Jeneroux
Edmonton Strathcona	Hibo Mohamed; 3,948; 7.56%	Tunde Obasan; 13,310; 25.49%	Heather McPherson; 31,690; 60.68%	Wes Janke; 2,366; 4.53%	Kelly Green (Green); 634 1.21%	Heather McPherson
Edmonton Strathcona	Hibo Mohamed; 3,948; 7.56%	Tunde Obasan; 13,310; 25.49%	Heather McPherson; 31,690; 60.68%	Wes Janke; 2,366; 4.53%	Malcolm Stinson (Libert.); 275 0.53%	Heather McPherson
Edmonton West	Adam Wilson Brown; 13,016; 23.25%	Kelly McCauley; 25,278; 45.15%	Sandra Hunter; 14,190; 25.34%	Brent Kinzel; 3,354; 5.99%	Peggy Morton (M-L); 151; 0.27%	Kelly McCauley
Edmonton—Wetaskiwin	Ron Thiering; 12,229; 14.08%	Mike Lake; 48,340; 55.66%	Hugo Charles; 18,259; 21.03%	Tyler Beauchamp; 7,670; 8.83%	Travis Calliou (VCP); 345; 0.40%	Mike Lake
St. Albert—Edmonton	Greg Springate; 11,188; 17.95%	Michael Cooper; 29,652; 47.56%	Kathleen Mpulubusi; 17,816; 28.58%	Brigitte Cecelia; 3,684; 5.91%		Michael Cooper
Sherwood Park—Fort Saskatchewan	Tanya Holm; 8,730; 12.23%	Garnett Genuis; 41,092; 57.55%	Aidan Bradley Theroux; 14,740; 20.64%	John Wetterstrand; 5,004; 7.01%	Todd Newberry (Mav.); 849 1.19%	Garnett Genuis
Sherwood Park—Fort Saskatchewan	Tanya Holm; 8,730; 12.23%	Garnett Genuis; 41,092; 57.55%	Aidan Bradley Theroux; 14,740; 20.64%	John Wetterstrand; 5,004; 7.01%	Sheldon Jonah Perris (Green); 700 0.98%	Garnett Genuis
Sherwood Park—Fort Saskatchewan	Tanya Holm; 8,730; 12.23%	Garnett Genuis; 41,092; 57.55%	Aidan Bradley Theroux; 14,740; 20.64%	John Wetterstrand; 5,004; 7.01%	Charles Simpson (Ind.); 283 0.40%	Garnett Genuis
Sturgeon River—Parkland	Irene Walker; 4,579; 6.89%	Dane Lloyd; 40,957; 61.61%	Kendra Mills; 12,532; 18.85%	Murray MacKinnon; 6,671; 10.04%	Jeff Dunham (Mav.); 1,240 1.87%	Dane Lloyd
Sturgeon River—Parkland	Irene Walker; 4,579; 6.89%	Dane Lloyd; 40,957; 61.61%	Kendra Mills; 12,532; 18.85%	Murray MacKinnon; 6,671; 10.04%	Jeffrey Willerton (CHP); 497 0.75%	Dane Lloyd

==== Calgary ====
Electoral district	Candidates							Incumbent
Electoral district	Liberal	Conservative	NDP	Green	PPC	Maverick	Other	Incumbent
Calgary Centre	Sabrina Grover; 17,593; 29.71%	Greg McLean; 30,375; 51.30%	Juan Estevez Moreno; 9,694; 16.37%	Austin Mullins; 971; 1.64%			Dawid Pawlowski (CHP); 575; 0.97%	Greg McLean
Calgary Confederation	Murray Sigler; 17,560; 28.49%	Len Webber; 28,367; 46.03%	Gulshan Akter; 10,561; 17.14%	Natalie Odd; 2,295; 3.72%	Edward Gao; 2,670; 4.33%		Kevan Hunter (M-L); 178; 0.29%	Len Webber
Calgary Forest Lawn	Jordan Stein; 9,608; 27.73%	Jasraj Singh Hallan; 15,434; 44.55%	Keira Gunn; 6,254; 18.05%	Carey Rutherford; 699; 2.02%	Dwayne Holub; 2,468; 7.12%		Jonathan Trautman (Comm.); 185; 0.53%	Jasraj Hallan
Calgary Heritage	Scott Forsyth; 8,960; 16.73%	Bob Benzen; 30,870; 57.66%	Kathleen M. Johnson; 9,320; 17.41%	Malka Labell; 766; 1.43%	Bailey Bedard; 2,682; 5.01%	Annelise Freeman; 714; 1.33%	Mark Dejewski (Rhino.); 230; 0.43%	Bob Benzen
Calgary Midnapore	Zarnab Zafar; 7,947; 12.32%	Stephanie Kusie; 39,147; 60.66%	Gurmit Bhachu; 11,826; 18.33%	Shaun T. Pulsifer; 868; 1.35%	Jonathan Hagel; 3,930; 6.09%	Matt Magolan; 812; 1.26%		Stephanie Kusie
Calgary Nose Hill	Jessica Dale-Walker; 10,311; 20.46%	Michelle Rempel Garner; 28,001; 55.57%	Khalis Ahmed; 8,500; 16.87%	Judson Hansell; 636; 1.26%	Kyle Scott; 2,324; 4.61%		Peggy Askin (M-L); 105 0.21%	Michelle Rempel Garner
Calgary Nose Hill	Jessica Dale-Walker; 10,311; 20.46%	Michelle Rempel Garner; 28,001; 55.57%	Khalis Ahmed; 8,500; 16.87%	Judson Hansell; 636; 1.26%	Kyle Scott; 2,324; 4.61%		**Stephen J Garvey** (NCA); 62 0.12%	Michelle Rempel Garner
Calgary Nose Hill	Jessica Dale-Walker; 10,311; 20.46%	Michelle Rempel Garner; 28,001; 55.57%	Khalis Ahmed; 8,500; 16.87%	Judson Hansell; 636; 1.26%	Kyle Scott; 2,324; 4.61%		Larry R. Heather (CHP); 169 0.34%	Michelle Rempel Garner
Calgary Nose Hill	Jessica Dale-Walker; 10,311; 20.46%	Michelle Rempel Garner; 28,001; 55.57%	Khalis Ahmed; 8,500; 16.87%	Judson Hansell; 636; 1.26%	Kyle Scott; 2,324; 4.61%		Vanessa Wang (Rhino.); 285 0.57%	Michelle Rempel Garner
Calgary Rocky Ridge	Shahnaz Munir; 14,693; 22.23%	Pat Kelly; 36,034; 54.53%	Jena Dianne Kieren; 10,748; 16.26%	Catriona Wright; 1,052; 1.59%	Rory MacLeod; 3,003; 4.54%	David Robinson; 554; 0.84%		Pat Kelly
Calgary Shepard	Cam Macdonald; 10,303; 14.01%	Tom Kmiec; 44,411; 60.37%	Raj Jessel; 12,103; 16.45%	Evelyn Tanaka; 1,300; 1.77%	Ron Vaillant; 4,284; 5.82%	Andrea Lee; 874; 1.19%	Jesse Halmo (NCA); 56 0.08%	Tom Kmiec
Calgary Shepard	Cam Macdonald; 10,303; 14.01%	Tom Kmiec; 44,411; 60.37%	Raj Jessel; 12,103; 16.45%	Evelyn Tanaka; 1,300; 1.77%	Ron Vaillant; 4,284; 5.82%	Andrea Lee; 874; 1.19%	Konstantine Muirhead (Ind.); 228 0.31%	Tom Kmiec
Calgary Signal Hill	Shawn Duncan; 11,106; 18.60%	Ron Liepert; 35,217; 58.98%	Patrick King; 8,863; 14.84%	Keiran Corrigall; 1,094; 1.83%	Nick Debrey; 2,859; 4.79%	Ajay Copp; 568; 0.95%		Ron Liepert
Calgary Skyview	George Chahal; 20,092; 42.36%	Jag Sahota; 17,111; 36.07%	Gurinder Singh Gill; 7,690; 16.21%	Janna So; 432; 0.91%	Harry Dhillon; 1,720; 3.63%		Lee Aquart (Ind.); 184 0.39%	Jag Sahota
Calgary Skyview	George Chahal; 20,092; 42.36%	Jag Sahota; 17,111; 36.07%	Gurinder Singh Gill; 7,690; 16.21%	Janna So; 432; 0.91%	Harry Dhillon; 1,720; 3.63%		Daniel Blanchard (M-L); 111 0.23%	Jag Sahota
Calgary Skyview	George Chahal; 20,092; 42.36%	Jag Sahota; 17,111; 36.07%	Gurinder Singh Gill; 7,690; 16.21%	Janna So; 432; 0.91%	Harry Dhillon; 1,720; 3.63%		Nadeem Rana (Cent.); 93 0.20%	Jag Sahota

=== British Columbia ===
==== BC Interior ====
Electoral district	Candidates						Incumbent
Electoral district	Liberal	Conservative	NDP	Green	PPC	Other	Incumbent
Cariboo—Prince George	Garth Frizzell; 8,397; 16.56%	Todd Doherty; 25,771; 50.82%	Audrey McKinnon; 10,323; 20.36%	Leigh Hunsinger-Chang; 1,844; 3.64%	Jeremy Gustafson; 4,160; 8.20%	Henry Thiessen (CHP); 218; 0.43%	Todd Doherty
Central Okanagan—Similkameen—Nicola	Sarah Eves; 13,291; 20.70%	Dan Albas; 30,563; 47.60%	Joan Phillip; 13,813; 21.51%	Brennan Wauters; 1,755; 2.73%	Kathryn Mcdonald; 4,788; 7.46%		Dan Albas
Kamloops—Thompson—Cariboo	Jesse McCormick; 12,717; 18.05%	Frank Caputo; 30,281; 42.98%	Bill Sundhu; 20,431; 29.00%	Iain Currie; 2,576; 3.66%	Corally Delwo; 4,033; 5.72%	Wayne Allan (Ind.); 146 0.21%	Cathy McLeod†
Kamloops—Thompson—Cariboo	Jesse McCormick; 12,717; 18.05%	Frank Caputo; 30,281; 42.98%	Bill Sundhu; 20,431; 29.00%	Iain Currie; 2,576; 3.66%	Corally Delwo; 4,033; 5.72%	Bob O'Brien (Ind.); 264 0.37%	Cathy McLeod†
Kelowna—Lake Country	Tim Krupa; 17,767; 26.46%	Tracy Gray; 30,409; 45.29%	Cade Desjarlais; 12,204; 18.18%	Imre Szeman; 2,074; 3.09%	Brian Rogers; 4,688; 6.98%		Tracy Gray
Kootenay—Columbia	Robin Goldsbury; 5,879; 9.05%	Rob Morrison; 28,056; 43.19%	Wayne Stetski; 23,986; 36.92%	Rana Nelson; 2,577; 3.97%	Sarah Bennett; 4,467; 6.88%		Rob Morrison
North Okanagan—Shuswap	Shelley Desautels; 13,666; 18.88%	Mel Arnold; 33,626; 46.45%	Ron Johnston; 13,929; 19.24%	Andrea Gunner; 3,967; 5.48%	Kyle Delfing; 7,209; 9.96%		Mel Arnold
Prince George—Peace River—Northern Rockies	Amir Alavi; 4,236; 8.61%	Bob Zimmer; 29,882; 60.74%	Cory Grizz Longley; 6,647; 13.51%	Catharine Kendall; 1,661; 3.38%	Ryan Dyck; 5,138; 10.44%	Phil Hewkin (CFF); 53 0.11%	Bob Zimmer
Prince George—Peace River—Northern Rockies	Amir Alavi; 4,236; 8.61%	Bob Zimmer; 29,882; 60.74%	Cory Grizz Longley; 6,647; 13.51%	Catharine Kendall; 1,661; 3.38%	Ryan Dyck; 5,138; 10.44%	David Jeffers (Mav.); 1,580 3.21%	Bob Zimmer
Skeena—Bulkley Valley	Lakhwinder Jhaj; 2,866; 7.66%	Claire Rattee; 13,513; 36.14%	Taylor Bachrach; 15,921; 42.58%	Adeana Young; 1,406; 3.76%	Jody Craven; 2,888; 7.72%	**Rod Taylor** (CHP); 797; 2.13%	Taylor Bachrach
South Okanagan—West Kootenay	Ken Robertson; 8,159; 12.22%	Helena Konanz; 23,675; 35.45%	Richard Cannings; 27,595; 41.32%	Tara Howse; 2,485; 3.72%	Sean Taylor; 4,866; 7.29%		Richard Cannings

==== Fraser Valley and Southern Lower Mainland ====
Electoral district	Candidates						Incumbent
Electoral district	Liberal	Conservative	NDP	Green	PPC	Other	Incumbent
Abbotsford	Navreen Gill; 10,907; 24.21%	Ed Fast; 21,597; 47.94%	dharmasena yakandawela 7,729; 17.16%	Stephen Fowler; 1,517; 3.37%	Kevin Sinclair; 3,300; 7.33%		Ed Fast
Chilliwack—Hope	Kelly Velonis; 8,851; 16.97%	Mark Strahl; 23,987; 45.99%	DJ Pohl; 13,927; 26.70%	Arthur Green; 1,391; 2.67%	Rob Bogunovic; 4,004; 7.68%		Mark Strahl
Cloverdale—Langley City	John Aldag; 20,877; 39.21%	Tamara Jansen; 19,223; 36.10%	Rajesh Jayaprakash; 10,587; 19.88%		Ian Kennedy; 2,563; 4.81%		Tamara Jansen
Delta	Carla Qualtrough; 22,105; 42.26%	Garry Shearer; 17,695; 33.83%	Monika Dean; 9,591; 18.34%	Jeremy Smith; 1,244; 2.38%	Paul Tarasenko; 1,291; 2.47%	Hong Yan Pan (Ind.); 379; 0.72%	Carla Qualtrough
Fleetwood—Port Kells	Ken Hardie; 21,350; 45.25%	Dave Hayer; 14,553; 30.84%	Raji Toor; 8,960; 18.99%	Perry DeNure; 892; 1.89%	Amrit Birring; 1,284; 2.72%	Murali Krishnan (Ind.); 146; 0.31%	Ken Hardie
Langley—Aldergrove	Kim Richter; 16,565; 26.45%	Tako Van Popta; 28,643; 45.73%	Michael Chang; 12,288; 19.62%	Kaija Farstad; 1,798; 2.87%	Rayna Boychuk; 3,341; 5.33%		Tako van Popta
Mission—Matsqui—Fraser Canyon	Geet Grewal; 10,598; 24.55%	Brad Vis; 18,908; 43.79%	Lynn Perrin; 8,709; 20.17%	Nicole Bellay; 1,887; 4.37%	Tyler Niles; 3,073; 7.12%		Brad Vis
Pitt Meadows—Maple Ridge	Ahmed Yousef; 13,179; 24.94%	Marc Dalton; 19,371; 36.66%	Phil Klapwyk; 16,869; 31.93%		Juliuss Hoffmann; 2,800; 5.30%	Peter Buddle (Rhino.); 161 0.30%	Marc Dalton
Pitt Meadows—Maple Ridge	Ahmed Yousef; 13,179; 24.94%	Marc Dalton; 19,371; 36.66%	Phil Klapwyk; 16,869; 31.93%		Juliuss Hoffmann; 2,800; 5.30%	Steven William Ranta (Ind.); 453 0.86%	Marc Dalton
Richmond Centre	Wilson Miao; 13,440; 39.34%	Alice Wong; 12,668; 37.08%	Sandra Nixon; 6,196; 18.14%	Laura Gillanders; 1,109; 3.25%	James Hinton; 748; 2.19%		Alice Wong
South Surrey—White Rock	Gordie Hogg; 22,166; 38.95%	Kerry-Lynne Findlay; 24,158; 42.45%	June Liu; 8,395; 14.75%		Gary Jensen; 2,186; 3.84%		Kerry-Lynne Findlay
Steveston—Richmond East	Parm Bains; 16,543; 42.47%	Kenny Chiu; 13,066; 33.55%	Jack Trovato; 7,525; 19.32%	Françoise Raunet; 860; 2.21%	Jennifer Singh; 955; 2.45%		Kenny Chiu
Surrey Centre	Randeep Sarai; 16,862; 43.93%	Tina Bains; 8,094; 21.09%	Sonia Andhi; 10,627; 27.68%	Felix Kongyuy; 838; 2.18%	Joe Kennedy; 1,539; 4.01%	Ryan Abbott (Comm.); 137 0.36%	Randeep Sarai
Surrey Centre	Randeep Sarai; 16,862; 43.93%	Tina Bains; 8,094; 21.09%	Sonia Andhi; 10,627; 27.68%	Felix Kongyuy; 838; 2.18%	Joe Kennedy; 1,539; 4.01%	Kevin Pielak (CHP); 289 0.75%	Randeep Sarai
Surrey—Newton	Sukh Dhaliwal; 19,721; 53.87%	Syed Mohsin; 5,758; 15.73%	Avneet Johal; 9,536; 26.05%		Pamela Singh; 967; 2.64%	Parveer Hundal (Ind.); 628; 1.72%	Sukh Dhaliwal

==== Northern Lower Mainland ====
Electoral district	Candidates						Incumbent
Electoral district	Liberal	Conservative	NDP	Green	PPC	Other	Incumbent
Burnaby North—Seymour	Terry Beech; 19,445; 39.54%	Kelsey Shein; 12,535; 25.49%	Jim Hanson; 14,318; 29.11%	Peter Dolling; 1,516; 3.08%	Brad Nickerson; 1,370; 2.79%		Terry Beech
Burnaby South	Brea Huang Sami; 12,361; 30.44%	Likky Lavji; 9,104; 22.42%	**Jagmeet Singh**; 16,382; 40.34%	Maureen Curran; 1,175; 2.89%	Marcella Williams; 1,290; 3.18%	Martin Kendell (Ind.); 296; 0.73%	**Jagmeet Singh**
Coquitlam—Port Coquitlam	Ron McKinnon; 21,454; 38.51%	Katerina Anastasiadis; 16,907; 30.34%	Laura Dupont; 14,982; 26.89%		Kimberly Brundell; 2,373; 4.26%		Ron McKinnon
New Westminster—Burnaby	Rozina Jaffer; 11,685; 23.69%	Paige Munro; 9,710; 19.69%	Peter Julian; 24,054; 48.77%	David Macdonald; 2,035; 4.13%	Kevin Heide; 1,840; 3.73%		Peter Julian
North Vancouver	Jonathan Wilkinson; 26,756; 45.10%	Les Jickling; 16,671; 28.10%	Tammy Bentz; 11,750; 19.81%	Archie Kaario; 2,598; 4.38%	John Galloway; 1,545; 2.60%		Jonathan Wilkinson
Port Moody—Coquitlam	Will Davis; 14,231; 27.32%	Nelly Shin; 16,605; 31.88%	Bonita Zarrillo; 19,367; 37.18%		Desta McPherson; 1,766; 3.39%	Roland Verrier (M-L); 122; 0.23%	Nelly Shin
West Vancouver—Sunshine Coast—Sea to Sky Country	Patrick Weiler; 21,500; 33.88%	John Weston; 19,062; 30.04%	Avi Lewis; 16,265; 25.63%	Mike Simpson; 4,108; 6.47%	Doug Bebb; 2,299; 3.62%	Terry Grimwood (Ind.); 50 0.08%	Patrick Weiler
West Vancouver—Sunshine Coast—Sea to Sky Country	Patrick Weiler; 21,500; 33.88%	John Weston; 19,062; 30.04%	Avi Lewis; 16,265; 25.63%	Mike Simpson; 4,108; 6.47%	Doug Bebb; 2,299; 3.62%	Gordon Jeffrey (Rhino.); 98 0.15%	Patrick Weiler
West Vancouver—Sunshine Coast—Sea to Sky Country	Patrick Weiler; 21,500; 33.88%	John Weston; 19,062; 30.04%	Avi Lewis; 16,265; 25.63%	Mike Simpson; 4,108; 6.47%	Doug Bebb; 2,299; 3.62%	Chris MacGregor (Ind.); 77 0.12%	Patrick Weiler

==== Vancouver ====
Electoral district	Candidates						Incumbent
Electoral district	Liberal	Conservative	NDP	Green	PPC	Other	Incumbent
Vancouver Centre	Hedy Fry; 20,873; 40.44%	Harry Cockell; 11,162; 21.62%	Breen Ouellette; 15,869; 30.74%	Alaric Paivarinta; 2,030; 3.93%	Taylor Singleton-Fookes; 1,683; 3.26%		Hedy Fry
Vancouver East	Josh Vander Vies; 9,797; 19.76%	Mauro Francis; 5,399; 10.89%	Jenny Kwan; 27,969; 56.40%	Cheryl Matthew; 3,826; 7.72%	Karin Litzcke; 1,382; 2.79%	Gölök Buday (Libert.); 831 1.68%	Jenny Kwan
Vancouver East	Josh Vander Vies; 9,797; 19.76%	Mauro Francis; 5,399; 10.89%	Jenny Kwan; 27,969; 56.40%	Cheryl Matthew; 3,826; 7.72%	Karin Litzcke; 1,382; 2.79%	Natasha Hale (Comm.); 387 0.78%	Jenny Kwan
Vancouver Granville	Taleeb Noormohamed; 17,050; 34.40%	Kailin Che; 13,280; 26.80%	Anjali Appadurai; 16,619; 33.53%	Imtiaz Popat; 1,434; 2.89%	Damian Jewett; 1,177; 2.37%		Jody Wilson-Raybould†
Vancouver Kingsway	Virginia Bremner; 11,022; 27.45%	Carson Binda; 5,456; 13.59%	Don Davies; 20,994; 52.28%	Farrukh Chishtie; 1,575; 3.92%	Jeremy MacKenzie; 868; 2.16%	Kimball Cariou (Comm.); 175 0.44%	Don Davies
Vancouver Kingsway	Virginia Bremner; 11,022; 27.45%	Carson Binda; 5,456; 13.59%	Don Davies; 20,994; 52.28%	Farrukh Chishtie; 1,575; 3.92%	Jeremy MacKenzie; 868; 2.16%	Donna Petersen (M-L); 68 0.17%	Don Davies
Vancouver Quadra	Joyce Murray; 20,814; 43.63%	Brad Armstrong; 13,786; 28.90%	Naden Abenes; 9,220; 19.33%	Devyani Singh; 2,922; 6.13%	Renate Siekmann; 963; 2.02%		Joyce Murray
Vancouver South	Harjit S. Sajjan; 19,910; 49.43%	Sukhbir Singh Gill; 9,060; 22.49%	Sean McQuillan; 9,922; 24.63%		Anthony Cook; 1,104; 2.74%	Anne Jamieson (M-L); 287; 0.71%	Harjit Sajjan

==== Vancouver Island ====
Electoral district	Candidates						Incumbent
Electoral district	Liberal	Conservative	NDP	Green	PPC	Other	Incumbent
Courtenay—Alberni	Susan Farlinger; 9,276; 13.39%	Mary Lee; 22,181; 32.03%	Gord Johns; 30,612; 44.21%	Susanne Lawson; 3,590; 5.18%	Robert Eppich; 3,467; 5.01%	Barbara Biley (M-L); 124; 0.18%	Gord Johns
Cowichan—Malahat—Langford	Blair Herbert; 10,320; 16.37%	Alana DeLong; 17,870; 28.35%	Alistair MacGregor; 26,968; 42.78%	Lia Versaevel; 3,922; 6.22%	Mark Hecht; 3,952; 6.27%		Alistair MacGregor
Esquimalt—Saanich—Sooke	Doug Kobayashi; 14,466; 22.07%	Laura Anne Frost; 13,885; 21.18%	Randall Garrison; 28,056; 42.81%	Harley Gordon; 5,891; 8.99%	Rob Anderson; 2,995; 4.57%	Tyson Riel Strandlund (Comm.); 249; 0.38%	Randall Garrison
Nanaimo—Ladysmith	Michelle Corfield; 9,314; 13.54%	Tamara Kronis; 18,627; 27.09%	Lisa Marie Barron; 19,826; 28.83%	Paul Manly; 17,640; 25.65%	Stephen Welton; 3,358; 4.88%		Paul Manly
North Island—Powell River	Jennifer Grenz; 7,922; 13.15%	Shelley Downey; 21,670; 35.96%	Rachel Blaney; 23,833; 39.55%	Jessica Wegg; 3,656; 6.07%	Paul Macknight; 2,795; 4.64%	Stacey Gastis (Mav.); 310 0.51%	Rachel Blaney
North Island—Powell River	Jennifer Grenz; 7,922; 13.15%	Shelley Downey; 21,670; 35.96%	Rachel Blaney; 23,833; 39.55%	Jessica Wegg; 3,656; 6.07%	Paul Macknight; 2,795; 4.64%	Carla Neal (M-L); 77 0.13%	Rachel Blaney
Saanich—Gulf Islands	Sherri Moore-Arbour; 12,056; 18.40%	David Busch; 14,775; 22.55%	Sabina Singh; 11,959; 18.25%	Elizabeth May; 24,648; 37.62%	David Hilderman; 1,943; 2.97%	Dock Currie (Comm.); 141; 0.22%	Elizabeth May
Victoria	Nikki Macdonald; 18,194; 27.26%	Hannah Hodson; 9,152; 13.71%	Laurel Collins; 29,301; 43.90%	Nick Loughton; 7,472; 11.19%	John Randal Phipps; 2,065; 3.09%	Jordan Reichert (Animal); 273 0.41%	Laurel Collins
Victoria	Nikki Macdonald; 18,194; 27.26%	Hannah Hodson; 9,152; 13.71%	Laurel Collins; 29,301; 43.90%	Nick Loughton; 7,472; 11.19%	John Randal Phipps; 2,065; 3.09%	Janis Zroback (Comm.); 291 0.44%	Laurel Collins

=== Nunavut ===
Electoral district	Candidates			Incumbent
Electoral district	Liberal	Conservative	NDP	Incumbent
Nunavut	Pat Angnakak; 2,578; 35.86%	Laura Mackenzie; 1,184; 16.47%	Lori Idlout; 3,427; 47.67%	Mumilaaq Qaqqaq$

=== Northwest Territories ===
Electoral district	Candidates					Incumbent
Electoral district	Liberal	Conservative	NDP	Green	Independent	Incumbent
Northwest Territories	Michael McLeod; 5,387; 38.22%	Lea Anne Mollison; 2,031; 14.41%	Kelvin Kotchilea; 4,558; 32.34%	Roland Laufer; 328; 2.33%	Jane Groenewegen; 1,791; 12.71%	Michael McLeod

=== Yukon ===
Electoral district	Candidates					Incumbent
Electoral district	Liberal	Conservative	NDP	Green	Independent	Incumbent
Yukon	Brendan Hanley; 6,471; 33.35%	Barbara Dunlop; 5,096; 26.26%	Lisa Vollans-Leduc; 4,354; 22.44%	Lenore Morris; 846; 4.36%	Jonas Jacot Smith; 2,639; 13.60%	Larry Bagnell$
