= Brampton—Chinguacousy Park =

Federal electoral district in Ontario, Canada

Ontario electoral district
- Interactive map of riding boundaries from the 2025 federal election

Federal electoral district
- Legislature: House of Commons
MP
Shafqat Ali
Liberal
- District created: 2023
- First contested: 2025

Demographics
- Population (2021): 115,568
- Electors (2025): 68,731
- Census division: Peel
- Census subdivision: Brampton (part)

Brampton—Chinguacousy Park is a federal electoral district in Ontario, Canada. It came into effect upon the call of the 2025 Canadian federal election.

== Geography ==
Under the 2022 Canadian federal electoral redistribution the riding will largely replace Brampton Centre in areas east of Highway 410 plus the neighbourhoods of Westgate, Central Park, and Northgate plus all of Sandringham-Wellington east of Dixie Road and south of Sandalwood Parkway from the Brampton North riding.

The riding name refers to Donald M. Gordon Chinguacousy Park.

== Demographics ==
According to the 2021 Canadian census

Languages: 57.1% English, 15.8% Punjabi, 2.9% Urdu, 2.8% Spanish, 2.5% Hindi, 2.3% Tagalog, 2.1% Gujarati, 1.3% Tamil, 1.2% French, 1.1% Italian

Religions: 45.1% Christian (21.9% Catholic, 2.4% Anglican, 2.3% Pentecostal, 1.9% United Church, 1.1% Christian Orthodox, 15.5% Other), 17.5% Sikh, 13.9% No religion, 13.1% Hindu, 8.6% Muslim, 1.2% Buddhist

Median income: $36,800 (2020)

Average income: $43,840 (2020)

Panethnic groups in Brampton—Chinguacousy Park (2021)
Panethnic group	2021	
Panethnic group	Pop.	%
South Asian	44,955	39.22%
European (Note: Statistic includes all persons that did not make up part of a visible minority or an indigenous identity.)	31,340	27.34%
African	16,165	14.1%
Southeast Asian (Note: Statistic includes total responses of "Filipino" and "Southeast Asian" under visible minority section on census.)	6,650	5.8%
Latin American	4,620	4.03%
Middle Eastern (Note: Statistic includes total responses of "West Asian" and "Arab" under visible minority section on census.)	2,435	2.12%
East Asian (Note: Statistic includes total responses of "Chinese", "Korean", and "Japanese" under visible minority section on census.)	1,605	1.4%
Indigenous	1,045	0.91%
Other/multiracial (Note: Statistic includes total responses of "Visible minority, n.i.e." and "Multiple visible minorities" under visible minority section on census.)	6,145	5.36%
Total responses	114,610	99.17%
Total population	115,565	100%
Notes: Totals greater than 100% due to multiple origin responses. Demographics based on 2022 Canadian federal electoral redistribution riding boundaries.

== History ==
Parliament	Years	Member	Party
Brampton—Chinguacousy Park; Riding created from Brampton Centre and Brampton North
45th	2025–present	Shafqat Ali	Liberal

== Electoral Results ==
2025 Canadian federal election
Party	Candidate	Votes	%	±%	Expenditures
Liberal	Shafqat Ali	21,532	48.8	–1.98	
Conservative	Tim Iqbal	19,591	44.4	+13.46	
New Democratic	Teresa Yeh	1,173	2.7	–14.16	
People's	Jayesh Brahmbhatt	741	1.7	N/A	
Green	Mike Dancy	521	1.2	N/A	
Independent	Avi Dhaliwal	328	0.7	N/A	
Centrist	Hafiz Muneeb Ahmad	194	0.4	N/A	
Total valid votes/expense limit		44,080			
Total rejected ballots		473			
Turnout		44,553	63.69		
Eligible voters		69,958			
Liberal hold		Swing		–7.72	
Source: Elections Canada

2021 federal election redistributed results
Party	Vote	%
Liberal	19,553	50.81
Conservative	11,933	31.01
New Democratic	6,473	16.82
Others	526	1.37

== See also ==
- List of Canadian electoral districts
