= Gurbax Singh Malhi =

Canadian politician (born 1949)

The Honourable Gurbax Singh Malhi PC

Member of Parliament for Bramalea—Gore—Malton
- In office 1993–2011
- Preceded by: Harry Chadwick
- Succeeded by: Bal Gosal

Personal details
- Born: 12 October 1949 (age 76) Chugha Kalan, Moga district, Punjab, India
- Party: Liberal Party of Canada
- Spouse: Devinder Malhi
- Children: 2 including Harinder
- Profession: Realtor
- Website: gurbaxsinghmalhi.liberal.ca

Gurbax Singh Malhi (born 12 October 1949) is an Indian-born Canadian politician. A Liberal, he was first elected as the Member of Parliament for Bramalea—Gore—Malton in 1993, and served as its representative in the House of Commons for 18 consecutive years until his defeat in the 2011 election.

Malhi is notable for being the first turban-wearing Sikh to be elected to the House of Commons of Canada, or any national legislature in the western world.

== Member of Parliament ==
Malhi was first elected to the House of Commons in the federal election of 1993, defeating Progressive Conservative (PC) incumbent Harry Chadwick and in the Peel Region riding of Bramalea—Gore—Malton. Prior to 1993, Canadian law prohibited members of Parliament from wearing headgear of any sort in the House of Commons. Malhi's insistence on wearing a turban caused the law to be changed shortly after the election.

Malhi was re-elected in the 1997 election over Reform candidate Darlene Florence and PC candidate Beryl Ford. He was re-elected with the greatest majority of his career in the 2000 federal election over Canadian Alliance candidate Gurdish Mangat and PC candidate Danny Varaich. He was re-elected again with a significant plurality over Conservative Raminder Singh Gill in the 2004 election, despite the fact that his riding was a key Conservative target. In the 2006 federal election, Malhi was elected over Conservative candidate John Sprovieri and NDP candidate Cesar Martello. Malhi was elected for the sixth time in the 2008 election over Conservative candidate Stella Ambler and NDP candidate Jash Puniya.

In 2002, he became the recipient of the Queen's Golden Jubilee Medal for his commitment and contributions to Canadian society. In 2003, he was appointed for life to the Queen's Privy Council for Canada by Prime Minister Paul Martin.

Gurbax Singh Malhi served as Parliamentary Secretary to the Minister of Labour from 2001 to 2003. From 2003 to 2004, Malhi served as Parliamentary Secretary to the Minister of Industry with special emphasis on Entrepreneurs and New Canadians. In 2004 he was named Parliamentary Secretary to the Minister of Human Resources and Skills Development and he served in this capacity until 2005. In 2005, Gurbax Singh Malhi also acted as Parliamentary Secretary to the Minister of Human Resources and Skills Development and Minister responsible for Democratic Renewal. From 2005 to 2006, he also served as Parliamentary Secretary to the Minister of National Revenue.

In 2005, Malhi was among 32 Liberal Party backbenchers who voted against the Civil Marriage Act, despite the Liberal government being officially in favour of its adoption. In a House of Commons debate, he encouraged MPs to vote to maintain the definition of marriage as between one man and one woman "in keeping with the natural law and in conformity with God's design for the world" and downplayed discrimination against same-sex couples, stating that "just because differences exist in society, it does not mean that inequality and discrimination exist.”

In the 2011 federal election, the Liberal Party won the fewest seats in its history. Falling to third place, Malhi was defeated by Conservative Bal Gosal. Jagmeet Singh, the future leader of the NDP, finished in second. Like Malhi, Singh would be a trend-setter for Canadian Sikhs when he became the first turban-wearing, visible minority party leader in 2017.

During the 2014 Ontario general election, he campaigned for his daughter Harinder Malhi, who contested and won the seat for Brampton—Springdale for the Ontario Liberal Party, becoming a Member of Provincial Parliament in the 41st Legislative Assembly of Ontario.

== Electoral record ==
=== Bramalea—Gore—Malton ===
2011 Canadian federal election
Party	Candidate	Votes	%	±%	Expenditures
Conservative	Baljit (Bal) Gosal	19,907	34.44%	-2.68%	–
New Democratic	Jagmeet Singh Dhaliwal	19,368	33.51%	+24.49%	–
Liberal	Gurbax Singh Malhi	16,402	29.40%	-15.65%	–
Green	John Moulton	1,748	3.02%	-2.14%	–
Marxist–Leninist	Frank Chilelli	371	0.64%	+0.02%	
Total valid votes		57,796	100.00%	–	
Total rejected ballots		–	–	–	
Turnout		–	–	–	–

Source: Elections Canada

2008 Canadian federal election
Party	Candidate	Votes	%	±%	Expenditures
Liberal	Gurbax Malhi	22,214	45.0%	-5.7%	$85,496
Conservative	Stella Ambler	18,350	37.2%	+4.6%	$91,704
New Democratic	Jash Puniya	5,935	12.0%	-0.8%	$21,613
Green	Mark Pajot	2,545	5.2%	+1.8%	$869
Marxist–Leninist	Frank Chilelli	309	0.6%	+0.1%	
Total valid votes/Expense limit		29,353	100.0%	$97,671	

2006 Canadian federal election
Party	Candidate	Votes	%	±%
Liberal	Gurbax Malhi	25,349	50.7%	+1.2%
Conservative	John Sprovieri	16,310	32.6%	+2.0%
New Democratic	Cesar Martello	6,400	12.8%	-2.1%
Green	Ernst Braendli	1,721	3.4%	-1.1%
Marxist–Leninist	Frank Chilelli	233	0.5%	-0.1%
Total valid votes		50,013	100.0%	

2004 Canadian federal election
Party	Candidate	Votes	%	±%
Liberal	Gurbax Malhi	20,394	49.5%	-7.5%
Conservative	Raminder Gill	12,594	30.6%	-3.9%
New Democratic	Fernando Miranda	6,113	14.95%	10.0%
Green	Sharleen McDowall	1,832	4.5%	
Marxist–Leninist	Frank Chilelli	237	0.6%	-0.1%
Total valid votes		41,170	100.0%	

Note: Conservative vote is compared to the total of the Canadian Alliance vote and Progressive Conservative vote in 2004 election.

=== Bramalea—Gore—Malton—Springdale ===
2000 Canadian federal election
Party	Candidate	Votes	%	±%
Liberal	Gurbax Malhi	21,917	57.1%	+10.7%
Alliance	Gurdish Mangat	7,214	18.8%	-2.5%
Progressive Conservative	Danny Varaich	6,019	15.7%	-10.4%
New Democratic	Vishnu Roche	1,864	4.9%	-0.7%
Independent	Gurinder Malhi	783	2.0%	
Communist	Jim R. Bridgewood	350	0.9%	
Marxist–Leninist	David Greig	269	0.7%	0.0%
Total valid votes		38,416	100.0%	

Note: Canadian Alliance vote is compared to the Reform vote in 1997 election.

=== Bramalea—Gore—Malton ===
1997 Canadian federal election
Party	Candidate	Votes	%	±%
Liberal	Gurbax Malhi	18,933	46.4%	+3.5%
Progressive Conservative	Beryl Ford	10,655	26.1%	+7.1%
Reform	Darlene Florence	8,685	21.3%	-8.2%
New Democratic	Abdul Majeed	2,281	5.6%	+0.5%
Marxist–Leninist	Philip Fernandez	279	0.7%	+0.5%
Total valid votes		40,833	100.0%	

1993 Canadian federal election
Party	Candidate	Votes	%	±%
Liberal	Gurbax Malhi	16,530	42.9%	+8.5%
Reform	Darlene Florence	11,376	29.5%	
Progressive Conservative	Harry Chadwick	7,338	19.0%	-22.5%
New Democratic	Paul Ledgister	1,977	5.1%	-17.3%
National	Jack Ardis	480	1.2%	
Natural Law	Bill Davies	279	0.7%	
Independent	John E. Maxwell	261	0.7%	
Green	Bill Emms	215	0.6%	
Marxist–Leninist	Iqbai Sumbal	89	0.2%	-0.1%
Total valid votes		38,545	100.0%	

Note that all electoral information is taken from Elections Canada.
