= Raj Grewal =

Canadian politician

Member of Parliament for Brampton East
- In office October 19, 2015 – September 11, 2019
- Preceded by: Bal Gosal
- Succeeded by: Maninder Sidhu

Personal details
- Born: September 11, 1985 (age 41) Calgary, Alberta
- Party: Independent
- Other political affiliations: Liberal (2015–2018)
- Spouse: Shikha Kasal
- Children: 2
- Education: Wilfrid Laurier University (BBA); Schulich School of Business, York University (MBA); Osgoode Hall Law School (JD)
- Profession: Attorney

Rajvinder Grewal (born September 11, 1985) is a former Canadian politician who represented the riding of Brampton East in the House of Commons of Canada from 2015 to 2019. Elected as a Liberal in the 2015 Canadian federal election, he resigned from caucus in 2018 after a police investigation into his extensive gambling debts, and did not stand in the 2019 Canadian federal election. In September 2020, he was charged by the Royal Canadian Mounted Police for breach of trust and fraud over $5,000.

== Before politics ==
The son of an airport cab driver, Grewal attended Wilfrid Laurier University, where he earned a bachelor's degree in business, and then completed an MBA at York University's Schulich School of Business and a law degree at Osgoode Hall Law School. Prior to his legal studies he worked as a financial analyst, while after becoming a lawyer he specialized in mergers, acquisitions and corporate finance on Bay Street.

== Federal politics ==
Grewal's nomination to represent the Liberal Party of Canada in the 2015 election in Brampton East was attended by some controversy, as initial media reports indicated that a brawl took place at the nominating convention when several hundred members were denied the ability to vote. Police attended the scene in a crowd control capacity. Liberal Party officials subsequently denied that there had been any fighting at the scene.

In early 2018, the Ethics Commissioner launched an investigation into whether Grewal violated the conflict-of-interest code when he invited Yusuf Yenilmez, the head of Zgemi Inc., to multiple events during Justin Trudeau’s trip to India. Grewal had been paid by Zgemi Inc. for legal advice during the previous year.

According to his most recent disclosure to the Ethics Commissioner, Grewal had lines of credit with Royal Bank of Canada, Toronto Dominion Bank and Bank of Nova Scotia, as well as the joint mortgage with HSBC Canada. In addition, Mr. Grewal disclosed that he had received employment income from Zgemi Inc. and a law firm called Gahir & Associates during his time in the House. Parliamentary rules do not require members of Parliament (MPs) to reveal the amounts they were paid, and there is no threshold for disclosure. Backbenchers are subject to fewer rules than ministers in terms of disclosure.

Grewal was a member of the influential finance committee of the House of Commons, before being moved to the health committee in September 2018.

== Departure from Liberal caucus ==
Grewal announced on November 22, 2018 that he intended to resign as MP and was leaving federal politics for personal and medical reasons. A statement released the next day by a spokesperson for the Prime Minister's Office clarified that Grewal was resigning to seek treatment for problem gambling which had "led him to incur significant personal debts." Grewal reportedly gambled millions of dollars between 2015 and 2018, including at the Casino du Lac-Leamy. The casino's disclosure to FINTRAC then led to an RCMP investigation.

In a statement on November 26, 2018 the Office of the Ethics Commissioner said its investigation "will continue as soon as possible in spite of [Grewal’s] resignation." In its official comment the week before, the Prime Minister’s Office said it was aware "of inquiries by the RCMP regarding the circumstances that were the subject of a complaint to the Ethics Commissioner about Mr. Grewal earlier this year." The RCMP's national division would not confirm or deny that it is investigating Grewal.

On November 30, 2018, Grewal announced that he was quitting the Liberal caucus but would keep his seat in the House of Commons "for the time being." In a December 2018 Facebook video, Grewal said that in a three-year period at Lac-Leamy, playing recreational blackjack became a high-stakes gambling problem, which led him to incur high levels of debt that he kept hidden from his family. Grewal claimed that he only borrowed money from loved ones in a legal manner. On January 25, 2019, he announced that he would keep his seat in parliament as an Independent MP until the next federal election in October. Grewal did not stand for re-election in the 2019 federal election.

== Legal issues ==
In September 2020, Grewal was charged by the RCMP with four counts of breach of trust and one count of fraud over $5,000 under the Criminal Code. The RCMP allege that Grewal received millions in personal loans that he neglected to report to the Ethics Commissioner, which would constitute a criminal breach of trust. The RCMP also allege that Grewal misused his constituency office budget for personal use and solicited loans that personally benefited him in connection with using his office as an MP. In March 2023, the last charges against Grewal were dismissed by the Ontario Superior Court.

In February 2024, Grewal sued the RCMP and the Ontario attorney general for $50 million over their alleged mishandling of the case.

Legal and regulatory proceedings involving Grewal and associated businesses

Beginning in 2025, Raj Grewal, RSG Law Professional Corporation, a law firm he founded, and various individuals and companies associated with his real-estate activities became involved in a series of civil and regulatory proceedings concerning real-estate financing, mortgage transactions and the handling of funds held in trust. Grewal has denied wrongdoing in connection with the matters, and his lawyers have said that he had limited involvement in RSG Law’s day-to-day operations after transferring ownership of the firm to lawyer Davinder Singh Khattra in 2024. Many of the allegations contained in the civil proceedings have not been proven in court.

RSG Law and the WIGI litigation

One of the disputes arose from the 2025 sale of a nearly 100-acre property near Brantford. WIGI Restructured Bond Corporation, which held a mortgage on the property, commenced proceedings involving RSG Law, Khattra, Grewal’s father Avtar Singh Grewal and other defendants. WIGI alleged that approximately $11.7 million from the June 2025 property sale was received and disbursed through RSG Law without WIGI’s approximately $3.6-million mortgage being repaid.

In April 2026, WIGI obtained interlocutory orders freezing accounts and requiring information concerning the disposition of the sale proceeds. On May 25, 2026, WIGI filed a $5.5-million action alleging fraud, conspiracy, breach of trust and related causes of action against RSG Law, Khattra, Avtar Grewal and other defendants. Raj Grewal was not personally named as a defendant in that action and the claim did not allege wrongdoing by him personally. The allegations in the lawsuit remained unproven.

Scotiabank proceedings and RSG Law trust account

RSG Law also became involved in Ontario Superior Court proceedings initiated by Scotiabank after the bank identified fraudulent cheques deposited into accounts belonging to another law firm. Court records reviewed by media organizations indicated that more than $3.3 million derived from the questioned transactions subsequently entered an RSG Law trust account before portions of the money were transferred elsewhere.

Scotiabank obtained orders restricting access to accounts while the transactions were investigated. The original Scotiabank filings did not allege that RSG Law itself created the fraudulent cheques, and RSG Law, through counsel, denied wrongdoing and said that it had become caught up in fraudulent transactions initiated elsewhere.

Sellers lawsuit and Mareva injunction

In June 2026, Lindsay and Casey Sellers commenced a separate action against RSG Law and Khattra concerning an October 2025 real-estate transaction. The plaintiffs alleged that approximately $837,000 that had been transferred to RSG Law for payment and discharge of a CIBC mortgage was not paid to the bank.

The action alleged fraud and fraudulent misrepresentation, breach of trust, breach of fiduciary duty, breach of contract, conversion and other causes of action. On June 22, 2026, the Ontario Superior Court granted a Mareva injunction freezing up to approximately $870,000 in assets belonging to RSG Law and Khattra and ordered several financial institutions to provide information to assist in tracing the disputed funds. The underlying allegations had not been determined at trial.

Oakville mortgage litigation

Grewal, his father, RSG Law, lawyer Rajkiran Sidhu and Sidhu’s professional corporation were also named as defendants in litigation concerning a property in Oakville. The plaintiff alleged that a mortgage of approximately $1.6 million that had been provided to finance the Grewals’ purchase of the property was subsequently removed from title without authorization or repayment.

The claim alleged that RSG Law had represented the Grewals in connection with the transaction and that Sidhu, who was alleged to have represented the lender, participated in removing the lender’s registered security. The defendants were accused of fraud and other misconduct. The allegations had not been proven in court.

RSG Mayfield loan litigation

On May 8, 2026, Vector Financial Services Limited and Olympia Trust Company commenced an action against Grewal and RSG Mayfield, a company of which Grewal was reported to be the sole director. The plaintiffs alleged that they had advanced approximately $25 million in 2025 for the acquisition of a nearly 20-acre Brampton property intended for residential development and that a required interest payment was not made in April 2026.

The plaintiffs sought approximately $25.6 million, together with contractual interest and other expenses, from RSG Mayfield and Grewal in his capacity as guarantor. The claim remained unresolved when initially reported.

Large-scale lender litigation

On June 26, 2026, members of the Cesana family and 17 other plaintiffs filed an action on the Ontario Superior Court’s Commercial List naming Grewal, RSG Law, Khattra and numerous individuals and corporations among 53 defendants.

The plaintiffs alleged that they had provided more than $107 million in mortgage financing secured against approximately 40 properties and that Grewal, Khattra and RSG Law had arranged or administered many of the transactions. The statement of claim alleged that mortgage charges securing some of the loans were later discharged without authorization and that some properties were subsequently pledged as security to other lenders.

According to the claim, approximately $43 million had been repaid, while approximately $64.15 million remained outstanding. The plaintiffs sought approximately $137 million in relief and requested the appointment of a receiver over properties and other assets securing the debts. They also sought enforcement of share pledges, guarantees and other security. Grewal was the first named defendant.

The plaintiffs referred collectively to Grewal, Khattra and RSG Law as the “RSG Defendants”. The lawsuit alleged fraud, conspiracy and other wrongdoing. At the time the action was initially reported, the allegations had not been tested in court. Grewal’s lawyer said he understood that discussions were taking place toward arrangements for repayment.

Lawsuit against 2 Sikh Gurdwaras and Raj Grewal

In September 2026, was Grewal named as a defendant in a civil lawsuit filed in the Ontario Superior Court of Justice by private lenders SSMT Management Inc. and Oculus Mortgage GP Inc. The lawsuit also named two Sikh religious organizations, Sikh Spiritual Centre Toronto, commonly known as the Etobicoke Gurdwara, and Nanaksar Thath Ishar Darbar in Brampton, as defendants. According to the statement of claim, the two gurdwaras jointly obtained financing that was initially approximately $11 million and was later increased to $15 million, with Grewal acting as a guarantor. The lenders allege that more than $13 million, including outstanding interest, remained owing and that a charge intended to secure the financing against the Brampton gurdwara property was never registered. RSG Law Professional Corporation, the law firm founded by Grewal, represented the borrowers in connection with the transaction. Lawyers representing Grewal and Sikh Spiritual Centre Toronto subsequently stated that they understood the matter had been resolved, while counsel for the lenders said on September 16 that the proceeding remained ongoing. The allegations contained in the lawsuit have not been proven in court.

Other litigation

Toronto law firm Torkin Manes LLP separately sued Grewal and his father in June 2026, alleging that more than $123,000 in legal fees for services provided between January 2025 and February 2026 remained unpaid.

Grewal and the law firm he founded also became involved in litigation concerning the closing of home sales and mortgages not being discharged and Trust fund proceeds being misused.

Grewal also became involved in litigation concerning two Brampton residential properties after defaulting on a short-term loan. In February 2026, the Ontario Superior Court ordered Grewal and his father to pay approximately $1.2 million and deliver possession of the properties to the lender. A garnishment order was subsequently issued.

In May 2026, Grewal filed a $12-million defamation action against The Pointer, a local news organization that had published reports concerning RSG Law and the related court proceedings. The Pointer denied liability and announced that it would seek dismissal of the action under Ontario’s legislation concerning strategic lawsuits against public participation.

By August 2026, media reports described more than a dozen, and subsequently more than two dozen, civil proceedings involving Grewal, RSG Law or associated parties. The claims included disputes over unpaid mortgages, mortgage discharges, trust funds and real-estate financing. A September 2026 report by the National Post similarly described a series of lawsuits against Grewal, RSG Law, Khattra and other lawyers and business associates. None of the recent fraud allegations against Grewal had at that time been proven in court.

Law Society proceedings involving RSG Law lawyers

The Law Society of Ontario began separate regulatory investigations into Grewal and Khattra in connection with many of the transactions involved in the civil proceedings.

On July 10, 2026, the Law Society filed a motion with the Law Society Tribunal seeking an interlocutory suspension or restrictions on Grewal’s licence to practise law. The regulator stated that it was investigating allegations that Grewal may have misappropriated or misapplied trust money, knowingly participated in, facilitated or failed to prevent dishonest, fraudulent, criminal or illegal conduct, misled others, and failed to act with honour and integrity. The Law Society alleged that allowing him to continue practising without restrictions created a significant risk of harm to the public or the administration of justice.

Grewal subsequently agreed not to practise law while the interlocutory proceeding was pending. The Law Society Tribunal published reasons concerning the proceeding on August 26, 2026 as Law Society of Ontario v. Grewal, 2026 ONLSTH 160. The regulatory allegations were separate from findings of liability in the civil lawsuits.

The Law Society also brought an interlocutory suspension proceeding against Khattra, who had taken ownership of RSG Law. On July 22, 2026, the Law Society Tribunal suspended Khattra’s licence pending the regulatory investigation and subsequently published reasons for its decision on August 6.

As of September 2026, the civil litigation and Law Society investigations involving Grewal, RSG Law and associated individuals remained ongoing.

== Electoral record ==
2015 Canadian federal election: Brampton East
Party	Candidate	Votes	%	±%	Expenditures
Liberal	Raj Grewal	23,652	52.32	+21.67	$149,172.33
Conservative	Naval Bajaj	10,642	23.54	-5.94	$189,039.82
New Democratic	Harbaljit Singh Kahlon	10,400	23.01	-14.64	–
Green	Kyle Lacroix	512	1.13	-0.57	$144.64
Total valid votes/expense limit		45,206	100.00		$201,381.89
Total rejected ballots		304	0.67	–	
Turnout		45,510	67.20	–	
Eligible voters		67,721			
Liberal notional gain from New Democratic		Swing		+18.15	
Source: Elections Canada
