= Brampton North—Caledon =

Federal electoral district in Ontario, Canada

Ontario electoral district
- Interactive map of riding boundaries from the 2025 federal election

Federal electoral district
- Legislature: House of Commons
MP
Ruby Sahota
Liberal
- District created: 2023
- First contested: 2025
- Last contested: 2025
- District webpage: profile, map

Demographics
- Population (2021): 106,762
- Electors (2025): 67,656
- Area (km²): 159.6
- Pop. density (per km²): 668.9
- Census division: Peel
- Census subdivision(s): Brampton (part), Caledon (part)

Brampton North—Caledon (French: Brampton-Nord–Caledon) is a federal electoral district in Ontario, Canada.

== Geography ==
Under the 2022 Canadian federal electoral redistribution the riding will largely replace Brampton North. Brampton North—Caledon will gain all parts of the Dufferin—Caledon riding in Caledon south of King Street and west of The Gore Road and all of the Brampton East riding west of Airport Road.

== Demographics ==
According to the 2021 Canadian census

Languages: 52.4% English, 2.9% Urdu, 2.9% Gujarati, 2.4% Hindi, 2.0% Tamil, 1.4% Italian, 1.4% Spanish, 1.2% Portuguese, 1.1% Tagalog, 1.0% French

Religions: 36.7% Christian (18.7% Catholic, 2.3% Pentecostal, 1.7% Anglican, 1.1% United Church, 12.9% Other), 27.6% Sikh, 15.3% Hindu, 10.7% No religion, 8.4% Muslim

Median income: $37,600 (2020)

Average income: $48,160 (2020)

Panethnic groups in Brampton North—Caledon (2021)
| Panethnic group | 2021 | |
| Panethnic group | Pop. | % |
|---|---|---|
| South Asian | 54,520 | 51.47% |
| European (Note: Statistic includes all persons that did not make up part of a visible minority or an indigenous identity.) | 25,230 | 23.82% |
| African | 12,020 | 11.35% |
| Southeast Asian (Note: Statistic includes total responses of "Filipino" and "Southeast Asian" under visible minority section on census.) | 3,655 | 3.45% |
| Middle Eastern (Note: Statistic includes total responses of "West Asian" and "Arab" under visible minority section on census.) | 1,695 | 1.6% |
| Latin American | 1,595 | 1.51% |
| East Asian (Note: Statistic includes total responses of "Chinese", "Korean", and "Japanese" under visible minority section on census.) | 1,575 | 1.49% |
| Indigenous | 585 | 0.55% |
| Other/multiracial (Note: Statistic includes total responses of "Visible minority, n.i.e." and "Multiple visible minorities" under visible minority section on census.) | 5,060 | 4.78% |
| Total responses | 105,935 | 99.23% |
| Total population | 106,760 | 100% |
Notes: Totals greater than 100% due to multiple origin responses. Demographics based on 2022 Canadian federal electoral redistribution riding boundaries.

== History ==
| Parliament | Years | Member | Party |
|---|---|---|---|
Brampton North—Caledon; Riding created from Brampton East, Brampton North and Dufferin—Caledon
| 45th | 2025–present | Ruby Sahota | Liberal |

== Electoral Results ==
2025 Canadian federal election
| Party | Candidate | Votes | % | ±% | Expenditures |
|---|---|---|---|---|---|
| Liberal | Ruby Sahota | 22,847 | 49 | –2.51 | |
| Conservative | Amandeep Judge | 22,105 | 47.4 | +14.34 | |
| New Democratic | Ruby Zaman | 1,008 | 2.16 | –11.79 | |
| People's | Sat Anand | 635 | 1.37 | +0.41 | |
| Total valid votes/expense limit | | 46,595 | | | |
| Total rejected ballots | | 449 | | | |
| Turnout | | 47,044 | 68.05 | | |
| Eligible voters | | 69,132 | | | |
| Liberal hold | | Swing | | –8.43 | |
Source: Elections Canada

2021 federal election redistributed results
| Party | Vote | % |
|---|---|---|
| Liberal | 18,815 | 51.44 |
| Conservative | 12,140 | 33.19 |
| New Democratic | 5,102 | 13.95 |
| People's | 350 | 0.96 |
| Green | 148 | 0.40 |
| Others | 19 | 0.05 |

== See also ==
- List of Canadian electoral districts
