= Sheree Bradford-Lea =

Canadian cartoonist

- Born: Hamilton, Ontario, Canada
- Occupations: Cartoonist and mixed media artist

Sheree Bradford-Lea is a Canadian freelance cartoonist and mixed-media artist based in Ottawa, Ontario.

== Career ==
Bradford-Lea received a M.A. in psychology from Wilfrid Laurier University.

Her cartoons and humour have been published in various publications since 1994, starting with The Best Contemporary Women's Humor. Her cartoon strip 'Life Outside the Box' was a regular feature in the quarterly publication Homebase: A Forum for Mothers from 1998 until Homebase ceased publication in 2003, and in the monthly publication Cahoots magazine from 2005 until Cahoots ceased publication in 2011; she also wrote humour pieces for both. She was the editorial cartoonist at the weekly newspaper The Winchester Press and at the weekly online news publication Blacklock's Reporter. Her freelance cartoons have been printed and reprinted in various publications, including Horizon Magazine: A Digest of Good Stories and Humour, Herizons, Hip Mama and The New Quarterly. As Randy Glasbergen said: "Having an editor accept one of your cartoons is comparable to having an audience laugh at a joke told by a comedian. Getting that cartoon reprinted in another publication is like a standing ovation."

Bradford-Lea artworks have been part of group exhibitions in Ottawa galleries since 2008. She has also created and donated artworks to raise money for Habitat for Humanity, The Canadian Stone Carving Festival (2010–present), and the Dr. Who chair for the Ikea & OCRI Pull Up a Chair for Breakfast Campaign, with her children, Remy and Monica. Her work is also sold through her own company, SABL Cartoon Creations. A play, The Devil Is in the Details, was produced by Flush Ink Productions in 2013, and a stand-alone monologue I Am Supergirl was produced by Sarasvàti Theatre in the same year. I Am Supergirl proved to be a popular piece; additional performances were requested by the United Nations Platform Action Committee and the Legal Education and Access Fund for women.

In 2015, Bradford-Lea co-created Shanima Puppet Players, and the group received a 2016 art grant to perform at The Happening in Hintonburg. Sheree Bradford-Lea still performs with her sheep puppet, Daphne, at various events.

In addition to creating cartoons and multimedia art, Bradford-Lea teaches classes and workshops on cartooning, other visual art and drama in various locations in Ottawa, was the Creative Cartooning and Illustration Professor at Algonquin College from 2009 to 2013, gives talks and writes articles on cartooning.

== Publications ==
- Caricature-Canadian Editorial Cartoons (Linda Leith Publishing) (Cartoon)
- Mothering Canada: Interdisciplinary Voices (Demeter Press) (Cartoons)
- The Best Contemporary Women's Humor (Crossing Press) (Humour pieces)
- Herstory: The Canadian Women's Calendar, 2004 to 2012 (Coteau Books) (Cartoons)
- I Am Supergirl, stand alone monologue produced by Sarasvàti Productions
- Helping The Medicine Go Down During Reading Tasks Canadian Teacher Magazine (April 2014 issue)
