= Amandeep Sodhi =

Canadian politician

Amandeep Sodhi MP
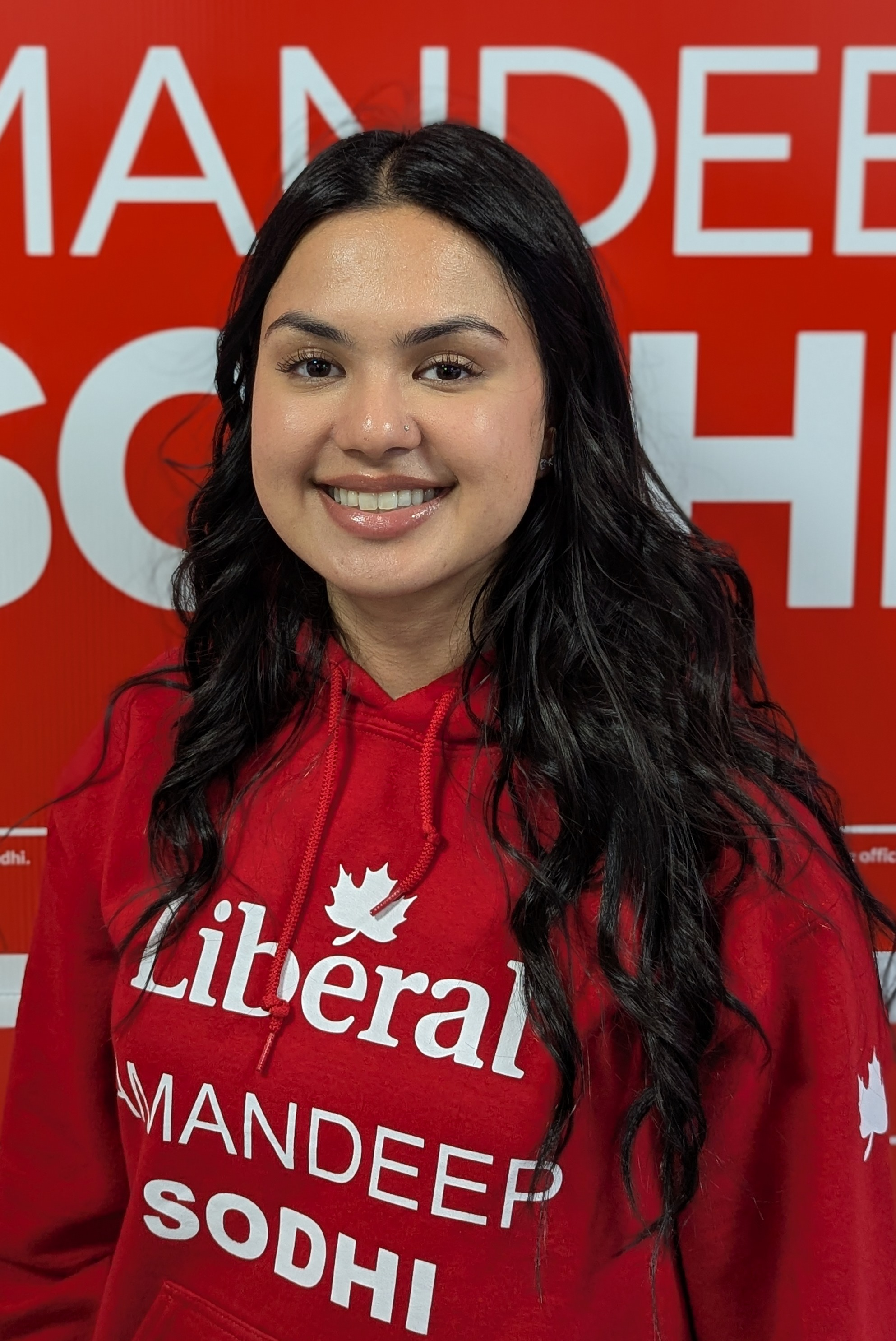
- Sodhi in her campaign office in 2025

Member of Parliament for Brampton Centre
- Incumbent
- Assumed office April 28, 2025
- Preceded by: Shafqat Ali

Personal details
- Born: 2001 (age 24–25) Toronto, Ontario, Canada
- Party: Liberal
- Website: amandeepsodhi.libparl.ca

Amandeep Sodhi (born 2001) is a Canadian politician who was elected member of Parliament for the riding of Brampton Centre in the 2025 Canadian federal election as a member of the Liberal Party.

== Early life ==
Sodhi was born in 2001 in Toronto, Ontario. In 2023, she graduated with a bachelor's degree in political science from King’s University College at the University of Western Ontario. Prior to entering politics, she worked as a legal assistant. At the time of the 2025 Canadian federal election, she lived in Brampton.

== Political career ==
In January 2025, Sodhi was acclaimed the Liberal candidate for the riding of Brampton Centre. She was elected later that year in the 2025 federal election. Alongside Fares Al Soud, Tatiana Auguste, and Jake Sawatzky, Sodhi is one of the first four Canadian members of Parliament born in the 21st century.

In November 2025, Sodhi sponsored a petition calling for federal funding and permanent residency for foreign students and migrant workers at risk of deportation, according to Blacklock’s Reporter.

== Electoral record ==
2025 Canadian federal election: Brampton Centre
Party	Candidate	Votes	%	±%	Expenditures
Liberal	Amandeep Sodhi	19,716	48.37	+0.05	
Conservative	Taran Chahal	19,105	46.87	+15.45	
New Democratic	Anil Boodhai	1,085	2.66	−13.12	
Green	Ray Shaver	469	1.15	N/A	
People's	Harsimran Kaur Hundal	288	0.71	−2.89	
Centrist	Taha Nazir	97	0.24	N/A	
Total valid votes/expense limit		40,760	99.18	+0.6	
Total rejected ballots		338	0.82	-0.6	
Turnout		41,098	62.08	+8.03	
Eligible voters		66,201			
Liberal hold		Swing		−7.70	
Source: Elections Canada
Note: number of eligible voters does not include voting day registrations.
