= Ruby Sahota =

Canadian politician (born 1979)

The Honourable Ruby Sahota PC MP
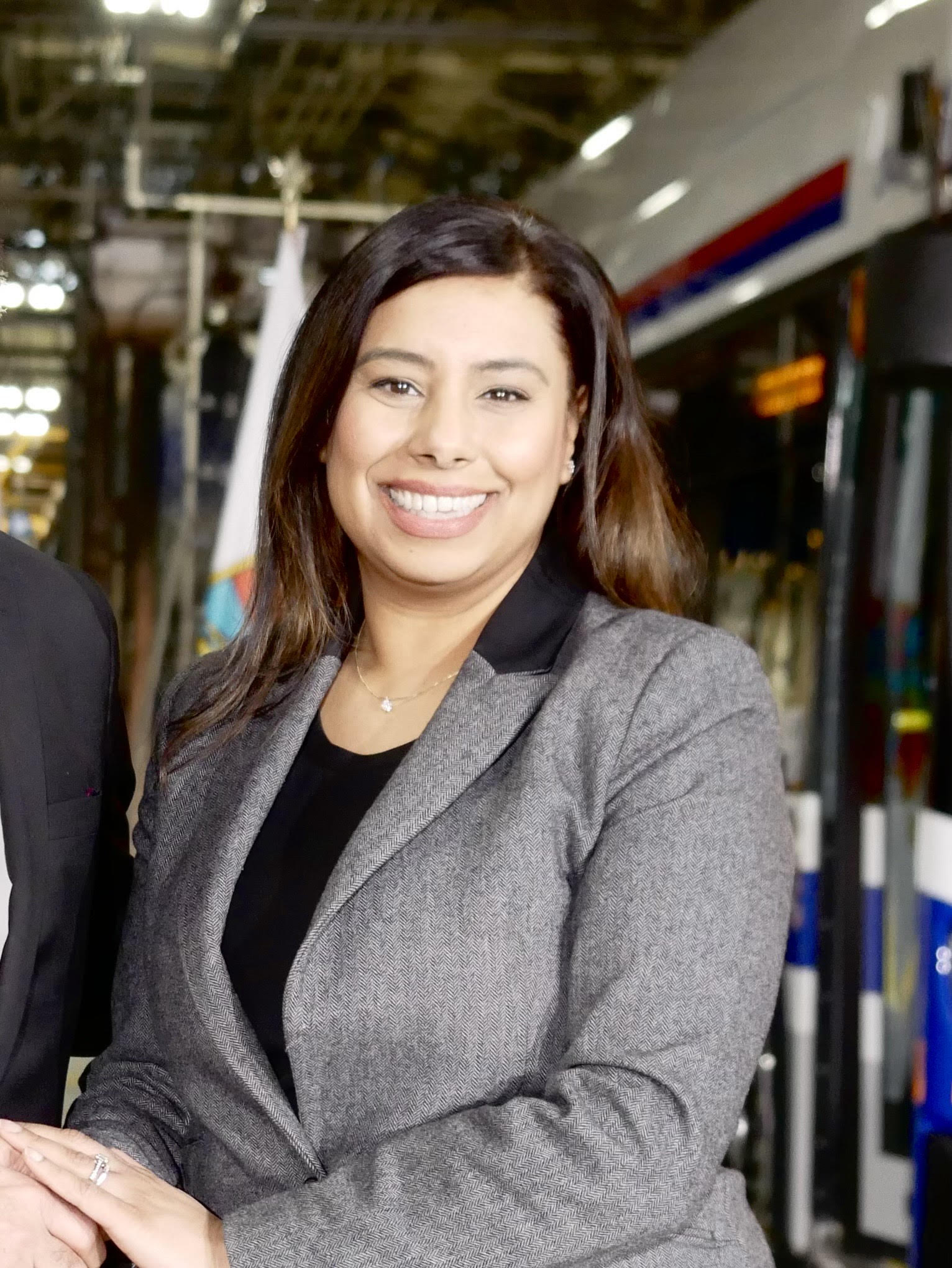
- Sahota in 2025

Secretary of State (Combatting Crime)
- Incumbent
- Assumed office May 13, 2025
- Prime Minister: Mark Carney
- Preceded by: Position established

Minister of Democratic Institutions
- In office December 20, 2024 – March 14, 2025
- Prime Minister: Justin Trudeau
- Preceded by: Dominic LeBlanc
- Succeeded by: Arielle Kayabaga

Minister responsible for the Federal Economic Development Agency for Southern Ontario
- In office December 20, 2024 – March 14, 2025
- Prime Minister: Justin Trudeau
- Preceded by: Filomena Tassi
- Succeeded by: Evan Solomon

Chief Government Whip
- In office January 8, 2024 – December 20, 2024; Interim: January 8, 2024 – July 9, 2024
- Prime Minister: Justin Trudeau
- Preceded by: Steven MacKinnon
- Succeeded by: Mona Fortier

Member of Parliament for Brampton North—Caledon Brampton North (2015–2025)
- Incumbent
- Assumed office October 19, 2015
- Preceded by: Riding established

Personal details
- Born: Ruby Singh Sahota; June 22, 1979 (age 47) Toronto, Ontario, Canada
- Party: Liberal
- Spouse: Tejinder Sahota
- Children: 1
- Education: McMaster University (BA); Cooley Law School (JD)
- Website: Official website

Ruby Singh Sahota (born June 22, 1979) is a Canadian lawyer and politician who has been Secretary of State (Combatting Crime) since 2025. A member of the Liberal Party, Sahota has been a member of Parliament (MP) since 2015, representing Brampton North and its successor riding Brampton North—Caledon. She was Chief Government Whip in 2024 and Minister of Democratic Institutions from 2024 to 2025.

== Early life and education ==
Sahota was born in Toronto after her parents arrived in Canada from Punjab, India in the late 1970s, and was raised in Brampton. Her father previously was the Chairman of the Ontario Sikhs and Gurdwara Council.

Sahota attended Brampton's Central Peel Secondary School from 1993 to 1998, and then graduated with an Honours bachelor's degree in Political Science and Peace Studies at McMaster University in 2003. She then attended Cooley Law School, graduating in 2007.

== Legal career ==
From 2007 to 2012, Sahota practiced law in Cleveland, Ohio, focusing on commercial litigation.

== Political career ==
Sahota sought the Liberal nomination for the newly created riding of Brampton North, winning it on March 1, 2015.

The general election campaign involved some controversy, as Sahota's campaign criticized leaflets circulated by her opponent, Conservative incumbent Parm Gill, which it was alleged were deliberately aimed at confusing Sahota with previous Liberal Party MP Ruby Dhalla. Sahota defeated Gill to win the election.

Once elected, Sahota was appointed to both the Standing Committee on the Status of Women and the Standing Committee on Procedure and House Affairs. She was subsequently named to the Special Committee on Electoral Reform. On February 1, 2017, she was elected Chair of the Federal Liberal Ontario Caucus by her peers. As Caucus Chair, she presides over meetings, leads discussions, and is an important link between Ontario Liberal MPs and the Prime Minister's Office and Cabinet.

Sahota was appointed interim Chief Government Whip on January 8, 2024, replacing Steven MacKinnon while he was appointed interim Government House Leader while Karina Gould was on maternity leave. MacKinnon was promoted to Minister of Labour on July 9, 2024 making Sahota's appointment as whip permanent.

Sahota became Minister of Democratic Institutions and Minister responsible for the Federal Economic Development Agency for Southern Ontario in December 2024. She was appointed by Prime Minister Mark Carney to be part of the 30th Canadian Ministry as Secretary of State (Combatting Crime).

== Personal life ==
She is married to podiatrist Dr. Tejinder Sahota and has a son named Nihal.

== Electoral record ==
2025 Canadian federal election: Brampton North—Caledon
| Party | Candidate | Votes | % | ±% | Expenditures |
|---|---|---|---|---|---|
| Liberal | Ruby Sahota | 22,847 | 49 | –2.51 | |
| Conservative | Amandeep Judge | 22,105 | 47.4 | +14.34 | |
| New Democratic | Ruby Zaman | 1,008 | 2.16 | –11.79 | |
| People's | Sat Anand | 635 | 1.37 | +0.41 | |
| Total valid votes/expense limit | | 46,595 | | | |
| Total rejected ballots | | 449 | | | |
| Turnout | | 47,044 | 68.05 | | |
| Eligible voters | | 69,132 | | | |
| Liberal hold | | Swing | | –8.43 | |
Source: Elections Canada

2021 Canadian federal election
| Party | Candidate | Votes | % | ±% |
|---|---|---|---|---|
| Liberal | Ruby Sahota | 22,976 | 53.87 | +2.44 |
| Conservative | Medha Joshi | 13,292 | 31.16 | +3.49 |
| New Democratic | Teresa Yeh | 6,386 | 14.97 | -1.92 |
| Total valid votes | | 42,654 | | |
| Total rejected ballots | | | | |
| Turnout | | 42,654 | 56.61 | -8.58 |
| Eligible voters | | 75,344 | | |
Source: Elections Canada
| Liberal hold | | Swing | | -0.53 |

2019 Canadian federal election: Brampton North
| Party | Candidate | Votes | % | ±% | Expenditures |
|---|---|---|---|---|---|
| Liberal | Ruby Sahota | 25,970 | 51.42 | +3.05 | $76,162.12 |
| Conservative | Arpan Khanna | 13,973 | 27.67 | -5.32 | $100,060.30 |
| New Democratic | Melissa Edwards | 8,382 | 16.90 | +0.40 | $17,829.85 |
| Green | Norbert D'Costa | 1,516 | 3.00 | +1.10 | $0.00 |
| People's | Keith Frazer | 510 | 1.01 | – | none listed |
| Total valid votes/expense limit | | 50,502 | 99.03 | | |
| Total rejected ballots | | 496 | 0.97 | | |
| Turnout | | 50,998 | 65.19 | | |
| Eligible voters | | 78,229 | | | |
| Liberal hold | | Swing | | +4.11 | |
Source: Elections Canada

2015 Canadian federal election: Brampton North
| Party | Candidate | Votes | % | ±% | Expenditures |
|---|---|---|---|---|---|
| Liberal | Ruby Sahota | 23,297 | 48.37 | +20.21 | $136,386.70 |
| Conservative | Parm Gill | 15,888 | 32.99 | -15.88 | $194,312.26 |
| New Democratic | Martin Singh | 7,946 | 16.50 | -2.34 | $78,854.84 |
| Green | Pauline Thornham | 915 | 1.90 | -1.78 | $146.44 |
| Communist | Harinderpal Hundal | 120 | 0.25 | – | – |
| Total valid votes/expense limit | | 48,166 | 100.00 | | $206,076.29 |
| Total rejected ballots | | 318 | 0.66 | – | |
| Turnout | | 48,484 | 66.13 | – | |
| Eligible voters | | 73,321 | | | |
| Liberal notional gain from Conservative | | Swing | | +18.05 | |
Source: Elections Canada

Order of precedence
| Preceded by Evan Solomon as Member of the Cabinet | Order of Precedence of Canada as Secretary of State | Succeeded by Buckley Belanger as Secretary of State |
