= Ramesh Sangha =

Canadian politician (born 1945)

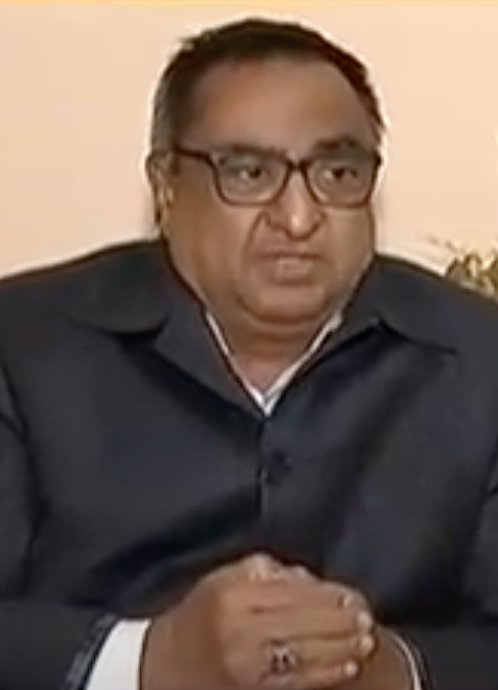

Member of Parliament for Brampton Centre
- In office October 19, 2015 – September 20, 2021
- Preceded by: Riding established
- Succeeded by: Shafqat Ali

Personal details
- Born: June 6, 1945 (age 80) India
- Party: Independent (since 2021)
- Other political affiliations: Liberal (2015–2021)

Rameshwer Singh Sangha (born June 6, 1945) is a Canadian lawyer and former politician who served as Member of Parliament (MP) for the riding of Brampton Centre from 2015 to 2021. He was first elected in the 2015 federal election and was re-elected in 2019.

On January 25, 2021, Sangha was removed from the Liberal caucus based on accusations he made that multiple other Liberal MPs supported the Khalistan movement — allegations the Liberal Party deemed "baseless". He then sat as an independent in the House of Commons. Sangha voiced these allegations publicly in a 2019 interview with the Punjabi-language channel 5AAB. Mark Holland, the Government Chief Whip, issued a statement reading: "As we have made clear time and time again, we will not tolerate conspiracy theories, or dangerous and unfounded rhetoric about Parliamentarians or other Canadians. Unfortunately, it is not uncommon for many Canadians to experience suspicions because of their background; we all know where this can lead." He did not seek re-election in the 2021 federal election.

== Electoral history ==
2019 Canadian federal election: Brampton Centre
Party	Candidate	Votes	%	±%	Expenditures
Liberal	Ramesh Sangha	18,771	47.21	-1.43	$84,508.26
Conservative	Pawanjit Gosal	10,696	26.90	-6.77	$102,185.61
New Democratic	Jordan Boswell	7,819	19.67	+4.45	$47,671.91
Green	Pauline Thornham	1,685	4.24	+2.11	$1,108.69
People's	Baljit Bawa	681	1.71		$40,458.58
Marxist–Leninist	David Gershuny	106	0.27		$0.00
Total valid votes/expense limit		39,758	98.81		
Total rejected ballots		480	1.19		
Turnout		40,238	59.27		
Eligible voters		67,890			
Liberal hold		Swing		+2.67	
Source: Elections Canada

2015 Canadian federal election: Brampton Centre
Party	Candidate	Votes	%	±%	Expenditures
Liberal	Ramesh Sangha	19,277	48.64	+23.29	$120,004.74
Conservative	Bal Gosal	13,345	33.67	-12.73	$183,194.43
New Democratic	Rosemary Keenan	5,993	15.12	-8.08	$33,702.51
Green	Saul Marquard T. Bottcher	844	2.13	-2.32	$144.64
Marxist–Leninist	Frank Chilelli	173	0.44	–	–
Total valid votes/expense limit		39,632	100.00		$199,305.79
Total rejected ballots		264	0.66	–	
Turnout		39,896	61.72	–	
Eligible voters		64,640			
Liberal notional gain from Conservative		Swing		+18.01	
Source: Elections Canada
