= Maninder Sidhu =

Canadian politician

The Honourable Maninder Sidhu PC MP
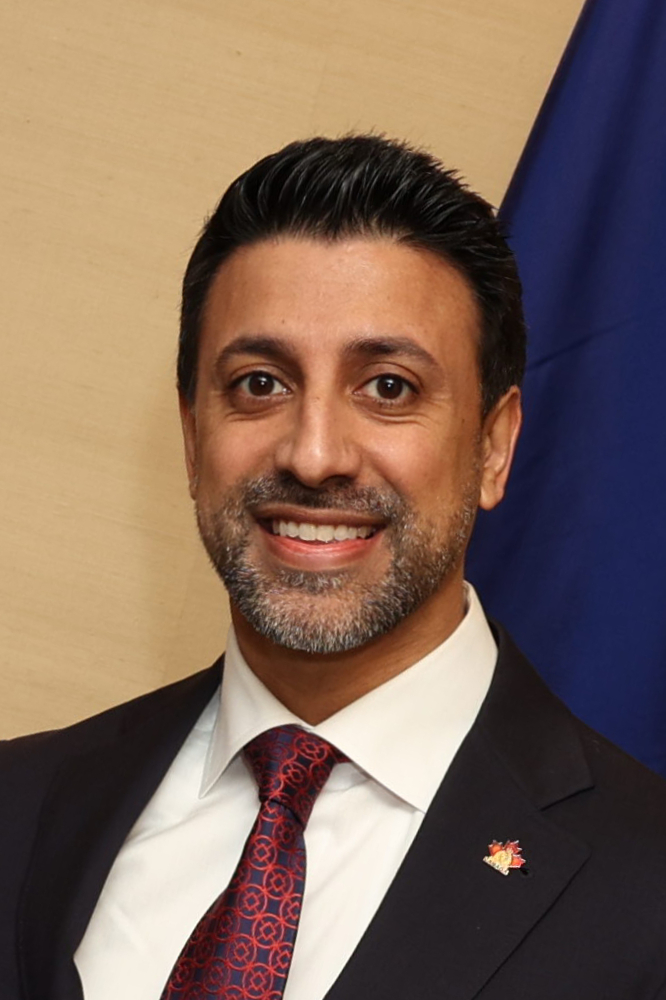
- Sidhu in 2026

Minister of International Trade
- Incumbent
- Assumed office May 13, 2025
- Prime Minister: Mark Carney
- Preceded by: Dominic LeBlanc

Member of Parliament
- Incumbent
- Assumed office October 21, 2019
- Preceded by: Raj Grewal
- Constituency: Brampton East

Personal details
- Born: April 26, 1984 (age 42) Calgary, Alberta, Canada
- Party: Liberal
- Spouse: Joti Sidhu
- Children: 3
- Education: University of Waterloo (BA)
- Profession: Entrepreneur (customs brokerage business) and International trade consultant

Maninder Sidhu PC MP (born April 1984) is a Canadian politician who was first elected to represent the riding of Brampton East in the House of Commons of Canada in the 2019 Canadian federal election.

== Life and career ==
Sidhu has served as a member of the Standing Committee on Natural Resources and the Standing Committee on Transport, Infrastructure and Communities. He is also an active member of several parliamentary associations and interparliamentary groups, including the Canada-Africa Parliamentary Association, the Canada-Europe Parliamentary Association, and the Canadian Section of ParlAmericas.

On March 19, 2021, Sidhu became Parliamentary Secretary to the Minister of International Development. He was re-elected in the 2021 and 2025 federal elections. Following the 2025 election, Sidhu was appointed Minister of International Trade by Prime Minister Mark Carney.

Sidhu lives with his wife and children in Brampton, where he has resided for the past 30 years.

== Electoral record ==
2025 Canadian federal election: Brampton East
Party	Candidate	Votes	%	±%	Expenditures
Liberal	Maninder Sidhu	23,616	48.59	–4.60	
Conservative	Bob Dosanjh Singh	21,731	44.71	+16.15	
People's	Jeff Lal	2,305	4.74	+2.11	
New Democratic	Haramrit Singh	821	1.69	–13.93	
Centrist	Abdus S Kissana	132	0.27	N/A	
Total valid votes/expense limit		48,605	98.78		
Total rejected ballots		598	1.22		
Turnout		49,203	66.74		
Eligible voters		73,721			
Liberal hold		Swing		–10.38	
Source: Elections Canada

2021 Canadian federal election: Brampton East
Party	Candidate	Votes	%	±%	Expenditures
Liberal	Maninder Sidhu	22,120	53.5	+6.1	$97,152.25
Conservative	Naval Bajaj	11,647	28.2	+4.3	$107,663.35
New Democratic	Gail Bannister-Clarke	6,511	15.7	-10.6	$55,251.17
People's	Manjeet Singh	1,073	2.6	+2.1	$4,670.78
Total valid votes/expense limit		41,351	–	–	$109,233.57
Total rejected ballots		436			
Turnout		40,787	54.6		
Eligible voters		76,588			
Liberal hold		Swing			
Source: Elections Canada

2019 Canadian federal election: Brampton East
Party	Candidate	Votes	%	±%	Expenditures
Liberal	Maninder Sidhu	24,050	47.4	-4.92	$92,279.91
New Democratic	Saranjit Singh	13,368	26.3	+3.29	$94,035.50
Conservative	Ramona Singh	12,125	23.9	+0.36	none listed
Green	Teresa Burgess-Ogilvie	666	1.3	+0.17	$885.60
People's	Gaurav Walia	244	0.5		$42.92
Independent	Manpreet Othi	211	0.4		$9,387.07
Canada's Fourth Front	Partap Dua	89	0.2		none listed
Total valid votes/expense limit		50,753	100.0		
Total rejected ballots		510			
Turnout		51,263	66.4		
Eligible voters		77,195			
Liberal hold		Swing		-4.11	
Source: Elections Canada

Order of precedence
Preceded by Gregor Robertson as Member of the Cabinet	Order of Precedence of Canada as Member of the Cabinet	Succeeded by Evan Solomon as Member of the Cabinet
