= Harry Chadwick (politician) =

Canadian politician (1927–2020)

Member of Parliament for Brampton—Malton
- Preceded by: riding created
- Succeeded by: Gurbax Malhi

Personal details
- Born: 13 November 1927
- Died: 23 March 2020 (aged 92)
- Party: Progressive Conservative party
- Spouse: Shirley Chadwick
- Profession: automobile industry

Harry Posting Chadwick (13 November 1927 – 23 March 2020) was a member of the House of Commons of Canada from 1988 to 1993. His background was in the automobile industry, was a receiver and also worked in a warehouse.

Chadwick was a city alderman in Brampton for 10 years. He was elected to federal office in the 1988 federal election at the Brampton—Malton electoral district for the Progressive Conservative party. He served in the 34th Canadian Parliament but lost to Gurbax Malhi of the Liberal Party in the 1993 federal election. In 1990, the riding name changed from Brampton—Malton to Bramalea-Gore-Malton via a Private Members Bill tabled by Mr. Chadwick (see Statutes of Canada, 1990, Ch. 23).

Chadwick died from a years long battle with cancer on 23 March 2020.
