= Kyon? Kis Liye? =

2003 film

Kyon? Kis Liye? (Why? And for whom?) is a Bollywood-inspired Hindi-language film that was shot on a low budget in Hamilton, Ontario, Canada in 2003. The film stars Ruby Dhalla, who was elected to the House of Commons of Canada the year after its completion. Dhalla has sought to block the film's DVD release, arguing that her image was "doctored" in its promotional material.

The film was created by Sihra Productions, which was principally operated by Nand Sihra with his sons Gee and Chico. This was their second film, after and Indian production called Tera Mera Pyar (My And Your Love). The plot of Kyon? Kis Liye? was loosely based on the real-life murder trial of Hamilton resident Sukhwinder Dhillon, with the Sihra brothers playing lead roles. In Bollywood style, the film featured several musical production numbers shot in and around Hamilton. It was screened in Toronto and Hamilton before being released to theatres in India.

Ruby Dhalla appeared in the film as a police officer, and was featured prominently on the film's promotional poster. She explained at the time of the film's release that her image had been digitally altered. "They've contoured my body a bit," she said. "In India, thin is not as in."

In late 2003, federal Heritage Minister Sheila Copps and Indian High Commissioner Shashi Tripathi signed a letter of intent to create a formal relationship between Bollywood and Canada's South Asian film industry. The ceremony took place at the Sihra family's converted auto shop, and the local media noted that the arrangement would benefit companies such as Sinha productions.

Dhalla attempted to block the DVD release of Kyon? Kis Liye? in 2009, arguing that publicity photos and posters from the movie had been "doctored" by putting her face on someone else's body. She also said that the film's release was intended to exploit her status as an elected official. Chico Sihra has said that the images were not doctored, and that Dhalla signed a distribution waiver at the time of the film's production. He adds the form was later destroyed in a fire; Dhalla has denied signing a waiver.
