= Ratainda =

- Village
- Location in Punjab, India
- Coordinates: 31.0916583°N 75.934244°E
- Country: India
- State: Punjab
- District: Shaheed Bhagat Singh Nagar
- Elevation: 246 m (807 ft)

Population (2011)
  - Total: 2,780
- Sex ratio 1385/1395 ♂/♀

Languages
  - Official: Punjabi
  - Other spoken: Hindi
- Time zone: UTC+5:30 (IST)
- PIN: 144029
- Telephone code: 01823
- ISO 3166 code: IN-PB
- Post office: Moron

Ratainda or Ratenda is a large village in Shaheed Bhagat Singh Nagar district of Punjab State, India. The village is administrated by a Sarpanch, who is the elected representative of the village. It is located 2.5 km (1.6 mi) from postal head office Moron, 6.3 km (3.9 mi) from census town Apra, 11.7 km (7.3 mi) from Shaheed Bhagat Singh Nagar and 113 km (70 mi) from Chandigarh.

== Caste ==
The village has a mixed population which includes, but is not limited to, Backward Class (BC), Scheduled Caste (SC) and Farmer. The village doesn't have any Scheduled Tribe (ST) population.

== Education ==
The village has a Punjabi medium, co-educational upper primary with secondary/higher secondary (GSSS Ratainda School) which was established in 1966. The school has a playground, library and also provides mid-day meal as per Indian Midday Meal Scheme, and the meal is prepared on school premises.

== Religious places ==
There are three gurudwaras in the village and a Hindu temple.

== Transport ==
=== Rail ===
Phillaur Junction is the nearest train station, and is situated 19.2 km (11.9 mi) away; however, Goraya Railway Station is 19.7 km (12.2 mi) awaty, and Banga railway station is 23.3 km (14.5 mi) from the village.

=== Air ===
The nearest domestic airport is at Ludhiana, which is 50 km (31 mi) from Ratainda. The nearest international airport is located in Chandigarh, and Sri Guru Ram Dass Jee International Airport is 144 km (89 mi) away in Amritsar.

== Notable people ==
- Baljit Singh Gosal a Canadian politician, who was elected to the House of Commons of Canada in the 2011 election, was born in Ratainda.
