= Brampton North (federal electoral district) =

Former federal electoral district in Ontario, Canada

Coordinates: 43.74°N 79.77°W

Ontario electoral district
- Brampton North in relation to other Greater Toronto Area districts

Federal electoral district
- Legislature: House of Commons
- District created: 2013
- District abolished: 2023
- First contested: 2015
- Last contested: 2021
- District webpage: profile, map

Demographics
- Population (2016): 118,180
- Electors (2015): 72,312
- Area (km²): 33.11
- Census division: Peel
- Census subdivision: Brampton

Brampton North (French: Brampton-Nord) was a federal electoral district in Ontario, Canada. It encompassed portions of Ontario formerly included in the electoral districts of Brampton—Springdale, Bramalea—Gore—Malton and Brampton West.

Brampton North was created by the 2012 federal electoral boundaries redistribution and was legally defined in the 2013 representation order. It came into effect upon the call of the 42nd Canadian federal election held in October 2015.

Under the 2022 Canadian federal electoral redistribution the riding was replaced by Brampton North—Caledon.

== Demographics ==
According to the 2021 Canadian census

Languages: 45.8% English, 22.4% Punjabi, 3.0% Urdu, 2.7% Gujarati, 2.4% Hindi, 1.8% Spanish, 1.7% Tamil, 1.4% Tagalog, 1.4% Italian, 1.1% Portuguese

Religions: 38.4% Christian (19.1% Catholic, 2.3% Pentecostal, 1.9% Anglican, 1.2% United Church, 1.0% Christian Orthodox, 12.9% Other), 25.6% Sikh, 14.7% Hindu, 8.8% Muslim, 1.1% Buddhist, 11.0% None

Median income: $36,800 (2020)

Average income: $46,080 (2020)

Panethnic groups in Brampton North (2011−2021)
Panethnic group	2021		2016		2011	
Panethnic group	Pop.	%	Pop.	%	Pop.	%
South Asian	61,210	49.29%	48,935	41.48%	41,215	37.11%
European (Note: Statistic includes all persons that did not make up part of a visible minority or an indigenous identity.)	29,030	23.37%	36,685	31.1%	42,130	37.93%
African	15,580	12.54%	14,650	12.42%	11,820	10.64%
Southeast Asian (Note: Statistic includes total responses of "Filipino" and "Southeast Asian" under visible minority section on census.)	5,120	4.12%	4,605	3.9%	4,195	3.78%
Latin American	2,490	2%	3,075	2.61%	2,425	2.18%
Middle Eastern (Note: Statistic includes total responses of "West Asian" and "Arab" under visible minority section on census.)	1,840	1.48%	1,585	1.34%	1,375	1.24%
East Asian (Note: Statistic includes total responses of "Chinese", "Korean", and "Japanese" under visible minority section on census.)	1,630	1.31%	2,235	1.89%	2,315	2.08%
Indigenous	815	0.66%	1,010	0.86%	745	0.67%
Other/multiracial (Note: Statistic includes total responses of "Visible minority, n.i.e." and "Multiple visible minorities" under visible minority section on census.)	6,480	5.22%	5,175	4.39%	4,845	4.36%
Total responses	124,195	99.24%	117,965	99.82%	111,065	99.21%
Total population	125,141	100%	118,180	100%	111,951	100%
Notes: Totals greater than 100% due to multiple origin responses. Demographics based on 2012 Canadian federal electoral redistribution riding boundaries.

== Members of Parliament ==
This riding has elected the following members of Parliament:

Parliament	Years	Member	Party
Brampton North; Riding created from Bramalea—Gore—Malton, Brampton—Springdale, and Brampton West
42nd	2015–2019	Ruby Sahota	Liberal
43rd	2019–2021	Ruby Sahota	Liberal
44th	2021–2025	Ruby Sahota	Liberal
Riding dissolved into Brampton—Chinguacousy Park and Brampton North—Caledon

== Election results ==
Graph of election results in Brampton North (minor parties that never got 2% of the vote or didn't run consistently are omitted)

2021 Canadian federal election: Brampton North
Party	Candidate	Votes	%	±%	Expenditures
Liberal	Ruby Sahota	23,412	54.26	+2.84	$91,166.88
Conservative	Medha Joshi	13,289	30.80	+3.13	$56,386.00
New Democratic	Teresa Yeh	6,448	14.94	-1.96	$0.00
Total valid votes/expense limit		43,149	98.92	-0.11	$119,393.54
Total rejected ballots		471	1.08	+0.11	
Turnout		43,620	57.89	-7.30	
Eligible voters		75,344			
Liberal hold		Swing		-0.15	
Source: Elections Canada

2019 Canadian federal election: Brampton North
Party	Candidate	Votes	%	±%	Expenditures
Liberal	Ruby Sahota	25,970	51.42	+3.05	$76,162.12
Conservative	Arpan Khanna	13,973	27.67	-5.32	$100,060.30
New Democratic	Melissa Edwards	8,382	16.90	+0.40	$17,829.85
Green	Norbert D'Costa	1,516	3.00	+1.10	$0.00
People's	Keith Frazer	510	1.01	–	none listed
Total valid votes/expense limit		50,502	99.03		
Total rejected ballots		496	0.97		
Turnout		50,998	65.19		
Eligible voters		78,229			
Liberal hold		Swing		+4.11	
Source: Elections Canada

2015 Canadian federal election: Brampton North
Party	Candidate	Votes	%	±%	Expenditures
Liberal	Ruby Sahota	23,297	48.37	+20.21	$136,386.70
Conservative	Parm Gill	15,888	32.99	-15.88	$194,312.26
New Democratic	Martin Singh	7,946	16.50	-2.34	$78,854.84
Green	Pauline Thornham	915	1.90	-1.78	$146.44
Communist	Harinderpal Hundal	120	0.25	–	–
Total valid votes/expense limit		48,166	100.00		$206,076.29
Total rejected ballots		318	0.66	–	
Turnout		48,484	66.13	–	
Eligible voters		73,321			
Liberal notional gain from Conservative		Swing		+18.05	
Source: Elections Canada

2011 federal election redistributed results
Party	Vote	%
Conservative	19,454	48.87
Liberal	11,208	28.15
New Democratic	7,498	18.83
Green	1,466	3.68
Others	184	0.46

== See also ==
- List of Canadian electoral districts
- Historical federal electoral districts of Canada
