= Shafqat Ali =

Canadian politician

The Honourable Shafqat Ali PC MP

President of the Treasury Board
- Incumbent
- Assumed office May 13, 2025
- Prime Minister: Mark Carney
- Preceded by: Ginette Petitpas Taylor

Member of Parliament for Brampton—Chinguacousy Park
- Incumbent
- Assumed office April 28, 2025
- Preceded by: riding created

Member of Parliament for Brampton Centre
- In office September 20, 2021 – March 23, 2025
- Preceded by: Ramesh Sangha
- Succeeded by: Amandeep Sodhi

Personal details
- Born: 1965 or 1966 (age 60–61)
- Party: Liberal
- Occupation: Politician

Shafqat Ali is a Canadian politician who has been President of the Treasury Board of Canada since 2025. A member of the Liberal Party, Ali was elected to the House of Commons in 2021. He has served as the member of Parliament (MP) for Brampton—Chinguacousy Park since being elected in the 2025 Canadian federal election.

Prior to being elected, Ali worked in real estate.

== Political career ==
Ali was elected to represent the riding of Brampton Centre in the House of Commons of Canada in the 2021 Canadian federal election. He was re-elected in the 2025 election, this time in the newly formed riding of Brampton—Chinguacousy Park.

On May 9, 2022, Ali apologized to the House of Commons for attending the House of Commons virtually from a toilet stall.

In the 2025 Liberal Party of Canada leadership election, he endorsed Mark Carney. He won the new seat of Brampton—Chinguacousy Park in the 2025 Canadian federal election. On May 13, 2025, Ali was appointed as the president of the Treasury Board.

At the time of the 2025 Canadian federal election, he lived in Mississauga.

== Electoral history ==
2025 Canadian federal election: Brampton—Chinguacousy Park
Party	Candidate	Votes	%	±%	Expenditures
Liberal	Shafqat Ali	21,532	48.8	–1.98	
Conservative	Tim Iqbal	19,591	44.4	+13.46	
New Democratic	Teresa Yeh	1,173	2.7	–14.16	
People's	Jayesh Brahmbhatt	741	1.7	N/A	
Green	Mike Dancy	521	1.2	N/A	
Independent	Avi Dhaliwal	328	0.7	N/A	
Centrist	Hafiz Muneeb Ahmad	194	0.4	N/A	
Total valid votes/expense limit		44,080			
Total rejected ballots		473			
Turnout		44,553	63.69		
Eligible voters		69,958			
Liberal hold		Swing		–7.72	
Source: Elections Canada

2021 Canadian federal election: Brampton Centre
Party	Candidate	Votes	%	±%	Expenditures
Liberal	Shafqat Ali	16,189	47.66	+0.45	$93,043.67
Conservative	Jagdeep Singh	11,038	32.46	+5.56	$36,728.21
New Democratic	Jim McDowell	5,932	17.46	-2.21	$18,285.43
Independent	Ronni Shino	824	2.43	–	none listed
Total valid votes/expense limit		33,971	98.58	-0.23	$104,033.21
Total rejected ballots		488	1.42	+0.23	
Turnout		34,459	54.05	-5.22	
Eligible voters		63,751			
Liberal hold		Swing		-2.56	
Source: Elections Canada

Order of precedence
Preceded by Joanne Thompson as Member of the Cabinet	Order of Precedence of Canada as Member of the Cabinet	Succeeded by Rebecca Alty as Member of the Cabinet
