= Green Party of Ontario candidates in the 2003 Ontario provincial election =

The Green Party of Ontario fielded 102 candidates in the 2003 provincial election in Ontario, Canada, none of whom were elected. The only riding which the party did not contest was Oakville. Zakaria Belghali had been selected as the GPO candidate, but did not collect enough signatures to have his candidacy validated by Elections Ontario.

== Ron Yurick (Algoma—Manitoulin) ==
From Chapleau, where he is a member of the Watershed Management Study Committee. He used to chair a Public Liaison Committee relating to the Adams Mine Landfall Proposal in Timiskaming. Testified before a Select Committee on Ontario in Confederation in 1991. Yurick supports the principle of bilingualism, opposes the British monarchy, and believes that Northern Ontario's concerns are often ignored by the Canadian government and business elite. A member at large on the Green Party of Ontario council. Opposes sending garbage from Toronto to Kirkland Lake. Led the party's constitutional rewriting process in 2004. Received 680 votes (2.4%), finishing last in a field of four candidates. The winner was Mike Brown of the Ontario Liberal Party.

== Ernst Braendli (Bramalea—Gore—Malton—Springdale) ==
A member of the Brampton Environmental Community Advisory Panel. In 2005, accused the city of Brampton of "scrambling for infrastructure" to accommodate high growth. Has also suggested making public transportation free of charge to achieve reduced pollution levels. Received 1,176 votes (2.78%), finishing fourth in a field of six candidates. The winner was Kuldip Kular of the Ontario Liberal Party.

== Brant: Mike Clancy ==
Mike Clancy was born in London, Ontario and raised in St. Thomas. He received a degree in religious studies and ethics from the University of Waterloo in the 1970s. Clancy was an employment counsellor with the federal employment and immigration department and its successor, Human Resources Development Canada (HRDC), from 1980 until quitting in 1997. When he left his job, he said that he could not administer its program under terms that he considered "immoral and unethical." He strongly supported government funding for social programs and health care, and criticized both federal and provincial governments for cutting back these services.

He ran for the governing New Democratic Party of Ontario in the northern division of Kenora in the 1995 provincial election and expressed concern that the Progressive Conservatives would target the poor and unemployed if they won the election. The Progressive Conservatives did win the election and later introduced massive cuts to social assistance; Clancy said the severity of the cuts was unexpected and produced extreme hardship among poorer people in Kenora.

Clancy accused federal parliamentarians Jane Stewart and Robert Nault of using HRDC job-creation funds for dubious political goals during the period of Jean Chrétien's government. Stewart rejected Clancy's claims, describing them as "the simple-minded agenda of a failed provincial NDP candidate."

After leaving HDRC, Clancy moved to Brantford. He considered seeking the New Democratic Party's nomination for the 1999 provincial election, but ultimately did not do so. In 2000, he ran against local Member of Parliament (MP) Jane Stewart as a candidate of the fringe Canadian Action Party. During this period, Clancy was a private advocate for Canadians whose Employment Insurance benefits had been cut off by the federal government; he also accused the government of misusing the private information of many Canadians.

Clancy later became active with the Green Party and ran under its banner in the 2003 provincial election. He also sought election to the Brantford city council in 2003 and ran for a regional council position in Waterloo three years later. In the 2006 election, he supported the legalization of marijuana and prostitution. He also called for more police officers and a greater voice for the rural areas around Waterloo.

Electoral record
| Election | Division | Party | Votes | % | Place | Winner |
|---|---|---|---|---|---|---|
| 1995 provincial | Kenora | New Democratic Party | 2,788 | 16.36 | 3/3 | Frank Miclash, Liberal |
| 2000 federal | Brant | Canadian Action | 447 | 1.05 | 6/6 | Jane Stewart, Liberal |
| 2003 provincial | Brant | Green | 1,014 | 2.28 | 4/5 | Dave Levac, Liberal |
| 2003 municipal | Brantford Council, Ward Five | n/a | 245 | 3.65 | 6/7 | Marguerite Ceschi-Smith and John Starkey |
| 2006 municipal | Waterloo Regional Council, Councillor | n/a | 1,553 | 4.26 | 5/5 | Sean Strickland and Jane Mitchell |

== John R. Fisher (Elgin—Middlesex—London) ==
Retired. A graduate of the University of Western Ontario, and worked as a teacher for 25 years. His main field of expertise was Geography. Was reeve of Rodney, Ontario in the early 1990s, and served on the Elgin County Council. Previously served as a councillor in Rodney for fifteen years. Chaired the Ontario/Quebec chapter of Common Ground-USA in 2002. Has also written on the history of the Georgist movement in Canada. Is himself a Georgist, favouring site-value taxation, and helped make this an official policy of the Green Party. Supports higher taxation on community-owned land to prevent urban sprawl.

== Matt Takach (Nepean—Carleton) ==
Takach (born September 24, 1979) was a criminology student at Carleton University during the 2000 federal election. He began working for the Green Party on a full-time basis after his graduation, and was the GPC's national organizer during the 2004 federal election (for which he was not a candidate). He is still the party's director of organization as of 2005.

During the 2003 election, Takach described the Green Party's policies as fiscally responsible and socially aware" (Ottawa Citizen, September 27, 2003). He has rejected the view that the Green Party is solely focused on environmentalism.

Electoral record
| Election | Division | Party | Votes | % | Place | Winner |
|---|---|---|---|---|---|---|
| 2000 federal | Ottawa West—Nepean | Green | 585 | 1.1 | 5/10 | Marlene Catterall, Liberal |
| 2003 provincial | Nepean—Carleton | Green | 2,200 | 3.76 | 4/4 | John R. Baird, Progressive Conservative |

== John Cowling (Perth—Middlesex) ==
A Green Party supporter since 1988 and a resident of Stratford, he described himself as "conservative and someone dedicated to restoring and maintaining Ontario's ecological heritage." Received 1,201 votes.

== Gregory Elliott Laxton (Trinity—Spadina) ==
Laxton joined the Green Party in 2000, and was a policy spokesman for the party in 2002 in the aftermath of a government report into the tainted-water tragedy in Walkerton, Ontario. He argued that water is a "public good", and "should not be a privately-run entity". "If you want to make sure the water is safe," he argued, "you should have it run by a not-for-profit entity like the government." (Hamilton Spectator, June 18, 2002).

He received 2,362 votes in 2003 (5.82%), finishing fourth against New Democratic Party incumbent Rosario Marchese.

Laxton was 36 years old as of 2005, and served as the GPO's fundraising chair from 2000 to 2003. He holds a Bachelor of Arts degree in International Studies and History from Trent University, and a master's degree in political science at York University.

== Allan Douglas Strong (Waterloo—Wellington) ==
Strong is a mental-health advocate, and is a social worker with the Canadian Mental Health Association (Kitchener-Waterloo Record, September 23, 2003) and serves as president of the Wellness Network in Ontario as of 2005. In 1997, he testified before a committee of the Legislative Assembly of Ontario as a representative of the Mood Disorders Association of Ontario. Strong himself has acknowledged suffering from bipolar disorder.

Electoral record
| Election | Division | Party | Votes | % | Place | Winner |
|---|---|---|---|---|---|---|
| 2000 federal | Waterloo—Wellington | NDP | 1,845 | 4.11 | 4/6 | Lynn Myers, Liberal |
| 2003 provincial | Waterloo—Wellington | Green | 1,203 | | 4/4 | Ted Arnott, Progressive Conservative |
| 2003 municipal | Wilmot Township Council, Ward 3 | Ind. | 50 | 6.17 | 4/4 | Terry Broda |

The 2003 municipal results are unofficial totals, taken from the Kitchener-Waterloo Record, November 12, 2003, B8. The final results were not significantly different. Strong also campaigned for municipal office in 1997, but the results are not available online.

== Cary M. Lucier (Windsor West) ==
Lucier was born and raised in the Windsor community. He graduated from Assumption High School in 1982, and later served with the Canadian Navy. He joined the Windsor Fire Department in 1986. Lucier later became a private businessman, serving as president of the Stak-Its Toy Company and writing children's storybooks.

== By-elections ==
=== Nick Boileau (Whitby—Ajax, March 30, 2006) ===
Boileau was a 22-year-old resident of Whitby at the time of the election, and was a third-year student in Criminology at the University of Ontario Institute of Technology. He is bilingual in French and English, and is described as having a particular interest in human rights and social justice. According to unofficial results, he received 307 votes (0.89%) for a fourth-place finish against Progressive Conservative candidate Christine Elliott.
