= Bramalea—Gore—Malton (federal electoral district) =

Former federal electoral district in Ontario, Canada

Ontario electoral district
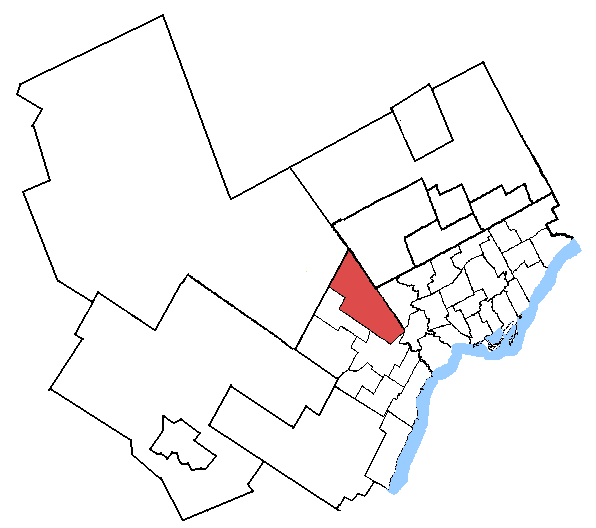
- Bramalea—Gore—Malton in relation to neighbouring electoral districts
- Coordinates: 43°43′24″N 79°41′34″W; Location of the constituency office in Brampton (as of 3 September 2010)

Defunct federal electoral district
- Legislature: House of Commons
- District created: 1987
- District abolished: 2013
- First contested: 1988
- Last contested: 2011
- District webpage: profile, map

Demographics
- Population (2011): 192,020
- Electors (2011): 100,002
- Area (km²): 143.04
- Census division(s): Peel
- Census subdivision(s): Mississauga, Brampton

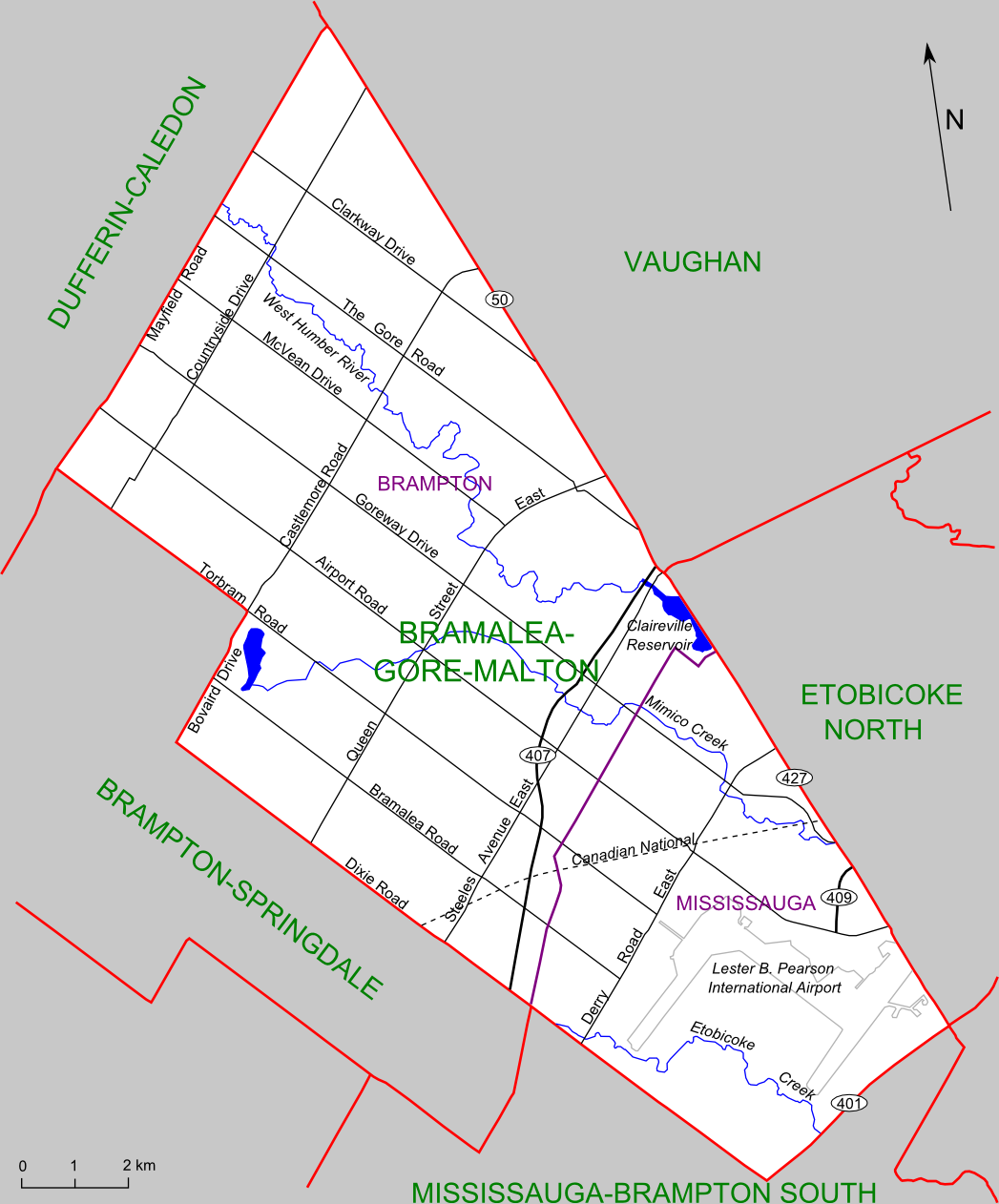
Map of Bramalea-Gore-Malton

Bramalea—Gore—Malton (formerly known as Brampton—Malton and Bramalea—Gore—Malton—Springdale) was a federal electoral district in Ontario, Canada, that was represented in the House of Commons of Canada. In 2015, it was dissolved into the ridings of Brampton East, Mississauga—Malton, Brampton Centre and Brampton North.

The district was created as "Brampton—Malton" in 1987 from Brampton—Georgetown and Mississauga North. The name was changed to "Bramalea—Gore—Malton" in 1990, and to "Bramalea—Gore—Malton—Springdale" in 1998

In 2003, Bramalea—Gore—Malton—Springdale was abolished when it was redistributed between a new "Bramalea—Gore—Malton", Brampton—Springdale and Mississauga—Brampton South ridings.

In 2001, it had a population of 119,886 and an area of 151 km^{2}.

It includes the neighbourhoods of Colerane, Ebenezer, Woodhill, Bramalea and Gorewood Acres in the City of Brampton and the neighbourhoods of Malton, Marvin Heights and Ridgewood in the City of Mississauga.

41.9% of people in Bramalea—Gore—Malton are of East Indian ethnic origin, the highest such percentage in Canada. Slightly more than a quarter of the population (25.1%) are immigrants from Southern Asia, which is also the highest such figure for any riding.

== Member of Parliament ==
This riding has elected the following members of Parliament:

Parliament	Years	Member	Party
Brampton—Malton; Riding created from Brampton—Georgetown and Mississauga North
34th	1988–1993	Harry Chadwick	Progressive Conservative
Bramalea—Gore—Malton
35th	1993–1997	Gurbax Singh Malhi	Liberal
36th	1997–2000	Gurbax Singh Malhi	Liberal
Bramalea—Gore—Malton—Springdale
37th	2000–2004	Gurbax Singh Malhi	Liberal
Bramalea—Gore—Malton
38th	2004–2006	Gurbax Singh Malhi	Liberal
39th	2006–2008	Gurbax Singh Malhi	Liberal
40th	2008–2011	Gurbax Singh Malhi	Liberal
41st	2011–2015	Bal Gosal	Conservative
Riding dissolved into Brampton East, Mississauga—Malton, Brampton Centre and Brampton North

== Federal election results ==
2011 Canadian federal election
Party	Candidate	Votes	%	±%	Expenditures
Conservative	Bal Gosal	19,907	34.44	-2.68	–
New Democratic	Jagmeet Singh Dhaliwal	19,368	33.51	+24.49	–
Liberal	Gurbax Singh Malhi	16,402	29.40	-15.65	–
Green	John Moulton	1,748	3.02	-2.14	–
Marxist–Leninist	Frank Chilelli	371	0.64	+0.02	
Total valid votes		57,796	100.00	–	
Total rejected ballots		454	0.80	+0.18	
Turnout		58,250	54.75	+5.01	–
Eligible voters		106,395	–	–	

2008 Canadian federal election
Party	Candidate	Votes	%	±%	Expenditures
Liberal	Gurbax Singh Malhi	22,272	45.05	-5.7	$85,496
Conservative	Stella Ambler	18,353	37.12	+4.6	$91,704
New Democratic	Jash Puniya	5,945	12.02	-0.8	$21,613
Green	Mark Pajot	2,551	5.16	+1.8	$869
Marxist–Leninist	Frank Chilelli	309	0.62	+0.1	
Total valid votes/Expense limit		49,430	100.00	$97,671	
Total rejected ballots		307	0.62	–	
Turnout		49,737	49.74	–	–

2006 Canadian federal election
Party	Candidate	Votes	%	±%
Liberal	Gurbax Singh Malhi	25,349	50.7	+1.2
Conservative	John Sprovieri	16,310	32.6	+2.0
New Democratic	Cesar Martello	6,400	12.8	-2.1
Green	Ernst Braendli	1,721	3.4	-1.1
Marxist–Leninist	Frank Chilelli	233	0.5	-0.1
Total valid votes		50,013	100.0	

2004 Canadian federal election
Party	Candidate	Votes	%	±%
Liberal	Gurbax Singh Malhi	20,394	49.5	-7.5
Conservative	Raminder Gill	12,594	30.6	-3.9
New Democratic	Fernando Miranda	6,113	15.0	10.0
Green	Sharleen McDowall	1,832	4.5	
Marxist–Leninist	Frank Chilelli	237	0.6	-0.1
Total valid votes		41,170	100.0	

Note: Conservative vote is compared to the total of the Canadian Alliance vote and Progressive Conservative vote in 2000 election.

=== Bramalea—Gore—Malton—Springdale ===
2000 Canadian federal election
Party	Candidate	Votes	%	±%
Liberal	Gurbax Malhi	21,917	57.1	+10.7
Alliance	Gurdish Mangat	7,214	18.8	-2.5
Progressive Conservative	Danny Varaich	6,019	15.7	-10.4
New Democratic	Vishnu Roche	1,864	4.9	-0.7
Independent	Gurinder Malhi	783	2.0	
Communist	Jim R. Bridgewood	350	0.9	
Marxist–Leninist	David Greig	269	0.7	0.0
Total valid votes		38,416	100.0	

Note: Canadian Alliance vote is compared to the Reform vote in 1997 election.

1997 Canadian federal election
Party	Candidate	Votes	%	±%
Liberal	Gurbax Malhi	18,933	46.4	+3.5
Progressive Conservative	Beryl Ford	10,655	26.1	+7.1
Reform	Darlene Florence	8,685	21.3	-8.2
New Democratic	Abdul Majeed	2,281	5.6	+0.5
Marxist–Leninist	Philip Fernandez	279	0.7	+0.5
Total valid votes		40,833	100.0	

1993 Canadian federal election
Party	Candidate	Votes	%	±%
Liberal	Gurbax Malhi	16,530	42.9	+8.5
Reform	Darlene Florence	11,376	29.5	
Progressive Conservative	Harry Chadwick	7,338	19.0	-22.5
New Democratic	Paul Ledgister	1,977	5.1	-17.3
National	Jack Ardis	480	1.2	
Natural Law	Bill Davies	279	0.7	
Independent	John E. Maxwell	261	0.7	
Green	Bill Emms	215	0.6	
Marxist–Leninist	Iqbai Sumbal	89	0.2	-0.1
Total valid votes		38,545	100.0	

=== Brampton—Malton ===
1988 Canadian federal election
Party	Candidate	Votes	%
Progressive Conservative	Harry Chadwick	16,427	41.5
Liberal	Gurjit Grewal	13,612	34.4
New Democratic	Paul Ledgister	8,887	22.5
Libertarian	Karl von Harten	350	0.9
Communist	Jim R. Bridgewood	158	0.4
Independent	Iqbai Sumbal	112	0.3
Total valid votes		39,546	100.0

== See also ==
- List of Canadian electoral districts
- Historical federal electoral districts of Canada
