= Ruby Dhalla =

Canadian politician (born 1974)

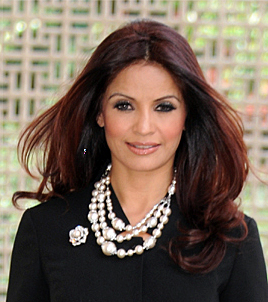
- Dhalla in 2012

Member of Parliament for Brampton—Springdale
- In office October 4, 2004 – March 26, 2011
- Preceded by: Sarkis Assadourian
- Succeeded by: Parm Gill

Personal details
- Born: February 18, 1974 (age 52) Winnipeg, Manitoba, Canada
- Party: Liberal
- Education: University of Winnipeg (BSc); Canadian Memorial Chiropractic College (DC)
- Profession: Chiropractor
- Website: Website

Ruby Dhalla (born February 18, 1974) is a Canadian businesswoman and politician. She served as the Member of Parliament for Brampton—Springdale in the House of Commons of Canada from 2004 to 2011 as a member of the Liberal Party. Dhalla and British Columbia Conservative MP Nina Grewal were the first Sikh women to serve in the House of Commons of Canada.

She was defeated by Conservative Parm Gill in the 2011 federal election. On January 22, 2025, Dhalla announced her candidacy in the 2025 Liberal Party of Canada leadership election. Dhalla was disqualified on February 21, 2025, after being accused of violating the Canada Elections Act, as well as "other election finance matters, non-disclosure of material facts and inaccurate financial reporting” including failing to disclose the involvement of a non-Canadian citizen in her campaign which could amount to foreign interference during an election.

== Early life ==
Dhalla was born in Winnipeg, Manitoba. She first attracted international attention in 1984, when she was ten years old and living in Winnipeg's north end. After Indian soldiers took part in military action at the Golden Temple in Amritsar, Dhalla wrote a letter to Indira Gandhi, then Prime Minister of India, advocating for peace and justice.

Dhalla attended McMaster University for her first year of university on a full scholarship. She then resumed studies at the University of Winnipeg and received a Bachelor of Science degree in biochemistry, with a minor in political science, in 1995. She instead moved to Toronto in the same year, and graduated as a Doctor of Chiropractic from the Canadian Memorial Chiropractic College in 1999. Upon graduating she started a chain of private multidisciplinary healthcare clinics in the Greater Toronto Area.

Dhalla has also pursued a career in acting, working in India for six months and playing a role in Kyon? Kis Liye? (Why? and for Whom?), a Bollywood-inspired Hindi-language film shot in Hamilton, Ontario.

== Political career ==
Dhalla was politically active from a young age and volunteered for Winnipeg Liberal candidate David Walker in the 1988 federal election, and later became a prominent member of the Manitoba Young Liberals. Dhalla worked on numerous political campaigns, co-chairing different election committees and volunteering in many provincial and federal political campaigns. In 1998, she was elected as youth representative the Liberal Party of Canada's standing committee on multiculturalism at the annual policy convention. Dhalla was elected as a delegate to the 1990 Liberal Leadership Convention in Calgary and was one of the first Young Liberals in Manitoba to support Paul Martin. Dhalla again supported Martin's bid to become Liberal Party leader in 2003.

=== Member of Parliament ===
==== In government (2004–2006) ====
In May 2004, Prime Minister Paul Martin nominated Dhalla as the Liberal candidate for Brampton—Springdale in the 2004 federal election. This decision was opposed by the local Liberal Party riding executive, who had favoured Andrew Kania for the nomination. The deputy campaign director for the Liberal Party defended Dhalla's selection, describing her as a star candidate who would be beneficial to the party. Even though the Liberal Party was reduced to a minority government Dhalla was elected by a comfortable margin on June 28, 2004.

Dhalla was a prominent organizer of the "Canada for Asia" benefit concert in January 2005, along with Senator Jerry Grafstein and singer Tom Cochrane. The event raised money for victims of the previous month's tsunami disaster in southeast Asia. She travelled with the Prime Minister to Sri Lanka and India in 2005 on a trade mission visit to promote trade between both nations. In October 2005, Dhalla organized a relief effort for victims of an earthquake in Pakistan. In parliament Dhalla introduced her first private members bill to create a secretariat for foreign credentials recognition. This bill was passed in the House of Commons thus assisting recent Canadian immigrants in gaining professional employment.

Dhalla voted in favour of Canada's same-sex marriage legislation in 2005, noting to the media that while it was in opposition to her beliefs, it was right under the Canadian Charter of Rights and Freedoms.

In late 2005, the Liberal government was defeated by a motion of no confidence, and a new election was called for early 2006. Dhalla officially launched her re-election campaign in early December, with Bollywood actor Arjun Rampal as a star attendee. Conservative candidate Sam Hundal attempted to use same-sex marriage as a wedge issue among recent immigrant voters, but was unsuccessful. Dhalla was easily re-elected, while the Conservatives won a minority government at the national level.

==== In opposition (2006–2011) ====
After the election, Dhalla was appointed as the Liberal Health Critic in the Official Opposition. In June 2006, she criticized Health Minister Tony Clement over a possible conflict of interest relating to his ownership of shares in Prudential Chem Inc.

In June 2006, it came to light that Conservatives had tried to convince Dhalla to cross the floor and join the party, as part of a campaign to win the support of youth, women and ethnic voters. She turned down the offer, saying that the Conservatives do not represent her values. She later criticized Wajid Khan for crossing from the Liberals to the Conservatives. Khan would go on to lose re-election in 2008.

Paul Martin resigned as Liberal leader after his party's defeat in the 2006 election. Eventually Dhalla gave her support to Michael Ignatieff and was announced as the Ignatieff Leadership Campaign's national co-chair, alongside Senator David Smith and Member of Parliament Denis Coderre. Ignatieff was defeated by Stéphane Dion on the final ballot of the 2006 Liberal leadership convention.

Dion announced his new shadow cabinet in January 2007, and reassigned Dhalla from Health to Social Development. She criticized the Conservatives for cancelling the Martin government's national day-care plan, and spoke against the prospect of large, for-profit foreign firms taking over the industry. She also wrote an opinion piece for the Toronto Star newspaper in early 2008, calling for developed countries to invest the necessary resources to target tuberculosis in the global south. In Parliament Dhalla founded the HAT (HIV, Aids, Tuberculosis) caucus for parliamentarians of all political parties to bring greater awareness on the issues.

Dhalla opposed the Conservative government's changes to Canada's immigration laws in early 2008, wherein the government set an annual limit on the number of cases to be heard and gave the Immigration Minister the discretion to fast-track some applicants. Dhalla suggested that the Conservatives would show favouritism to immigrants from certain communities. She was quoted as saying, "I think they're really picking and choosing for political purposes which communities they want to work with, and that is why there is a fear among these communities that the immigration laws being proposed right now are going to have an impact on them." Dhalla also was successful in lobbying the government to allow Sikhs whose last name is Singh or Kaur to not have to attach an additional last name to immigrate to Canada.

Dhalla issued a Private Member's Bill in April 2008, calling on the federal government to apologize for the 1914 Komagata Maru incident, in which a ship with 376 mostly Sikh immigrants was denied access to Canada. The bill was unanimously passed the following month.

In 2008, Dhalla faced a difficult re-election and ultimately defeated Conservative candidate Parm Gill by a small margin amid a provincial swing from the Liberals to Conservatives. This contest was marked with the opponent's (Parm Gill's) brother being charged with the slashing of Dhalla's signs. In the 2008 election the Conservatives were re-elected to a second minority government on the national level. Shortly after the election, a Toronto man was charged with making death threats and stalking Dhalla.

In Parliament, Dhalla continued to raise issues affecting women, minorities and youth and worked to promote trade between Canada and emerging economies.

Stéphane Dion stepped down as Liberal leader after a very poor showing in the 2008 federal election. Ignatieff was duly acclaimed as interim leader in January 2009, and was officially confirmed as party leader later in the year.

In January 2009, Ignatieff appointed Dhalla as the Liberal critic for Youth and Multiculturalism.

The Globe and Mail columnist Margaret Wente has described Dhalla as unpopular among her colleagues in the Liberal parliamentary caucus, where she is viewed as a "high maintenance" self-promoter. In a survey of parliamentary staffers from the Hill Times, Dhalla was voted the worst MP to work for, and the pollsters suggested that she had "more [staff] turnover than anyone on the hill".

Dhalla was also said to be more interested in the limelight than in doing parliamentary work, with a former caucus colleague saying "It's everything starting with making sure she's in every photo-op with the leader. I often hear of events where she calls the organizers and says 'I want to speak,' even though she wasn't invited", and she showed up at the 2009 Liberal convention in a white stretch limo. When the caregivers' controversy broke out, one MP was quoted as saying "I don't get the sense that too many people are feeling all that sorry for her".

=== Controversies ===
In 2007, an investigation was launched by Service Canada investigators regarding allegations Dhalla made in the process of her decision to terminate the employment of a Parliamentary staffer. The investigation noted that while the staffer was on medical leave, Dhalla claimed the staffer was not actually ill, however the investigation concluded that in spite of multiple requests for evidence to substantiate her claims, the investigator was given no evidence from Dhalla, and considerable evidence to the contrary had been presented. This led the investigator to formally warn Dhalla that she would be personally responsible for any legal costs incurred as a result of the wrongful termination. A few weeks prior, while speaking in her role as the Liberal Party's official Opposition Critic for Service Canada, Dhalla chastised the Conservative government's policies at a Parliamentary committee meeting reviewing the employment insurance system — specifically speaking about weaknesses being exploited by employers who wrongfully terminate employees.

Dhalla has tried to block the release of a DVD of a Bollywood movie she starred in before she was elected to Parliament. Dhalla has claimed that images of her used for promoting the film were doctored—something the film's producers have denied. Dhalla has also denied producers claims she signed a distribution waiver, was paid $2,000, or gave a supportive TV interview at the premiere in a cinema that screens made-in-India movies. The producers claim to have a witness who saw Dhalla sign the waiver, although purporting that the waiver itself was "destroyed in a fire".

==== January 2008 India visit ====
Dhalla travelled to the Indian state of Punjab in January 2008. While attending a Non-Resident Indian (NRI) seminar, she called on the state government to introduce more stringent laws to prevent the abuse of married women. She later visited her parents' village of Mullanpur.

During this trip, a member of Dhalla's staff had a purse stolen by two children. Allegations later surfaced that the children were beaten by the police after being apprehended, and a local television station ran an out-of-context quote from Dhalla that seemed to imply she condoned the violence. Dhalla clarified that she condemned any type of violence against children and called for an investigation into the incident.

==== Caregivers controversy ====
On May 5, 2009, the Toronto Star newspaper ran a front-page story with allegations that two caregivers hired to look after Dhalla's mother had been illegally employed and mistreated. During a public forum with Ontario Liberal cabinet ministers Peter Fonseca and Kathleen Wynne present, the caregivers said that their passports were seized, they worked unpaid overtime, and they were forced to do non-caregiver jobs. Fonseca and Wynne faced accusations in the Ontario legislature that they covered up the incident, with Ontario NDP leader Andrea Horwath describing it as " absolutely shocking" that the ministers did nothing to investigate these allegations. Premier Dalton McGuinty defended his ministers, while conceding that both of them "exhibited a bit of a tin ear". A third caregiver later came forward with similar charges. She later released a statement indicating that she had no involvement with the hiring or supervision of the women.

Dhalla stepped down as the Liberal Youth and Multiculturalism Critic on May 6 and called for a federal ethics investigation to clear her name. She held a press conference two days later in which she described the allegations against her as a coordinated attack on her reputation. A subsequent The Globe and Mail article suggested that she had few supporters within the federal Liberal caucus, and that other MPs considered her a "high maintenance" self-promoter, demanding on her staff and unwilling to engage in the mundane details of parliamentary life. Some Liberal MPs have publicly defended her, however, including Judy Sgro. Dhalla's lawyer suggested that the controversy was part of a partisan smear campaign orchestrated by her political opponents.

On the day after Dhalla's appearance, Agathe Mason, the executive director of a Toronto support group for immigrant women called Intercede, testified before the Commons committee that she had called Dhalla (rather than her brother) when one of the caregivers complained about her passport being withheld. Mason said that she informed Dhalla she was breaking the law and had 24 hours to return the passport, and that to her recollection the passport was returned the following day. Dhalla had previously rejected Mason's accusations, saying that she had never spoken with anyone at Intercede.

Immigration Minister Jason Kenney denied the suggestion of political interference, saying he had no personal knowledge of the matter until it was reported by the media.

== Post-parliamentary career ==
Dhalla was defeated by Conservative Parm Gill in the 2011 federal election.

Dhalla organized a press conference on October 5, 2014, with the intention of declaring her candidacy to be the Liberal nominee in Brampton—Springdale for the 2015 federal election but she instead announced that, "After much thought and much reflection, I will not be running in the next federal election". At her announcement she was surrounded by election signs that had the name of the Liberal Party blacked out.

On January 22, 2025, Dhalla announced that she would enter the Liberal Party of Canada leadership election to replace Prime Minister Justin Trudeau. In February, Dhalla sought permission from the party to use a translator for the French-language debate (as she cannot speak French) although she noted that she would make her opening and closing statements in French, but her request was denied. On February 20, the Globe and Mail reported that Dhalla's campaign was being investigated over allegations of irregularities. The day after, Dhalla was disqualified by the party due to multiple allegations of ten irregularities in her campaign ranging foreign interference to inaccurate financial reporting. Dhalla denied the allegations and appealed the verdict. Her appeal was rejected by the party on February 24.

== Personal life ==
Dhalla's brother, Neil, died in December 2021.

Her cousin, Bava Dhillon, is a member of the Sapotaweyak Cree Nation and ran for chief in 2021.

She currently serves as the CEO of the Dhalla Group, which is in the "healthcare, real estate, and hospitality" industries.

== Electoral record ==
2011 Canadian federal election
Party	Candidate	Votes	%	±%	Expenditures
Conservative	Parm Gill	24,617	48.3%	–	–
Liberal	Ruby Dhalla	14,231	27.9%	–	–
New Democratic	Manjit Grewal	9,963	19.6%	–	–
Green	Mark Hoffberg	1,926	3.8%	–	–
Communist	Liz Rowley	219	0.4%	–	–
Total valid votes		50,956	100.0%	–	

2008 Canadian federal election: Brampton—Springdale
Party	Candidate	Votes	%	±%	Expenditures
Liberal	Ruby Dhalla	18,577	41.03	−6.3	$80,011
Conservative	Parm Gill	17,804	39.32	+5.5	$86,444
New Democratic	Mani Singh	5,238	11.57	−6.1	$21,152
Green	Dave Finlay	3,516	7.76	+3.9	$746
Communist	Dimitrios Kabitsis	135	0.29	+0.1	$407
Total valid votes/expense limit		45,270	100.0	–	$87,594
Total rejected ballots		419	0.92		
Turnout		45,689	54.24	−7.0	
Electors on the lists		84,239			

2006 Canadian federal election: Brampton—Springdale
Party	Candidate	Votes	%	±%	Expenditures
Liberal	Ruby Dhalla	22,294	47.3	−0.4	$74,424
Conservative	Sam Hundal	14,492	30.8	+3.3	$67,020
New Democratic	Anna Mather	8,345	17.7	−2.2	$13,867
Green	Ian Raymond Chiocchio	1,853	3.9	−0.8	$1,280
Communist	U.J.W. Rallage	110	0.2	–	$1,108
Total valid votes		47,094	100.0		
Total rejected ballots		220	0.5		
Turnout		47,314	61.2	+6.3	
Electors on the lists		77,368			
Sources: Official Results, Elections Canada and Financial Returns, Elections Canada.

2004 Canadian federal election: Brampton—Springdale
Party	Candidate	Votes	%	Expenditures
Liberal	Ruby Dhalla	19,385	47.7	$61,377
Conservative	Sam Hundal	11,182	27.5	$72,905
New Democratic	Kathy Pounder	8,038	19.8	$12,009
Green	Nick Hudson	1,927	4.7	$944
Communist	Gurdev Singh Mattu	86	0.2	$599
Total valid votes		40,618	100.0	
Total rejected ballots		294	0.7	
Turnout		40,912	54.9	
Electors on the lists		74,591		
Percentage change figures are factored for redistribution. Conservative Party percentages are contrasted with the combined Canadian Alliance and Progressive Conservative percentages from 2000.
Official Results, Elections Canada and Financial Returns, Elections Canada.
