= Bal Gosal =

Canadian politician

The Honourable Baljit Singh Gosal PC
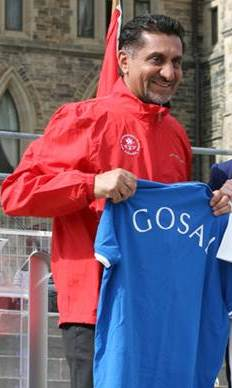

Minister of State for Sport
- In office May 18, 2011 – November 4, 2015
- Prime Minister: Stephen Harper
- Preceded by: Gary Lunn
- Succeeded by: Carla Qualtrough

Member of Parliament for Bramalea—Gore—Malton
- In office May 2, 2011 – August 4, 2015
- Preceded by: Gurbax Singh Malhi
- Succeeded by: Riding Abolished

Personal details
- Born: Baljit Singh Gosal; May 4, 1960 (age 66) Ratenda, Punjab, India
- Party: Conservative
- Spouse: Pawanjit Gosal
- Profession: Insurance broker

Baljit Singh Gosal PC (born May 4, 1960) is a Canadian politician who served as the Conservative Member of Parliament (MP) for the electoral district of Bramalea—Gore—Malton from 2011 until 2015. He served as Minister of State (Sport) in the cabinet of Prime Minister Stephen Harper. Gosal was one of five visible minorities serving in the Harper cabinet. He was defeated by Liberal candidate Ramesh Sangha in the 2015 election.

== Early life ==
Baljit Singh Gosal was born on May 4, 1960 in Ratainda, in the Nawanshahr District of Punjab, India into a Jatt Sikh family. Gosal immigrated to Canada in 1981 settling in Northern British Columbia. Soon after, he moved to Brampton with his wife, Pawanjit. His formal education includes a Bachelor of Science degree from DAV College Jalandhar in 1981 and a Stationary Engineer 4th class Certificate. Gosal began working in the financial sector first in 1984 for McDonnell Douglas Canada and later in 1994 for Prudential Insurance, which later became London Life. He started working in the Property and Casualty Insurance by joining Holman Insurance Brokers Ltd. and then later in 2004 Gosal joined Goodison Insurance and Financial Services and in 2008 he joined Rai Grant insurance brokers where he worked as an insurance broker and a financial security advisor.

An active member of the Brampton community, Gosal had been a member of the Peel Regional Police Services Board, Peel Children's Aid Society and on the Brampton Board of Trade Marketing Committee. He also has coached and organized amateur soccer and volunteered at the YMCA. Gosal served as the Treasurer and founding member of the Ontario Federation of Sports and Cultural Organization, and as the Director, past Secretary, and Treasurer of the Ontario Khalsa Darbar Sports and Cultural Centre. He and his wife have three children.

== Politics ==
In the 2003 provincial election, Gosal unsuccessfully ran for the PC party in Etobicoke North.

In the 2006 federal election, Gosal ran unsuccessfully for the Conservatives in Brampton West.

In the 2011 federal election, Gosal defeated long-time Liberal MP Gurbax Singh Malhi and future NDP leader Jagmeet Singh in a close three-way race.

As Minister of State for Sport, Gosal was the Minister responsible for Canada at the 2012 summer Olympics in London and lead the Canadian delegation to the 2014 Sochi winter Olympics. On June 29, 2012, Gosal announced the endorsement of all Canadian provincial ministers responsible for sport of the New Canadian Sport Policy.

According to a social media analysis, Gosal was one of Canada's most active MPs on Twitter.

During the 2015 federal election, one volunteer from Bal Gosal's campaign team were caught on video, destroying campaign signs for opposition candidates, prompting Liberal candidate Ramesh Sangha to file a complaint with Peel Regional Police and Elections Canada. In a written statement, the Gosal campaign stated that it admonished the actions of the videotaped volunteers and had dismissed them from the campaign. Gosal lost re-election.

In 2018, Gosal unsuccessfully ran for Mayor of Brampton.

== Electoral record ==
=== Municipal ===
2018 Brampton Mayoral Election	Vote	%
Patrick Brown	46,894	44.43
Linda Jeffrey (X)	42,993	40.73
Baljit Gosal	5,319	5.04
John Sprovieri	5,028	4.76
Wesley Jackson	2,442	2.31
Vinod Kumar Mahesan	1,905	1.80
Mansoor Ameersulthan	972	0.92

=== Brampton Centre ===
2015 Canadian federal election: Brampton Centre
Party	Candidate	Votes	%	±%	Expenditures
Liberal	Ramesh Sangha	19,277	48.64	+23.29	$120,004.74
Conservative	Bal Gosal	13,345	33.67	-12.73	$183,194.43
New Democratic	Rosemary Keenan	5,993	15.12	-8.08	$33,702.51
Green	Saul Marquard T. Bottcher	844	2.13	-2.32	$144.64
Marxist–Leninist	Frank Chilelli	173	0.44	–	–
Total valid votes/expense limit		39,632	100.00		$199,305.79
Total rejected ballots		264	0.66	–	
Turnout		39,896	61.72	–	
Eligible voters		64,640			
Liberal notional gain from Conservative		Swing		+18.01	
Source: Elections Canada

=== Bramalea—Gore—Malton ===
2011 Canadian federal election
Party	Candidate	Votes	%	±%	Expenditures
Conservative	Bal Gosal	19,907	34.44%	-2.68%	–
New Democratic	Jagmeet Singh Dhaliwal	19,368	33.51%	+24.49%	–
Liberal	Gurbax Singh Malhi	16,402	29.40%	-15.65%	–
Green	John Moulton	1,748	3.02%	-2.14%	–
Marxist–Leninist	Frank Chilelli	371	0.64%	+0.02%	
Total valid votes		57,796	100.00%	–	
Total rejected ballots		–	–	–	
Turnout		–	–	–	–

Source: Elections Canada

=== Brampton West ===
2006 Canadian federal election: Brampton West
Party	Candidate	Votes	%	±%
Liberal	Colleen Beaumier	27,988	49.1	+4.7
Conservative	Bal Gosal	20,345	35.7	-4.3
New Democratic	Jagtar Singh Shergill	6,310	11.1	+0.6
Green	Jaipaul Massey-Singh	2,340	4.1	+0.7
Total valid votes		56,983	100.0	

=

=== Etobicoke North ===
2003 Ontario general election: Etobicoke North
Party	Candidate	Votes	%	±%
Liberal	Shafiq Qaadri	16,727	53.98	+19.95
Progressive Conservative	Bal Gosal	6,978	22.52	–15.75
New Democratic	Kuldip Singh Sodhi	3,516	11.35	–12.57
Independent	Frank Acri	1,990	6.42	–
Family Coalition	Teresa Ceolin	1,275	4.11	+2.42
Green	Mir Kamal	503	1.62	–
Total valid votes		30,989	98.71	
Total rejected, unmarked and declined ballots		405	1.29	–0.18
Turnout		31,394	47.91	–7.01
Eligible voters		65,527		
Liberal gain from Progressive Conservative		Swing		+17.85
Source: Elections Ontario
