= Brampton East (federal electoral district) =

Federal electoral district in Ontario, Canada

Coordinates: 43.783°N 79.710°W

Ontario electoral district
- Interactive map of riding boundaries from the 2025 federal election

Federal electoral district
- Legislature: House of Commons
MP
Maninder Sidhu
Liberal
- District created: 2013
- First contested: 2015
- Last contested: 2021
- District webpage: profile, map

Demographics
- Population (2021): 131,677
- Electors (2015): 65,818
- Area (km²): 84.90
- Pop. density (per km²): 1,551
- Census division: Peel
- Census subdivision: Brampton (part)

Brampton East (French: Brampton-Est) is a federal electoral district in Ontario. It encompasses a portion of Ontario previously included in the electoral districts of Bramalea—Gore—Malton and Brampton—Springdale.

Brampton East was created by the 2012 federal electoral boundaries redistribution and was legally defined in the 2013 representation order. It came into effect upon the call of the 42nd Canadian federal election.

Brampton East has the highest proportion of South Asians in Canada (70.1% of the population identified as South Asian in 2021). Brampton East also has the second-highest percentage of Sikhs (40.4%, behind only Surrey-Newton) and the highest percentage of Hindus (23.8%) of any riding in Canada. Brampton East has the lowest median age in Ontario at 32.6.

== Demographics ==
Religion in Brampton East (2021)
1. Sikh (40.4%)
2. Hindu (23.8%)
3. Christian (22.3%)
4. Muslim (7.40%)
5. Buddhist (0.80%)
6. Other (0.40%)
7. Irreligious (4.90%)

According to the 2021 Canadian census

Languages: 35.0% Punjabi, 31.4% English, 5.4% Gujarati, 3.6% Tamil, 3.0% Hindi, 2.1% Urdu, 1.0% Assyrian, 1.0% Italian

Religions: 40.4% Sikh, 23.8% Hindu, 22.3% Christian (10.4% Catholic, 1.9% Pentecostal, 10.0% Other), 7.4% Muslim, 4.9% None

Median income: $33,600 (2020)

Average income: $44,160 (2020)

Panethnic groups in Brampton East (2011−2021)
Panethnic group	2021		2016		2011	
Panethnic group	Pop.	%	Pop.	%	Pop.	%
South Asian	91,975	70.13%	80,035	65.88%	59,885	60.29%
African	13,345	10.18%	13,775	11.34%	12,415	12.5%
European (Note: Statistic includes all persons that did not make up part of a visible minority or an indigenous identity.)	8,620	6.57%	11,210	9.23%	12,140	12.22%
Middle Eastern (Note: Statistic includes total responses of "West Asian" and "Arab" under visible minority section on census.)	3,900	2.97%	3,625	2.98%	2,835	2.85%
Southeast Asian (Note: Statistic includes total responses of "Filipino" and "Southeast Asian" under visible minority section on census.)	3,635	2.77%	3,620	2.98%	4,165	4.19%
Latin American	1,610	1.23%	2,220	1.83%	1,545	1.56%
East Asian (Note: Statistic includes total responses of "Chinese", "Korean", and "Japanese" under visible minority section on census.)	1,010	0.77%	1,290	1.06%	1,630	1.64%
Indigenous	45	0.03%	225	0.19%	160	0.16%
Other/multiracial (Note: Statistic includes total responses of "Visible minority, n.i.e." and "Multiple visible minorities" under visible minority section on census.)	6,990	5.33%	5,495	4.52%	4,560	4.59%
Total responses	131,140	99.59%	121,485	99.58%	99,335	99.62%
Total population	131,677	100%	122,000	100%	99,712	100%
Notes: Totals greater than 100% due to multiple origin responses. Demographics based on 2012 Canadian federal electoral redistribution riding boundaries.

== Members of Parliament ==
This riding has elected the following members of Parliament:

Parliament	Years	Member	Party
Brampton East; Riding created from Bramalea—Gore—Malton and Brampton—Springdale
42nd	2015–2018	Raj Grewal	Liberal
42nd	2018–2019	Raj Grewal	Independent
43rd	2019–2021	Maninder Sidhu	Liberal
44th	2021–2025	Maninder Sidhu	Liberal
45th	2025–present	Maninder Sidhu	Liberal

== Election results ==
Graph of election results in Brampton East (minor parties that never got 2% of the vote or didn't run consistently are omitted)

2025 Canadian federal election
Party	Candidate	Votes	%	±%	Expenditures
Liberal	Maninder Sidhu	23,616	48.59	–4.60	
Conservative	Bob Dosanjh Singh	21,731	44.71	+16.15	
People's	Jeff Lal	2,305	4.74	+2.11	
New Democratic	Haramrit Singh	821	1.69	–13.93	
Centrist	Abdus S Kissana	132	0.27	N/A	
Total valid votes/expense limit		48,605	98.78		
Total rejected ballots		598	1.22		
Turnout		49,203	66.74		
Eligible voters		73,721			
Liberal hold		Swing		–10.38	
Source: Elections Canada

2021 Canadian federal election: Brampton East
Party	Candidate	Votes	%	±%	Expenditures
Liberal	Maninder Sidhu	22,120	53.5	+6.1	$97,152.25
Conservative	Naval Bajaj	11,647	28.2	+4.3	$107,663.35
New Democratic	Gail Bannister-Clarke	6,511	15.7	-10.6	$55,251.17
People's	Manjeet Singh	1,073	2.6	+2.1	$4,670.78
Total valid votes/expense limit		41,351	–	–	$109,233.57
Total rejected ballots		436			
Turnout		40,787	54.6		
Eligible voters		76,588			
Liberal hold		Swing			
Source: Elections Canada

2021 federal election redistributed results
Party	Vote	%
Liberal	20,193	53.19
Conservative	10,841	28.56
New Democratic	5,928	15.62
People's	1,000	2.63

2019 Canadian federal election: Brampton East
Party	Candidate	Votes	%	±%	Expenditures
Liberal	Maninder Sidhu	24,050	47.4	-4.92	$92,279.91
New Democratic	Saranjit Singh	13,368	26.3	+3.29	$94,035.50
Conservative	Ramona Singh	12,125	23.9	+0.36	none listed
Green	Teresa Burgess-Ogilvie	666	1.3	+0.17	$885.60
People's	Gaurav Walia	244	0.5		$42.92
Independent	Manpreet Othi	211	0.4		$9,387.07
Canada's Fourth Front	Partap Dua	89	0.2		none listed
Total valid votes/expense limit		50,753	100.0		
Total rejected ballots		510			
Turnout		51,263	66.4		
Eligible voters		77,195			
Liberal hold		Swing		-4.11	
Source: Elections Canada

2015 Canadian federal election: Brampton East
Party	Candidate	Votes	%	±%	Expenditures
Liberal	Raj Grewal	23,652	52.32	+21.67	$149,172.33
Conservative	Naval Bajaj	10,642	23.54	-5.94	$189,039.82
New Democratic	Harbaljit Singh Kahlon	10,400	23.01	-14.64	–
Green	Kyle Lacroix	512	1.13	-0.57	$144.64
Total valid votes/expense limit		45,206	100.00		$201,381.89
Total rejected ballots		304	0.67	–	
Turnout		45,510	67.20	–	
Eligible voters		67,721			
Liberal notional gain from New Democratic		Swing		+18.15	
Source: Elections Canada

2011 federal election redistributed results
Party	Vote	%
New Democratic	10,775	37.7
Liberal	8,774	30.7
Conservative	8,439	29.5
Green	487	1.2
Others	147	0.5

== See also ==
- List of Canadian electoral districts
- Historical federal electoral districts of Canada
