= Brampton Centre (federal electoral district) =

Federal electoral district in Ontario, Canada

Coordinates: 43.705°N 79.730°W

Ontario electoral district
- Interactive map of riding boundaries from the 2025 federal election

Federal electoral district
- Legislature: House of Commons
MP
Amandeep Sodhi
Liberal
- District created: 1996
- First contested: 1997
- Last contested: 2025
- District webpage: profile, map

Demographics
- Population (2016): 102,270
- Electors (2015): 64,148
- Area (km²): 43.70
- Pop. density (per km²): 2,340.3
- Census division: Peel
- Census subdivision: Brampton (part)

Brampton Centre (French: Brampton-Centre) is a federal electoral district in Ontario, Canada, that is represented in the House of Commons of Canada. This riding was created in 1996 from parts of Brampton riding and in 2013, Elections Canada redistributed 3 ridings in the city of Brampton to bring back Brampton Centre. This was primarily due to large population increases in the Greater Toronto Area, and Peel Region in particular.

== Geography ==
The riding was recreated for the federal election held 19 October 2015. The newly carved out Brampton Centre riding was reconstituted by taking portions of Brampton—Springdale, Bramalea—Gore—Malton and a small portion of Mississauga—Brampton South.

The new boundaries start from Hurontario Street and Bovaird Drive West; South on Main Street to the intersection of Vodden Street; East on Vodden Street East to Kennedy Road; Kennedy Road south to Steeles Avenue East; West on Steeles Avenue to Hurontario Street; South on Hurontario Street to Highway 407; East on Highway 407 to Torbram Road; North on Torbram Road to Williams Parkway; West on Williams Parkway to Highway 410; North on Highway 410 to Bovaird Drive East; West on Bovaird Drive East to Main Street.

== Demographics ==
According to the 2021 Canadian census

- Languages : 54.0% English, 9.6% Punjabi, 3.4% Urdu, 3.2% Spanish, 2.6% Tagalog, 2.5% Hindi, 1.6% Portuguese, 1.9% Gujarati, 1.0% Italian, 1.2% Tamil
- Religions: 49.7% Christian (24.3% Catholic, 2.7% Pentecostal, 2.5% Anglican, 2.0% United Church, 1.2% Christian Orthodox, 1.0% Baptist, 16.0% Other), 12.5% Hindu, 10.3% Sikh, 9.5% Muslim, 1.3% Buddhist, 16.1% None
- Median income: $37,200 (2020)
- Average income: $43,680 (2020)

Panethnic groups in Brampton Centre (2011−2021)
Panethnic group	2021		2016		2011	
Panethnic group	Pop.	%	Pop.	%	Pop.	%
South Asian	33,555	32.32%	26,630	26.17%	26,905	26.13%
European (Note: Statistic includes all persons that did not make up part of a visible minority or an indigenous identity.)	32,475	31.28%	39,705	39.02%	46,510	45.16%
African	15,845	15.26%	15,570	15.3%	12,450	12.09%
Southeast Asian (Note: Statistic includes total responses of "Filipino" and "Southeast Asian" under visible minority section on census.)	7,120	6.86%	6,575	6.46%	5,535	5.37%
Latin American	4,675	4.5%	3,925	3.86%	3,395	3.3%
Middle Eastern (Note: Statistic includes total responses of "West Asian" and "Arab" under visible minority section on census.)	2,455	2.36%	1,985	1.95%	1,370	1.33%
East Asian (Note: Statistic includes total responses of "Chinese", "Korean", and "Japanese" under visible minority section on census.)	1,315	1.27%	1,890	1.86%	2,145	2.08%
Indigenous	1,075	1.04%	1,165	1.14%	1,130	1.1%
Other/multiracial (Note: Statistic includes total responses of "Visible minority, n.i.e." and "Multiple visible minorities" under visible minority section on census.)	5,325	5.13%	4,305	4.23%	3,545	3.44%
Total responses	103,835	99.31%	101,755	99.5%	102,980	99.86%
Total population	104,557	100%	102,270	100%	103,122	100%
Notes: Totals greater than 100% due to multiple origin responses. Demographics based on 2012 Canadian federal electoral redistribution riding boundaries.

== Members of Parliament ==
The riding has elected the following members of Parliament:

Parliament	Years	Member	Party
Brampton Centre; Riding created from Brampton
36th	1997–2000	Sarkis Assadourian	Liberal
37th	2000–2004	Sarkis Assadourian	Liberal
Riding dissolved into Brampton—Springdale and Brampton West
Riding re-created from Bramalea—Gore—Malton, Brampton—Springdale and Mississauga—Brampton South
42nd	2015–2019	Ramesh Sangha	Liberal
43rd	2019–2021	Ramesh Sangha	Liberal
43rd	2021–2021	Ramesh Sangha	Independent
44th	2021–2025	Shafqat Ali	Liberal
45th	2025–present	Amandeep Sodhi	Liberal

== Election results ==
=== 2015–present ===
Graph of election results in Brampton Centre (since 2011 (redistributed), minor parties that never got 2% of the vote or didn't run consistently are omitted)

2025 Canadian federal election
Party	Candidate	Votes	%	±%	Expenditures
Liberal	Amandeep Sodhi	19,716	48.37	+0.05	
Conservative	Taran Chahal	19,105	46.87	+15.45	
New Democratic	Anil Boodhai	1,085	2.66	−13.12	
Green	Ray Shaver	469	1.15	N/A	
People's	Harsimran Kaur Hundal	288	0.71	−2.89	
Centrist	Taha Nazir	97	0.24	N/A	
Total valid votes/expense limit		40,760	99.18	+0.6	
Total rejected ballots		338	0.82	-0.6	
Turnout		41,098	62.08	+8.03	
Eligible voters		66,201			
Liberal hold		Swing		−7.70	
Source: Elections Canada
Note: number of eligible voters does not include voting day registrations.

2021 federal election redistributed results
Party	Vote	%
Liberal	16,818	48.32
Conservative	10,935	31.42
New Democratic	5,493	15.78
People's	1,253	3.60
Others	305	0.88

2021 Canadian federal election: Brampton Centre
Party	Candidate	Votes	%	±%	Expenditures
Liberal	Shafqat Ali	16,189	47.66	+0.45	$93,043.67
Conservative	Jagdeep Singh	11,038	32.46	+5.56	$36,728.21
New Democratic	Jim McDowell	5,932	17.46	-2.21	$18,285.43
Independent	Ronni Shino	824	2.43	–	none listed
Total valid votes/expense limit		33,971	98.58	-0.23	$104,033.21
Total rejected ballots		488	1.42	+0.23	
Turnout		34,459	54.05	-5.22	
Eligible voters		63,751			
Liberal hold		Swing		-2.56	
Source: Elections Canada

2019 Canadian federal election: Brampton Centre
Party	Candidate	Votes	%	±%	Expenditures
Liberal	Ramesh Sangha	18,771	47.21	-1.43	$84,508.26
Conservative	Pawanjit Gosal	10,696	26.90	-6.77	$102,185.61
New Democratic	Jordan Boswell	7,819	19.67	+4.45	$47,671.91
Green	Pauline Thornham	1,685	4.24	+2.11	$1,108.69
People's	Baljit Bawa	681	1.71		$40,458.58
Marxist–Leninist	David Gershuny	106	0.27		$0.00
Total valid votes/expense limit		39,758	98.81		
Total rejected ballots		480	1.19		
Turnout		40,238	59.27		
Eligible voters		67,890			
Liberal hold		Swing		+2.67	
Source: Elections Canada

2015 Canadian federal election: Brampton Centre
Party	Candidate	Votes	%	±%	Expenditures
Liberal	Ramesh Sangha	19,277	48.64	+23.29	$120,004.74
Conservative	Bal Gosal	13,345	33.67	-12.73	$183,194.43
New Democratic	Rosemary Keenan	5,993	15.12	-8.08	$33,702.51
Green	Saul Marquard T. Bottcher	844	2.13	-2.32	$144.64
Marxist–Leninist	Frank Chilelli	173	0.44	–	–
Total valid votes/expense limit		39,632	100.00		$199,305.79
Total rejected ballots		264	0.66	–	
Turnout		39,896	61.72	–	
Eligible voters		64,640			
Liberal notional gain from Conservative		Swing		+18.01	
Source: Elections Canada

2011 federal election redistributed results
Party	Vote	%
Conservative	16,148	46.41
Liberal	8,822	25.35
New Democratic	8,074	23.20
Green	1,548	4.45
Others	205	0.59

=== 1997–2000 ===
Graph of election results in Brampton Centre (1996-2003, minor parties that never got 2% of the vote or didn't run consistently are omitted)

2000 Canadian federal election: Brampton Centre
Party	Candidate	Votes	%	±%
Liberal	Sarkis Assadourian	18,365	50.64	+1.79
Progressive Conservative	Beryl Ford	9,229	25.45	+10.70
Alliance	Prabhat Kapur	6,247	17.23	–11.16
New Democratic	Sue Slean	1,795	4.95	–2.72
Green	Andrew K. Roy	628	1.73	
Total valid votes		36,264	100.0	
Liberal hold		Swing		–4.46

1997 Canadian federal election: Brampton Centre
Party	Candidate	Votes	%
Liberal	Sarkis Assadourian	18,615	48.85
Reform	Don Crawford	10,817	28.39
Progressive Conservative	Sam Hundal	5,621	14.75
New Democratic	Paul Ferreira	2,923	7.67
Marxist–Leninist	André Vachon	127	0.33
Total valid votes		38,103	100.0

== See also ==
- List of Canadian electoral districts
- Historical federal electoral districts of Canada
