= 2006 Waterloo municipal election =

Municipal election in Waterloo, Canada

The 2006 Waterloo municipal election took place on November 13, 2006, to elect a mayor, councillors, regional councillors, and school trustees in the city of Waterloo, Ontario, Canada.

== Results ==
2006 Waterloo municipal election: Mayor of Waterloo
Candidate	Votes	%
Brenda Halloran	11,459	50.47
(x)Herb Epp	7,364	32.43
Brian Turnbull	3,881	17.09
Total valid votes	22,704	100

2006 Waterloo election, Region of Waterloo councillor (two elected)
Candidate	Total votes	% of total votes
Sean Strickland	13,386	36.73
(incumbent)Jane Mitchell	11,039	30.29
(incumbent)Mike Connolly	8,624	23.66
Ed Spike	1,845	5.06
Mike Clancy	1,553	4.26
Total valid votes	36,447	100.00

Source: 2006 Municipal Election Information, City of Waterloo.
