= Blacklock's Reporter =

Canadian internet publication

- Type: news website
- Format: Online Newspaper
- Publisher: Holly Doan
- Editor: Tom Korski
- Founded: 2012; 14 years ago
- Headquarters: Ottawa, Ontario, Canada
- Website: blacklocks.ca

Blacklock's Reporter (founded October 2012) is an Ottawa-based Internet publication covering Canadian government administration. It publishes several articles each day, along with book reviews, poetry and guest commentaries.

Six reporters, including Tom Korski, banded together to launch the news site. Its name is derived from a Montreal Gazette war correspondent, Thomas Hyland Blacklock (died 1934), who had been head of the Canadian Parliamentary Press Gallery.

In November 2012, Blacklock's won a dispute with the Canadian Parliamentary Press Gallery to have its journalists accredited.

Blacklock's won an Ontario Small Claims Court lawsuit over breach of its paywalls.

In November 2016, the Federal Court of Canada rejected an action for breach of copyright by Blacklock's against the Department of Finance of Canada. The Court held the sharing of paywall-protected articles among a relatively small group of people connected with the news item was fair dealing. The Court ordered Blacklock's to pay the department costs of $65,000, stating that "the litigation should never have been commenced, let alone carried to trial", and that Blacklock's demand for compensation was "based on unwarranted and self-serving assertion of indiscriminate and widespread infringement".
