= Canadian federal election results in Brampton, Mississauga and Oakville =

Seats obtained by party
Liberal
Conservative
Progressive Conservative (defunct)

== Regional Profile ==
This suburban area had leaned Progressive Conservative from 1979 until 1993 when it swung hard to the Liberals primarily due to the rapid growth of the Greater Toronto Area and high immigrant populations, just like the suburbs to the north of Toronto. After winning just one seat (Mississauga East) in 1988, the Liberals swept every seat in this region from 1993 to 2006. The new Conservative Party (replacing the Progressive Conservatives) won their first seats in the area in 2008, picking up Oakville and Mississauga—Erindale before sweeping the region when they formed a majority government in 2011. However, the Liberals swept the region in 2015, and again in 2019. In the 2021 Canadian federal election, the Liberals swept the region again, winning all seats with significant margins - allowing them a strong 160 seat minority.

In 2004, the Liberals won a majority of the vote in every Mississauga and Oakville-based seat, while winning just under 50% in each of the three Brampton-based seats. Their strongest riding was Mississauga East—Cooksville (57%), while their weakest seat was Brampton West (45%). In 2006, the Liberals won a majority of the votes in just three seats, with their strongest seat this time being Mississauga—Brampton South (54%) with their weakest seat being Oakville (43%), which they won by fewer than 800 votes. In 2008, the strongest Liberal seat was again Mississauga East—Cooksville, the only seat in the region where they won a majority of the vote (50%). In 2011 they were shut out of the region, but nearly won Mississauga East—Cooksville, losing it by fewer than 700 votes. In 2015, 2019 and 2021 Canadian federal elections, the Liberals won all ridings in Mississauga, Brampton, and Oakville: the Conservatives took back Brampton West in 2025 while the Liberals kept all other ridings in the region.

The Conservatives came within 5 points of winning Brampton West, their best seat in 2004, thanks to star candidate Tony Clement. In 2006, their strongest seat was Oakville, which they nearly won. Oakville remained the Conservatives' best seat in 2008 and 2011. When they swept the region in 2011, Oakville was the only riding where they won a majority of the vote (54%). Thanks to a three-way vote split, the Conservatives still won Bramalea—Gore—Malton with just 34% of the vote.

The NDP has traditionally been very weak in the region. Thanks to a strong candidacy of Jagmeet Singh, the NDP placed second in Bramalea—Gore—Malton in 2011, with 33.5% of the vote, losing the riding by fewer than 600 votes.

=== Votes by party throughout time ===
| Election | Liberal | Conservative | New Democratic | Green | People's | PC | Reform / Alliance | Others |
|---|---|---|---|---|---|---|---|---|
| 1979 | 85,030; 35.0% | —N/a | 39,293; 16.2% | —N/a | —N/a | 117,225; 48.2% | —N/a | 1,340; 0.6% |
| 1980 | 95,794; 40.7% | —N/a | 40,873; 17.4% | —N/a | —N/a | 97,214; 41.3% | —N/a | 1,575; 0.7% |
| 1984 | 87,527; 29.0% | —N/a | 44,927; 14.9% | 2,561; 0.8% | —N/a | 165,889; 55.0% | —N/a | 435; 0.1% |
| 1988 | 118,313; 36.1% | —N/a | 42,726; 13.0% | —N/a | —N/a | 159,370; 48.6% | —N/a | 6,614; 2.0% |
| 1993 | 194,214; 51.8% | —N/a | 10,214; 2.7% | 722; 0.2% | —N/a | 74,984; 20.0% | 88,722; 23.7% | 5,644; 1.5% |
| 1997 | 190,798; 54.9% | —N/a | 18,225; 5.2% | —N/a | —N/a | 72,276; 20.8% | 64,975; 18.7% | 1,429; 0.4% |
| 2000 | 192,872; 58.2% | —N/a | 12,584; 3.8% | 3,273; 1.0% | —N/a | 53,193; 16.0% | 67,407; 20.3% | 1,471; 0.4% |
| 2004 | 212,592; 51.7% | 129,714; 31.5% | 48,502; 11.8% | 17,084; 4.2% | —N/a | —N/a | —N/a | 2,186; 0.5% |
| 2006 | 226,205; 47.7% | 168,816; 35.6% | 56,694; 12.0% | 19,446; 4.1% | —N/a | —N/a | —N/a | 2,171; 0.5% |
| 2008 | 190,494; 43.4% | 170,838; 38.9% | 46,148; 10.5% | 29,384; 6.7% | —N/a | —N/a | —N/a | 1,967; 0.4% |
| 2011 | 165,925; 33.6% | 220,229; 44.6% | 91,548; 18.6% | 14,142; 2.9% | —N/a | —N/a | —N/a | 1,419; 0.3% |
| 2015 | 339,816; 51.0% | 238,968; 35.9% | 72,649; 10.9% | 12,571; 1.9% | —N/a | —N/a | —N/a | 1,885; 0.3% |
| 2019 | 361,593; 50.8% | 222,821; 31.3% | 90,648; 12.7% | 25,817; 3.6% | 7,757; 1.1% | —N/a | —N/a | 1,654; 0.2% |
| 2021 | 312,807; 50.1% | 207,982; 33.3% | 75,461; 12.1% | 6,925; 1.1% | 19,500; 3.1% | —N/a | —N/a | 1,863; 0.3% |

| Liberal Conservative New Democratic Green People's | Progressive Conservative (defunct) Alliance (defunct) Reform (defunct) |

== 2015 ==
| Electoral district | Candidates | | | | | Incumbent |
| Electoral district | Conservative | NDP | Liberal | Green | Other | Incumbent |
|---|---|---|---|---|---|---|
| Brampton Centre | Bal Gosal; 13,345; 33.67% | Rosemary Keenan; 5,993; 15.12% | Ramesh Sangha; 19,277; 48.64% | Saul Marquard T. Bottcher; 844; 2.13% | Frank Chilelli (M-L); 173; 0.44% | New District |
| Brampton East | Naval Bajaj; 10,642; 23.54% | Harbaljit Singh Kahlon; 10,400; 23.01% | Raj Grewal; 23,652; 52.32% | Kyle Lacroix; 512; 1.13% | | Bal Gosal‡ Bramalea—Gore—Malton |
| Brampton North | Parm Gill; 15,888; 32.99% | Martin Singh; 7,946; 16.50% | Ruby Sahota; 23,297; 48.37% | Pauline Thornham; 915; 1.90% | Harinderpal Hundal (Comm.); 120; 0.25% | Parm Gill; Brampton—Springdale |
| Brampton South | Kyle Seeback; 15,929; 35.04% | Amarjit Sangha; 4,843; 10.65% | Sonia Sidhu; 23,681; 52.09% | Shaun Hatton; 1,011; 2.22% | | New District |
| Brampton West | Ninder Thind; 13,068; 30.11% | Adaoma Patterson; 5,400; 12.44% | Kamal Khera; 24,256; 55.89% | Karthika Gobinath; 674; 1.55% | | Kyle Seeback‡ |
| Mississauga Centre | Julius Tiangson; 17,431; 33.62% | Farheen Khan; 4,920; 9.49% | Omar Alghabra; 28,372; 54.72% | Linh Nguyen; 1,129; 2.18% | | New District |
| Mississauga East—Cooksville | Wladyslaw Lizon; 18,353; 35.35% | Ali Naqvi; 4,481; 8.63% | Peter Fonseca; 28,154; 54.23% | Jaymini Bhikha; 766; 1.48% | Tim Sullivan (M-L); 163; 0.31% | Wladyslaw Lizon |
| Mississauga—Erin Mills | Bob Dechert; 21,716; 39.24% | Michelle Bilek; 5,206; 9.41% | Iqra Khalid; 27,520; 49.72% | Andrew Roblin; 905; 1.64% | | Bob Dechert; Mississauga—Erindale |
| Mississauga—Lakeshore | Stella Ambler; 24,435; 41.22% | Eric Guerbilsky; 4,735; 7.99% | Sven Spengemann; 28,279; 47.71% | Ariana Burgener; 1,397; 2.36% | Dagmar Sullivan (M-L); 111 0.19% | Stella Ambler; Mississauga South |
| Mississauga—Lakeshore | Stella Ambler; 24,435; 41.22% | Eric Guerbilsky; 4,735; 7.99% | Sven Spengemann; 28,279; 47.71% | Ariana Burgener; 1,397; 2.36% | Paul Woodworth (Libert.); 316 0.53% | Stella Ambler; Mississauga South |
| Mississauga—Malton | Jagdish Grewal (Note: Jagdish Grewal was expelled by the Conservative Party on 6 October; because no changes could be made to the list of confirmed candidates after 28 September, he was still listed as the Conservative candidate on the ballot.); 11,701; 26.44% | Dianne Douglas; 5,450; 12.31% | Navdeep Bains; 26,165; 59.12% | Heather Mercer; 737; 1.67% | Naresh Tharani (Ind.); 203; 0.46% | Eve Adams§ Mississauga—Brampton South |
| Mississauga—Streetsville | Brad Butt; 22,621; 40.40% | Fayaz Karim; 5,040; 9.00% | Gagan Sikand; 26,792; 47.84% | Chris Hill; 1,293; 2.31% | Yegor Tarazevich (CHP); 253; 0.45% | Brad Butt |
| Oakville | Terence Young; 27,497; 42.50% | Che Marville; 3,830; 5.92% | John Oliver; 31,956; 49.39% | David Doel; 1,420; 2.19% | | Terence Young |
| Oakville North—Burlington | Effie Triantafilopoulos; 26,342; 43.33% | Janice Best; 4,405; 7.25% | Pam Damoff; 28,415; 46.74% | Adnan Shahbaz; 968; 1.59% | David Clement (Libert.); 666; 1.10% | Lisa Raitt‡ Halton |

== 2011 ==
| Electoral district | Candidates | | | | | Incumbent |
| Electoral district | Conservative | Liberal | NDP | Green | Other | Incumbent |
|---|---|---|---|---|---|---|
| Bramalea—Gore—Malton | Bal Gosal; 19,907; 34.44% | Gurbax S. Malhi; 16,402; 28.38% | Jagmeet Singh; 19,368; 33.51% | John R.A. Moulton; 1,748; 3.02% | Frank Chilelli (M-L); 371; 0.64% | Gurbax Malhi |
| Brampton—Springdale | Parm Gill; 24,618; 48.26% | Ruby Dhalla; 14,221; 27.88% | Manijit Grewal; 10,022; 19.65% | Mark Hoffberg; 1,926; 3.78% | Elizabeth Rowley (Comm.); 219; 0.43% | Ruby Dhalla |
| Brampton West | Kyle Seeback; 28,320; 44.75% | Andrew Kania; 22,128; 34.97% | Jagtar Shergill; 11,225; 17.74% | Avtaar Soor; 1,224; 1.93% | Theodore Koum Njoh (Ind.); 387; 0.61% | Andrew Kania |
| Mississauga— Brampton South | Eve Adams; 23,632; 44.72% | Navdeep Bains; 18,579; 35.16% | Jim Glavan; 9,465; 17.91% | Benjamin Jonathon Ullysses Stone; 1,044; 1.98% | Tim Sullivan (M-L); 127; 0.24% | Navdeep Bains |
| Mississauga East—Cooksville | Wladyslaw Lizon; 18,796; 39.97% | Peter Fonseca; 18,120; 38.53% | Waseem Ahmed; 8,836; 18.79% | Jaymini Bhikha; 1,032; 2.19% | Pierre Chénier (M-L); 241; 0.51% | Albina Guarnieri† |
| Mississauga—Erindale | Robert Dechert; 29,793; 46.95% | Omar Alghabra; 21,541; 33.95% | Michelle Bilek; 10,327; 16.27% | John Fraser; 1,694; 2.67% | Dagmar Sullivan (M-L); 99; 0.16% | Bob Dechert |
| Mississauga South | Stella Ambler; 22,991; 46.48% | Paul Szabo; 18,393; 37.18% | Farah Kalbouneh; 6,354; 12.85% | Paul Simas; 1,532; 3.10% | Richard Barrett (Ind.); 194; 0.39% | Paul Szabo |
| Mississauga—Streetsville | Brad Butt; 22,104; 43.86% | Bonnie Crombie; 18,651; 37.01% | Aijaz Naqvi; 7,834; 15.55% | Chris Hill; 1,802; 3.58% | | Bonnie Crombie |
| Oakville | Terence Young; 30,068; 51.65% | Max Khan; 17,890; 30.73% | James Ede; 8,117; 13.94% | Andrew Chlobowski; 2,140; 3.68% | | Terence Young |

== 2008 ==
| Electoral district | Candidates | | | | | Incumbent |
| Electoral district | Conservative | Liberal | NDP | Green | Other | Incumbent |
|---|---|---|---|---|---|---|
| Bramalea—Gore—Malton | Stella Ambler; 18,353; 37.13% | Gurbax S. Malhi; 22,272; 45.06% | Jash Puniya; 5,945; 12.03% | Mark Pajot; 2,551; 5.16% | Frank Chilelli (M-L); 309; 0.63% | Gurbax Malhi |
| Brampton—Springdale | Parm Gill; 17,804; 39.33% | Ruby Dhalla; 18,577; 41.04% | Mani Singh; 5,238; 11.57% | Dave Finlay; 3,516; 7.77% | Dimitrios Kabitsis (Comm.); 135; 0.30% | Ruby Dhalla |
| Brampton West | Kyle Seeback; 21,515; 39.90% | Andrew Kania; 21,746; 40.33% | Jagtar Shergill; 7,334; 13.60% | Patti Chmelyk; 3,329; 6.17% | | Colleen Beaumier† |
| Mississauga— Brampton South | Salma Ataullahjan; 14,664; 32.96% | Navdeep Bains; 21,220; 47.69% | Karan Pandher; 5,268; 11.84% | Grace Yogaretnam; 2,947; 6.62% | Tim Sullivan (M-L); 395; 0.89% | Navdeep Bains |
| Mississauga East—Cooksville | Melissa Bhagat; 13,277; 32.56% | Albina Guarnieri; 20,457; 50.16% | Satish Balasunderam; 4,632; 11.36% | Jaymini Bhikha; 2,138; 5.24% | Pierre Chénier (M-L); 277; 0.68% | Albina Guarnieri |
| Mississauga—Erindale | Bob Dechert; 23,863; 42.71% | Omar Alghabra; 23,466; 42.00% | Mustafa Rizvi; 4,774; 8.55% | Richard Pietro; 3,636; 6.51% | Dagmar Sullivan (M-L); 129; 0.23% | Omar Alghabra |
| Mississauga South | Hugh Arrison; 18,366; 39.59% | Paul Szabo; 20,518; 44.22% | Matt Turner; 4,104; 8.85% | Richard Laushway; 3,407; 7.34% | | Paul Szabo |
| Mississauga—Streetsville | Wajid Khan; 16,985; 35.80% | Bonnie Crombie; 21,710; 45.76% | Keith Pinto; 4,710; 9.93% | Otto Casanova; 3,179; 6.70% | Ralph Bunag (Ind.); 426 0.90% | Wajid Khan |
| Mississauga—Streetsville | Wajid Khan; 16,985; 35.80% | Bonnie Crombie; 21,710; 45.76% | Keith Pinto; 4,710; 9.93% | Otto Casanova; 3,179; 6.70% | Viktor Spanovic (Ind.); 431 0.91% | Wajid Khan |
| Oakville | Terence Young; 26,011; 46.98% | M.A. Bonnie Brown; 20,528; 37.08% | Michelle Bilek; 4,143; 7.48% | Blake Poland; 4,681; 8.46% | | Bonnie Brown |

== 2006 ==
| Electoral district | Candidates | | | | | Incumbent |
| Electoral district | Liberal | Conservative | NDP | Green | Other | Incumbent |
|---|---|---|---|---|---|---|
| Bramalea—Gore—Malton | Gurbax S. Malhi; 25,348; 50.68% | John Sprovieri; 16,367; 32.73% | Cesar Martello; 6,343; 12.68% | Ernst Braendli; 1,721; 3.44% | Frank Chilelli (M-L); 233; 0.47% | Gurbax Malhi |
| Brampton—Springdale | Ruby Dhalla; 22,294; 47.34% | Sam Hundal; 14,492; 30.77% | Anna Mather; 8,345; 17.72% | Ian Raymond Chiocchio; 1,853; 3.93% | Upali Jinadasa Wannaku Rallage (Comm.); 110; 0.23% | Ruby Dhalla |
| Brampton West | Colleen Beaumier; 27,988; 49.12% | Bal Gosal; 20,345; 35.70% | Jagtar Singh Shergill; 6,310; 11.07% | Jaipaul Massey-Singh; 2,340; 4.11% | | Colleen Beaumier |
| Mississauga—Brampton South | Navdeep Bains; 27,370; 53.94% | Arnjeet Sangha; 15,605; 30.75% | Nirvan Balkissoon; 5,521; 10.88% | Grace Yogaretnam; 1,927; 3.80% | Tim Sullivan (M-L); 319; 0.63% | Navdeep Bains |
| Mississauga East—Cooksville | Albina Guarnieri; 23,530; 51.65% | Carl DeFaria; 14,326; 31.45% | Jim Gill; 5,180; 11.37% | Rich Pietro; 1,393; 3.06% | Pierre Chénier (M-L); 164 0.36% | Albina Guarnieri |
| Mississauga East—Cooksville | Albina Guarnieri; 23,530; 51.65% | Carl DeFaria; 14,326; 31.45% | Jim Gill; 5,180; 11.37% | Rich Pietro; 1,393; 3.06% | Mohamed Elrofaie (Ind.); 496 1.09% | Albina Guarnieri |
| Mississauga East—Cooksville | Albina Guarnieri; 23,530; 51.65% | Carl DeFaria; 14,326; 31.45% | Jim Gill; 5,180; 11.37% | Rich Pietro; 1,393; 3.06% | Sally Wong (CHP); 467 1.03% | Albina Guarnieri |
| Mississauga—Erindale | Omar Alghabra; 26,852; 44.81% | Bob Dechert; 23,524; 39.26% | Rupinder Brar; 6,644; 11.09% | Adam Hunter; 2,613; 4.36% | Ronnie Amyotte (Ind.); 289; 0.48% | Carolyn Parrish (Note: Elected as a Liberal in the 2004 Election, Carolyn Parrish was excluded from the Liberal caucus in November 2004.) |
| Mississauga South | Paul Szabo; 23,018; 44.17% | Phil Green; 20,888; 40.09% | Mark de Pelham; 5,607; 10.76% | Brendan Tarry; 2,393; 4.59% | Paul D.J. McMurray (CAP); 129 0.25% | Paul Szabo |
| Mississauga South | Paul Szabo; 23,018; 44.17% | Phil Green; 20,888; 40.09% | Mark de Pelham; 5,607; 10.76% | Brendan Tarry; 2,393; 4.59% | Dagmar Sullivan (M-L); 74 0.14% | Paul Szabo |
| Mississauga—Streetsville | Wajid Khan; 23,913; 45.95% | Raminder Gill; 18,121; 34.82% | James Caron; 6,929; 13.31% | Otto Casanova; 2,334; 4.48% | Peter Creighton (PC); 747; 1.44% | Wajid Khan |
| Oakville | M. A. Bonnie Brown; 25,892; 43.35% | Terence Young; 25,148; 42.10% | Tina Agrell; 5,815; 9.74% | Laura Domsy; 2,872; 4.81% | | Bonnie Brown |

== 2004 ==
| Parties | 1st | 2nd | 3rd | 4th |
|---|---|---|---|---|
| Liberal | 9 | 0 | 0 | 0 |
| Conservative | 0 | 9 | 0 | 0 |
| New Democratic | 0 | 0 | 9 | 0 |
| Green | 0 | 0 | 0 | 9 |

| Electoral district | Candidates | | | | | Incumbent |
| Electoral district | Liberal | Conservative | NDP | Green | Other | Incumbent |
|---|---|---|---|---|---|---|
| Bramalea—Gore—Malton | Gurbax S. Malhi; 20,394; 49.54% | Raminder Gill; 12,594; 30.59% | Fernando Miranda; 6,113; 14.85% | Sharleen McDowall; 1,832; 4.45% | Frank Chilelli (M-L); 237; 0.58% | Gurbax S. Malhi; Bramalea—Gore—Malton—Springdale |
| Brampton—Springdale | Ruby Dhalla^{@} 19,385; 47.73% | Sam Hundal^{1} 11,182; 27.53% | Kathy Pounder; 8,038; 19.79% | Nick Hudson; 1,927; 4.74% | Gurdev Singh Mattu (Comm.); 86; 0.21% | Sarkis Assadourian†; Brampton Centre |
| Brampton West | Colleen Beaumier; 21,254; 45.30% | Tony Clement; 18,768; 40.00% | Chris Moise; 4,920; 10.49% | Sanjeev Goel; 1,603; 3.42% | Tom Bose (Ind.); 371; 0.79% | Colleen Beaumier; Brampton West—Mississauga |
| Mississauga—Brampton South | Navdeep Bains; 24,753; 57.16% | Parvinder Sandhu; 10,433; 24.09% | Larry Taylor; 6,411; 14.80% | Paul Simas; 1,525; 3.52% | David Gershuny (M-L); 185; 0.43% | New district |
| Mississauga East—Cooksville | Albina Guarnieri; 22,435; 56.70% | Riina DeFaria; 10,299; 26.03% | Jim Gill; 4,619; 11.67% | Jason Robert Hinchliffe; 1,167; 2.95% | Pierre Chénier (M-L); 154 0.39% | Albina Guarnieri; Mississauga East |
| Mississauga East—Cooksville | Albina Guarnieri; 22,435; 56.70% | Riina DeFaria; 10,299; 26.03% | Jim Gill; 4,619; 11.67% | Jason Robert Hinchliffe; 1,167; 2.95% | Andrew Seitz (Ind.); 114 0.29% | Albina Guarnieri; Mississauga East |
| Mississauga East—Cooksville | Albina Guarnieri; 22,435; 56.70% | Riina DeFaria; 10,299; 26.03% | Jim Gill; 4,619; 11.67% | Jason Robert Hinchliffe; 1,167; 2.95% | Sally Wong (CHP); 778 1.97% | Albina Guarnieri; Mississauga East |
| Mississauga—Erindale | Carolyn Parrish; 28,246; 54.37% | Bob Dechert; 16,600; 31.95% | Simon Black; 5,104; 9.82% | Jeff Brownridge; 1,855; 3.57% | David Greig (M-L); 145; 0.28% | Carolyn Parrish; Mississauga Centre |
| Mississauga—Erindale | Carolyn Parrish; 28,246; 54.37% | Bob Dechert; 16,600; 31.95% | Simon Black; 5,104; 9.82% | Jeff Brownridge; 1,855; 3.57% | David Greig (M-L); 145; 0.28% | merged district |
| Mississauga—Erindale | Carolyn Parrish; 28,246; 54.37% | Bob Dechert; 16,600; 31.95% | Simon Black; 5,104; 9.82% | Jeff Brownridge; 1,855; 3.57% | David Greig (M-L); 145; 0.28% | Steve Mahoney§ Mississauga West |
| Mississauga South | Paul John Mark Szabo; 24,628; 51.67% | Phil Green; 16,027; 33.62% | Michael James Culkin; 5,004; 10.50% | Neeraj Jain; 1,899; 3.98% | Dagmar Sullivan (M-L); 107; 0.22% | Paul Szabo |
| Mississauga—Streetsville | Wajid Khan; 22,768; 50.56% | Nina Tangri; 14,287; 31.73% | Manjinder Rai; 4,266; 9.47% | Otto Casanova; 2,415; 5.36% | Peter Gibson Creighton (PC); 1,293; 2.87% | New district |
| Oakville | M.A. Bonnie Brown; 28,729; 52.01% | Rick Byers; 19,524; 35.35% | Alison Myrden; 4,027; 7.29% | Tania Orton; 2,861; 5.18% | Zeshan Shahbaz (CAP); 95; 0.17% | Bonnie Brown |

=== Maps ===
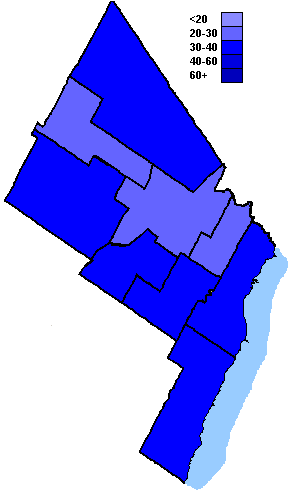
Conservative Party of Canada

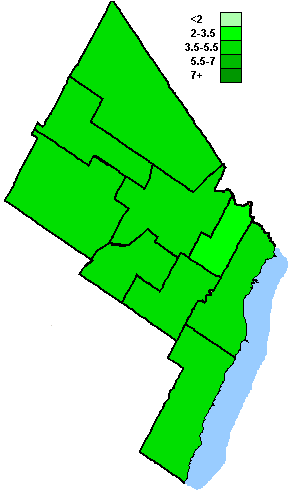
Green Party of Canada

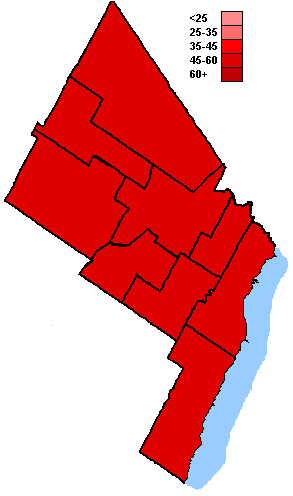
Liberal Party of Canada

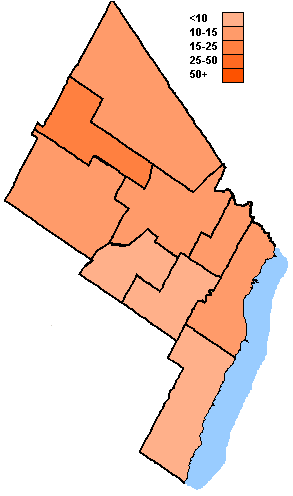
New Democratic Party

== 2000 ==
=== Party rankings ===
| Parties | 1st | 2nd | 3rd | 4th |
|---|---|---|---|---|
| Liberal | 8 | 0 | 0 | 0 |
| Alliance | 0 | 7 | 1 | 0 |
| Progressive Conservative | 0 | 1 | 7 | 0 |
| New Democratic | 0 | 0 | 0 | 8 |

| Electoral district | Candidates | | | | | Incumbent |
| Electoral district | Liberal | Canadian Alliance | NDP | PC | Other | Incumbent |
|---|---|---|---|---|---|---|
| Bramalea—Gore—Malton—Springdale | Gurbax Singh Malhi; 21,917 | Gurdish Mangat; 7,214 | Vishnu Roche; 1,864 | Danny Varaich; 6,019 | 1,402 | Gurbax Singh Malhi; Bramalea—Gore—Malton |
| Brampton Centre | Sarkis Assadourian; 18,365 | Prabhat Kapur; 6,247 | Sue Slean; 1,795 | Beryl Ford; 9,229 | 628 | Sarkis Assadourian |
| Brampton West—Mississauga | Colleen Beaumier; 31,041 | Hardial Sangha; 7,666 | Matt Harsant; 1,567 | W. Glenn Harewood; 5,957 | 529 | Colleen Beaumier |
| Mississauga Centre | Carolyn Parrish; 24,381 | Harry Dhaliwal; 6,643 | Gail Mccabe; 1,404 | Nina Tangri; 5,077 | 514 | Carolyn Parrish |
| Mississauga East | Albina Guarnieri; 22,158 | Jainstien Dookie; 5,372 | Henry Beer; 1,451 | Riina Defaria; 5,144 | 227 | Albina Guarnieri |
| Mississauga South | Paul Szabo; 20,676 | Brad Butt; 10,139 | Ken Cole; 1,636 | David Brown; 6,903 | 583 | Paul Szabo |
| Mississauga West | Steve Mahoney; 31,260 | Philip Leong; 10,582 | Cynthia Kazadi; 1,532 | Gul Nawaz; 5,275 | 810 | Steve Mahoney |
| Oakville | Bonnie Brown; 23,074 | Dan Ferrone; 13,544 | Willie Lambert; 1,335 | Rick Byers; 9,589 | 790 | Bonnie Brown |

== 1997 ==
=== Party rankings ===
| Parties | 1st | 2nd | 3rd | 4th |
|---|---|---|---|---|
| Liberal | 8 | 0 | 0 | 0 |
| Progressive Conservative | 0 | 6 | 2 | 0 |
| Reform | 0 | 2 | 6 | 0 |
| New Democratic | 0 | 0 | 0 | 8 |

| Electoral district | Candidates | | | | | Incumbent |
| Electoral district | Liberal | Reform | NDP | PC | Other | Incumbent |
|---|---|---|---|---|---|---|
| Bramalea—Gore—Malton | Gurbax Singh Malhi; 18,933 | Darlene Florence; 8,685 | Abdul Majeed; 2,281 | Beryl Ford; 10,655 | 279 | Gurbax Singh Malhi |
| Brampton Centre | Sarkis Assadourian; 18,615 | Don Crawford; 10,817 | Paul Ferreira; 2,923 | Sam S. Hundal; 5,621 | 127 | New district |
| Brampton West—Mississauga | Colleen Beaumier; 27,297 | Ernie Mcdonald; 7,569 | Nirmal Dhinsa; 2,192 | Kirk Robertson; 8,447 | | Colleen Beaumier; Brampton |
| Mississauga Centre | Carolyn Parrish; 25,881 | Janice Lim; 5,770 | Vishnu Roche; 1,900 | Ahmad Solomah; 6,049 | 192 | New district |
| Mississauga East | Albina Guarnieri; 23,780 | Peter Zathey; 5,617 | Terry Gorman; 2,156 | Michael Wojnarowicz; 7,852 | 262 | Albina Guarnieri |
| Mississauga South | Paul Szabo; 21,207 | Joe Peschisolido; 8,307 | Jessica Lott; 2,302 | Dick Barr; 10,077 | 569 | Paul Szabo |
| Mississauga West | Steve Mahoney; 30,598 | George Brant; 9,160 | Timothy Dean Speck; 2,128 | Rami Gill; 8,102 | | Carolyn Parrish (Note: Ran again in the newly created district of Mississauga Centre.) |
| Oakville | Bonnie Brown; 24,487 | Wayne Gray; 9,050 | Willie Lambert; 2,343 | Stephen Sparling; 15,473 | | Bonnie Brown; Oakville—Milton |
