= Liberal Party of Canada candidates in the 2015 Canadian federal election =

Candidates for the Liberal Party of Canada took part in all the 338 electoral districts in the 2015 Canadian federal election. 184 of them won their seat, giving Justin Trudeau's party an overall majority in the new House of Commons.

== Candidate statistics ==
Candidates Nominated	Male Candidates	Female Candidates	Most Common Occupation	
338	233	105	Lawyer	68

== Newfoundland and Labrador - 7 seats ==
Riding	Candidate's Name	Notes	Gender	Residence	Occupation	Votes	%	Rank
Avalon	Ken McDonald	Mayor of Conception Bay South	M	Conception Bay South	Small business owner	23,528	55.90%	1
Bonavista—Burin—Trinity	Judy Foote	Incumbent Member of Parliament	F	St. John's	Broadcast journalist, director of public relations	28,704	81.80%	1
Coast of Bays—Central—Notre Dame	Scott Simms	Incumbent Member of Parliament	M	Norris Arm	Broadcaster, Journalist	26,523	74.82%	1
Labrador	Yvonne Jones	Incumbent Member of Parliament	F	Mary's Harbour	Entrepreneur, Journalist	8,878	71.75%	1
Long Range Mountains	Gudie Hutchings		F	Corner Brook	Businesswoman	30,889	73.85%	1
St. John's East	Nick Whalen		M	St. John's	Lawyer	20,974	46.73%	1
St. John's South—Mount Pearl	Seamus O'Regan	Former CTV National News correspondent and former co-host of Canada AM	M	St. John's	Broadcaster	25,922	57.86%	1

== Prince Edward Island - 4 seats ==
Riding	Candidate's Name	Notes	Gender	Residence	Occupation	Votes	%	Rank
Cardigan	Lawrence MacAulay	Incumbent Member of Parliament	M	St. Peters Bay	Farmer	14,621	65.03%	1
Charlottetown	Sean Casey	Incumbent Member of Parliament	M	Charlottetown	Lawyer	11,910	56.27%	1
Egmont	Robert Morrissey	Former Member of the PEI Legislative Assembly for 1st Prince, then Tignish-DeBlois	M	Tignish	Businessman	10,521	49.25%	1
Malpeque	Wayne Easter	Incumbent Member of Parliament	M	North Wiltshire	Farmer	13,950	62.08%	1

== Nova Scotia - 11 seats ==
Riding	Candidate's Name	Notes	Gender	Residence	Occupation	Votes	%	Rank
Cape Breton—Canso	Rodger Cuzner	Incumbent Member of Parliament	M	Glace Bay	Event organizer	32,163	74.39%	1
Central Nova	Sean Fraser		M	New Glasgow	Lawyer	25,909	58.53%	1
Cumberland—Colchester	Bill Casey	Former Conservative Member of Parliament	M	Amherst	Businessman	29,527	63.73%	1
Dartmouth—Cole Harbour	Darren Fisher	Deputy Mayor of Halifax, Halifax City Councillor for District 6-Harbourview Burnside Dartmouth East	M	Dartmouth	Businessman	30,407	58.17%	1
Halifax	Andy Fillmore		M	Halifax	Architect	27,431	51.73%	1
Halifax West	Geoff Regan	Incumbent Member of Parliament	M	Bedford	Lawyer	34,377	68.65%	1
Kings—Hants	Scott Brison	Incumbent Member of Parliament	M	Cheverie	Investment banker	33,026	70.74%	1
Sackville—Preston—Chezzetcook	Darrell Samson	Superintendent of the Conseil Scolaire Acadien Provincial	M	Fall River	Educator	23,161	47.95%	1
South Shore—St. Margaret's	Bernadette Jordan	Development officer for the Health Services Foundation of the South Shore	F	West Dublin	Fundraiser	30,045	56.93%	1
Sydney—Victoria	Mark Eyking	Incumbent Member of Parliament	M	Big Bras d'Or	Farmer	29,995	73.20%	1
West Nova	Colin Fraser		M	Yarmouth	Lawyer	28,775	62.99%	1

== New Brunswick - 10 seats ==
Riding	Candidate's Name	Notes	Gender	Residence	Occupation	Votes	%	Rank
Acadie—Bathurst	Serge Cormier		M	Maisonnette	Policy analyst	25,845	50.71%	1
Beauséjour	Dominic LeBlanc	Incumbent Member of Parliament	M	Grande-Digue	Lawyer	36,534	69.02%	1
Fredericton	Matt DeCourcey		M	Fredericton	Youth advocate	23,016	49.26%	1
Fundy Royal	Alaina Lockhart		F	Sussex	Business owner	19,136	40.87%	1
Madawaska—Restigouche	René Arseneault		M	Balmora	Lawyer	20,778	55.70%	1
Miramichi—Grand Lake	Pat Finnigan	President of the Atlantic Association of CBDCs	M	Rogersville	Businessman	17,202	47.31%	1
Moncton—Riverview—Dieppe	Ginette Petitpas Taylor		F	Dieppe	Social worker	30,054	57.75%	1
New Brunswick Southwest	Karen Ludwig	Associate Dean of Yorkville University	F	Fredericton	Educator	16,656	43.92%	1
Saint John—Rothesay	Wayne Long	President of the Saint John Sea Dogs	M	Saint John	Hockey club president	20,634	48.80%	1
Tobique—Mactaquac	T. J. Harvey		M	Glassville	Businessman/farmer	17,909	46.61%	1

== Quebec - 78 seats ==
=== Eastern Quebec ===
Riding	Candidate's Name	Notes	Gender	Residence	Occupation	Votes	%	Rank	Ref.
Avignon—La Mitis—Matane—Matapédia	Rémi Massé	Director General of the CEGEP de Matane	M	Bas-Saint-Laurent	Public servant				
Bellechasse—Les Etchemins—Lévis	Jacques Turgeon		M	Lévis	Film producer				
Gaspésie—Les Îles-de-la-Madeleine	Diane Lebouthillier	Prefect of the Le Rocher-Percé Regional County Municipality	F	Sainte-Thérèse-de-Gaspé	Social worker				
Montmagny—L'Islet—Kamouraska—Rivière-du-Loup	Marie-Josée Normand		F	Saint-Hyacinthe	Financial security advisor				
Rimouski-Neigette—Témiscouata—Les Basques	Pierre Cadieux	2011 candidate in this riding	M	Rimouski	Professor				

=== Côte-Nord and Saguenay ===
Riding	Candidate's Name	Notes	Gender	Residence	Occupation	Votes	%	Rank	Ref.
Beauport—Côte-de-Beaupré—Île d'Orléans—Charlevoix	Jean-Roger Vigneau		M	Saint-Aimé-des-Lacs	Businessman				
Chicoutimi—Le Fjord	Denis Lemieux		M	Chicoutimi	Entrepreneur				
Jonquière	Marc Pettersen	2008 & 2011 candidate Chicoutimi—Le Fjord, municipal councilor for Chicoutimi-Nord Saguenay City Council	M	Chicoutimi	Graphic artist, regional development consultant				
Lac-Saint-Jean	Sabin Simard	1997 candidate in this riding for the Progressive Conservative Party	M	Alma	Industrial trainer				
Manicouagan	Mario Tremblay	Former mayor of Longue-Rive	M	Longue-Rive	Businessman				

=== Quebec City ===
Riding	Candidate's Name	Notes	Gender	Residence	Occupation	Votes	%	Rank	Ref.
Beauport—Limoilou	Antoine Bujold		M	Boischatel	Restaurateur				
Charlesbourg—Haute-Saint-Charles	Jean Côté		M	Charlesbourg	Consultant				
Louis-Hébert	Joël Lightbound		M	Quebec	Lawyer				
Louis-Saint-Laurent	Youri Rousseau		M	Quebec	Corporate services manager				
Québec	Jean-Yves Duclos		M	Quebec	Economist				

=== Central Quebec ===
Riding	Candidate's Name	Notes	Gender	Residence	Occupation	Votes	%	Rank	Ref.
Bécancour—Nicolet—Saurel	Claude Carpentier		M	Sorel-Tracy	Retired Sûreté du Québec officer				
Berthier—Maskinongé	Pierre Destrempes		M	Quebec	Realtor				
Joliette	Michel Bourgeois		M	Sainte-Marcelline-de-Kildare	Furniture store owner				
Lévis—Lotbinière	Claude Boucher	Former Canadian ambassador to Haiti	M	Saint-Antoine-de-Tilly	Diplomat				
Montcalm	Louis-Charles Thouin	Mayor of Saint-Calixte	M	Saint-Calixte	Politician				
Portneuf—Jacques-Cartier	David Gauvin		M	Deschambault-Grondines	Engineer				
Repentigny	Adriana Dudas		F	Repentigny	Restaurateur				
Saint-Maurice—Champlain	François-Philippe Champagne		M	Grand-Mère	Businessman				
Trois-Rivières	Yvon Boivin		M	Trois-Rivières	Public servant				

=== Eastern Townships ===
Riding	Candidate's Name	Notes	Gender	Residence	Occupation	Votes	%	Rank	Ref.
Beauce	Adam Veilleux		M	Saint-Benoît-Labre	Businessman				
Brome—Missisquoi	Denis Paradis	Former Member of Parliament(1995–2006)	M	Saint-Armand	Lawyer				
Compton—Stanstead	Marie-Claude Bibeau	Executive Director of the Sherbrooke Museum of Nature and Science	F	Rock Forest–Saint-Élie–Deauville	Businesswoman				
Drummond	Pierre Côté	2011 candidate in this riding, President of the Drummond Federal Liberal Association	M	Drummondville	Importer/exporter				
Mégantic—L'Érable	David Berthiaume		M	Thetford Mines	Chemist				
Richmond—Arthabaska	Marc Desmarais		M	Gatineau	Lobbyist				
Saint-Hyacinthe—Bagot	René Vincelette	2008 Conservative candidate in this riding	M	Mont-Saint-Hilaire	Senior executive				
Shefford	Pierre Breton	Granby City Councillor	M	Granby	Public servant				
Sherbrooke	Tom Allen	Former Lennoxville City Councillor, Chairman of the 2013 Canada Summer Games	M	Sherbrooke	Event organizer				

=== Montérégie ===
Riding	Candidate's Name	Notes	Gender	Residence	Occupation	Votes	%	Rank	Ref.
Beloeil—Chambly	Karine Desjardins		F	Otterburn Park	Property appraiser				
Brossard—Saint-Lambert	Alexandra Mendès	Former Member of Parliament	F	Brossard	Communications agent				
Châteauguay—Lacolle	Brenda Shanahan		F	Châteauguay	Investment advisor				
La Prairie	Jean-Claude Poissant	Saint-Philippe Municipal Councillor	M	Saint-Philippe	Farmer				
Longueuil—Charles-LeMoyne	Sherry Romanado		F	Greenfield Park	Lecturer				
Longueuil—Saint-Hubert	Mick O'Grady	Former city councillor and president of Greenfield Park Borough	M	Greenfield Park	Musician				
Montarville	Michel Picard	2011 candidate in Saint-Bruno—Saint-Hubert	M	Saint-Bruno	Author, consultant				
Pierre-Boucher—Les Patriotes—Verchères	Lucie Gagnon		F	Saint-Amable	Actress, singer				
Saint-Jean	Jean Rioux	Former Member of the Quebec National Assembly for Iberville	M	Saint-Jean-sur-Richelieu	Educator				
Salaberry—Suroît	Robert Sauvé	Former Mayor of Coteau-du-Lac	M	Coteau-du-Lac	Tire plant manager				
Vaudreuil—Soulanges	Peter Schiefke		M	Vaudreuil-sur-le-Lac	Humanitarian aid				

=== Eastern Montreal ===
Riding	Candidate's Name	Notes	Gender	Residence	Occupation	Votes	%	Rank	Ref.
Hochelaga	Marwah Rizqy		F	Montreal	Lawyer				
Honoré-Mercier	Pablo Rodríguez	Former Member of Parliament	M	Montreal	Communication consultant				
La Pointe-de-l'Île	Marie-Chantale Simard		F	Mercier-Est	Pharmaceuticals				
Laurier—Sainte-Marie	Christine Poirier		F	Montreal	Businesswoman				
Rosemont—La Petite-Patrie	Nadine Medawar		F	Montreal	Record producer, singer				

=== Western Montreal ===
Riding	Candidate's Name	Notes	Gender	Residence	Occupation	Votes	%	Rank	Ref.
Dorval—Lachine—LaSalle	Anju Dhillon		F	LaSalle	Lawyer				
Lac-Saint-Louis	Francis Scarpaleggia	Incumbent Member of Parliament	M	Kirkland	Financial analyst				
LaSalle—Émard—Verdun	David Lametti		M	Montreal	Professor of Law, McGill University				
Mount Royal	Anthony Housefather	Mayor of Côte-Saint-Luc	M	Côte-Saint-Luc	Lawyer				
Notre-Dame-de-Grâce—Westmount	Marc Garneau	Incumbent Member of Parliament, first Canadian astronaut in space	M	Westmount	Engineer				
Outremont	Rachel Bendayan		F	Montreal	Litigation lawyer				
Pierrefonds—Dollard	Frank Baylis		M	Beaconsfield	Medical thechnology				
Saint-Laurent	Stéphane Dion	Incumbent Member of Parliament; former Leader of the Liberal Party of Canada	M	Montreal	Political scientist				
Ville-Marie—Le Sud-Ouest—Île-des-Soeurs	Marc Miller		M	Westmount	Lawyer				

=== Northern Montreal and Laval ===
Riding	Candidate's Name	Notes	Gender	Residence	Occupation	Votes	%	Rank	Ref.
Ahuntsic-Cartierville	Mélanie Joly	2013 Montreal Mayoral Candidate	F	Montreal	Lawyer				
Alfred-Pellan	Angelo Iacono	2011 candidate in this riding	M	Montreal	Lawyer				
Bourassa	Emmanuel Dubourg	Incumbent Member of Parliament	M	Saint-Lambert	Accountant				
Laval—Les Îles	Fayçal El-Khoury	2013 Laval City Council candidate for Abord-à-Plouffe	M	Laval	Civil engineer				
Marc-Aurèle-Fortin	Yves Robillard		M	Laval	Teacher				
Papineau	Justin Trudeau	Incumbent Member of Parliament; Leader of the Liberal Party of Canada	M	Ottawa, Ontario	Teacher				
Saint-Léonard—Saint-Michel	Nicola Di Iorio		M	Montreal	Lawyer				
Vimy	Eva Nassif	2008 candidate in Terrebonne—Blainville and 2011 candidate in Laval	F	Laval	Translator, teacher				

=== Laurentides, Outaouais and Northern Quebec ===
Riding	Candidate's Name	Notes	Gender	Residence	Occupation	Votes	%	Rank	Ref.
Abitibi—Baie-James—Nunavik—Eeyou	Pierre Dufour	Director General of the Vallée-de-l'Or CLD	M	Val-d'Or	Public servant				
Abitibi—Témiscamingue	Claude Thibault		F	Rouyn-Noranda	International trade				
Argenteuil—La Petite-Nation	Stéphane Lauzon	Municipal councillor for Lac-Beauchamp district Gatineau City Council since 2009	M	Gatineau	Municipal councillor				
Gatineau	Steve MacKinnon	2011 candidate in this riding, former National Director of the Liberal Party of Canada, advisor to PM Paul Martin	M	Gatineau	Financial communications				
Hull—Aylmer	Greg Fergus	Former National Director of the Liberal Party of Canada, former president of the Young Liberals of Canada	M	Aylmer	Political party staff member				
Laurentides—Labelle	David Graham		M	Sainte-Lucie-des-Laurentides	Political assistant				
Mirabel	Karl Trudel		M	Saint-Joseph-du-Lac	Sales and marketing director				
Pontiac	Will Amos		M	Chelsea	Lawyer				
Rivière-des-Mille-Îles	Linda Lapointe	Former ADQ Member of the Quebec National Assembly for Groulx	F	Boisbriand	Businesswoman				
Rivière-du-Nord	Janice Bélair Rolland		F	Saint-Jérôme	Businesswoman				
Terrebonne	Michèle Audette	Former president Native Women's Association of Canada 2012-14	F	Maliotenam	Native rights campaigner				
Thérèse-De Blainville	Ramez Ayoub		M	Lorraine	Realtor				

== Ontario - 121 seats ==
Riding	Candidate's Name	Notes	Gender	Residence	Occupation	Votes	%	Rank
Ajax	Mark Holland	Former Member of Parliament for Ajax—Pickering, Director of Health Promotion and Public Affairs for the Heart and Stroke Foundation of Canada	M	Ajax	Health executive			
Algoma—Manitoulin—Kapuskasing	Heather Wilson		F	Espanola	Lodge owner			
Aurora—Oak Ridges—Richmond Hill	Leona Alleslev		F	Richmond Hill	Consultant, retired Canadian Air Force officer			
Barrie—Innisfil	Colin Wilson		M	Barrie	Public servant			
Barrie—Springwater—Oro-Medonte	Brian Tamblyn	Former president and CEO of Georgian College	M	Barrie	Retired			
Bay of Quinte	Neil Ellis	Former Mayor of Belleville	M	Belleville	Businessman			
Beaches—East York	Nathaniel Erskine-Smith		M	Toronto	Lawyer			
Brampton Centre	Ramesh Sangha		M	Brampton	Lawyer			
Brampton East	Raj Grewal		M	Brampton	Lawyer			
Brampton North	Ruby Sahota		F	Brampton	Lawyer			
Brampton South	Sonia Sidhu		F	Brampton	Diabetes Educator			
Brampton West	Kamal Khera		F	Brampton	Nurse			
Brantford—Brant	Danielle Takacs		F	Brantford	Community activist			
Bruce—Grey—Owen Sound	Kimberley Love	2011 candidate in this riding	F	Owen Sound	Communications			
Burlington	Karina Gould		F	Burlington	Trade and investment			
Cambridge	Bryan May	2011 candidate in this riding	M	Cambridge	General manager, YMCA			
Carleton	Chris Rodgers		M	Kars	Policy analyst			
Chatham-Kent—Leamington	Katie Omstead		F	Leamington	Teacher			
Davenport	Julie Dzerowicz		F	Toronto	Banking			
Don Valley East	Yasmin Ratansi	Former Member of Parliament	F	Toronto	Accountant			
Don Valley North	Geng Tan		M	Toronto	Chemist			
Don Valley West	Rob Oliphant	Former Member of Parliament	M	Toronto	Minister			
Dufferin—Caledon	Ed Crewson	Former Mayor of Shelburne	M	Shelburne	Insurance broker			
Durham	Corrina Traill	Clarington Councillor for Ward 3	F	Newcastle	Lawyer			
Eglinton—Lawrence	Marco Mendicino		M	Toronto	Lawyer			
Elgin—Middlesex—London	Lori Baldwin-Sands	St. Thomas Alderman, 2011 Ontario provincial candidate for the riding	F	St. Thomas	Politician			
Essex	Audrey Festeryga		F	Kingsville	Lawyer			
Etobicoke Centre	Borys Wrzesnewskyj	Former Member of Parliament	M	Mississauga	Businessman			
Etobicoke North	Kirsty Duncan	Incumbent Member of Parliament	F	Etobicoke	Medical geographer			
Etobicoke—Lakeshore	James Maloney	Former Toronto city councillor for ward 5 (Etobicoke—Lakeshore)	M	Etobicoke	Lawyer			
Flamborough—Glanbrook	Jennifer Stebbing		F	Burlington	Lawyer			
Glengarry—Prescott—Russell	Francis Drouin		M	Rockland	Consultant			
Guelph	Lloyd Longfield	Former president & CAO of the Guelph Chamber of Commerce	M	Guelph	Businessman			
Haldimand—Norfolk	Joan Mouland	Wife of former Member of Parliament Bob Speller	F	Waterford	Lawyer			
Haliburton—Kawartha Lakes—Brock	David Marquis	Former Brock Municipal and Regional Councillor, 1995 Ontario provincial candidate for Durham—York	M	Sunderland	Businessman			
Hamilton Centre	Anne Tennier	2011 candidate in this riding	F	Hamilton	Engineer			
Hamilton East—Stoney Creek	Bob Bratina	56th Mayor of Hamilton	M	Hamilton	Radio broadcaster			
Hamilton Mountain	Shaun Burt		M	Hamilton	Teacher			
Hamilton West—Ancaster—Dundas	Filomena Tassi	Former Catholic Trustee for Ward 3 of the Hamilton Wentworth Catholic School Board, 1995 Ontario provincial candidate for Hamilton Centre	F	Dundas	Chaplain			
Hastings—Lennox and Addington	Mike Bossio	Former Tyendinaga Township Councillor	M	Marysville	Consultant			
Humber River—Black Creek	Judy Sgro	Incumbent Member of Parliament for York West	F	Thornhill	Parliamentarian			
Huron—Bruce	Allan Thompson		M	Ottawa	Journalist			
Kanata—Carleton	Karen McCrimmon	2013 Liberal leadership candidate, 2011 candidate for Carleton—Mississippi Mills	F	Woodlawn	Mediator, retired Canadian Air Force Lt. Colonel			
Kenora	Bob Nault	Former Member of Parliament for Kenora—Rainy River (1988-2004)	M	Kenora	Consultant			
King—Vaughan	Deb Schulte	Vaughan local & regional Councillor	F	Vaughan	Engineer			
Kingston and the Islands	Mark Gerretsen	95th Mayor of Kingston, son of former Ontario cabinet minister and Member of Provincial Parliament John Gerretsen	M	Kingston	Politician			
Kitchener Centre	Raj Saini		M	Kitchener	Businessman			
Kitchener—Conestoga	Tim Louis		M	Kitchener	Musician			
Kitchener South—Hespeler	Marwan Tabbara		M	Kitchener	Quality control field supervisor			
Lambton—Kent—Middlesex	Ken Filson	Former Middlesex Centre councillor	M	Birr	Credit union employee			
Lanark—Frontenac—Kingston	Philippe Archambault		M	Inverary	Transportation			
Leeds—Grenville—Thousand Islands and Rideau Lakes	Mary Jean McFall	Former Brockville City Councillor	F	Brockville	Lawyer			
London—Fanshawe	Khalil Ramal	Former Member of the Ontario Legislative Assembly for this Riding	M	London	Businessman			
London North Centre	Peter Fragiskatos		M	London	Professor, King's University College (University of Western Ontario)			
London West	Kate Young	Former CFPL-TV news anchor, Manager of Public Affairs and Community Relations for the Thames Valley District School Board	F	London	Publicist			
Markham—Stouffville	Jane Philpott		F	Stouffville	Physician			
Markham—Thornhill	John McCallum	Incumbent Member of Parliament for Markham—Unionville	M	Oakville	Economist			
Markham—Unionville	Bang-Gu Jiang		F	Markham	Lawyer			
Milton	Azim Rizvee		M	Milton	Real estate CEO			
Mississauga Centre	Omar Alghabra	Former Member of Parliament for Mississauga—Erindale	M	Mississauga	Engineer			
Mississauga East—Cooksville	Peter Fonseca	Former Member of the Ontario Legislative Assembly for Mississauga East—Cooksville, former Ontario Minister of Labour, 2011 candidate in this riding	M	Mississauga	Management consultant			
Mississauga—Erin Mills	Iqra Khalid		F	Mississauga	Lawyer			
Mississauga—Lakeshore	Sven Spengemann	Former official with the United Nations Assistance Mission for Iraq	M	Mississauga	Lawyer			
Mississauga—Malton	Navdeep Bains	Former Member of Parliament for Mississauga—Brampton South	M	Mississauga	Professor			
Mississauga—Streetsville	Gagan Sikand		M	Mississauga	Lawyer			
Nepean	Chandra Arya		M	Nepean	Businessman and community activist			
Newmarket—Aurora	Kyle Peterson	2011 candidate in this riding, Director of the United Way of York Region	M	Newmarket	Lawyer			
Niagara Centre	Vance Badawey	2003 Ontario provincial candidate for Erie—Lincoln, former mayor of Port Colborne	M	Port Colborne	Businessman			
Niagara Falls	Ron Planche	Former Oakville Regional Councillor (1976-1981)	M	Niagara Falls	Marketing communications			
Niagara West	Phil Rose		M	Grimsby	Musician			
Nickel Belt	Marc Serré	Son of Former Member of Parliament Gaetan Serré	M	Val Caron	Businessman			
Nipissing—Timiskaming	Anthony Rota	Former Member of Parliament	M	North Bay	Lecturer			
Northumberland—Peterborough South	Kim Rudd	Former president of the Cobourg Chamber of Commerce, 2011 candidate for Northumberland—Quinte West	F	Cobourg	Businesswoman			
Oakville	John Oliver	Former president/CEO of Halton Healthcare Services	M	Oakville	Health management			
Oakville North—Burlington	Pam Damoff	Oakville Town Councillor for Ward 2	F	Oakville	Consultant			
Orléans	Andrew Leslie	Former Commander of the Canadian Army and Chief of the Army Staff (2006-2010)	M	Rockcliffe Park	Retired Canadian Armed Forces Lt. Gen			
Oshawa	Tito-Dante Marimpietri	Former Oshawa Regional & City Councillor	M	Oshawa	Government administration			
Ottawa Centre	Catherine McKenna		F	Ottawa	Lawyer			
Ottawa South	David McGuinty	Incumbent Member of Parliament, Brother of Former Ontario Premier Dalton McGuinty	M	Ottawa	Lawyer			
Ottawa—Vanier	Mauril Bélanger	Incumbent Member of Parliament	M	Rockcliffe Park	Administrator			
Ottawa West—Nepean	Anita Vandenbeld	2011 candidate in this riding	F	Ottawa	Consultant			
Oxford	Don McKay	Mayor of East Zorra-Tavistock since 2004	M	East Zorra-Tavistock	Politician			
Parkdale—High Park	Arif Virani		M	Toronto	Lawyer			
Parry Sound-Muskoka	Trisha Cowie		F	Muskoka Lakes	Lawyer			
Perth Wellington	Stephen McCotter	St. Mary's Municipal Councillor	M	St. Mary's	Lawyer			
Peterborough—Kawartha	Maryam Monsef		F	Peterborough	Community activist			
Pickering—Uxbridge	Jennifer O'Connell	Pickering Regional Councillor for Ward 1	F	Pickering	Legal assistant			
Renfrew—Nipissing—Pembroke	Jeff Lehoux		M	Renfrew	Humanitarian aid worker, retired Canadian Armed Forces Corporal			
Richmond Hill	Majid Jowhari		M	Richmond Hill	Businessman			
St. Catharines	Chris Bittle		M	St. Catharines	Lawyer			
Sarnia—Lambton	David McPhail		M	Sarnia	Retired school principal			
Sault Ste. Marie	Terry Sheehan	City Councillor for Ward 2 (2003–2015)	M	Sault Ste. Marie	Employment and training consultant			
Scarborough Centre	Salma Zahid		F	Scarborough	Public servant			
Scarborough North	Shaun Chen	Chair of the Toronto District School Board and School Trustee for Ward 21 (Scarborough—Rouge River)	M	Toronto	Community advocate			
Scarborough Southwest	Bill Blair	Former Chief of Toronto Police Service (2005-2015)	M	Toronto	Police officer			
Scarborough—Agincourt	Arnold Chan	Incumbent Member of Parliament	M	Scarborough	Lawyer			
Scarborough-Guildwood	John McKay	Incumbent Member of Parliament	M	Scarborough	Lawyer			
Scarborough—Rouge Park	Gary Anandasangaree		M	Markham	Lawyer			
Simcoe—Grey	Mike MacEachern	Former Mayor of New Tecumseth	M	Alliston	Politician			
Simcoe North	Elisabeth Riley	Former CEO of Orillia Soldiers’ Memorial Hospital	F	Orillia	Retired			
Spadina—Fort York	Adam Vaughan	Incumbent Member of Parliament for Trinity—Spadina	M	Toronto	Broadcast journalist			
Stormont—Dundas—South Glengarry	Bernadette Clement	2011 candidate in this riding	F	Cornwall	Lawyer			
Sudbury	Paul Lefebvre		M	Sudbury	Lawyer, businessman			
Thornhill	Nancy Coldham		F	Thornhill	Management consultant			
Thunder Bay—Rainy River	Don Rusnak		M	Thunder Bay	Lawyer			
Thunder Bay—Superior North	Patty Hajdu	Executive Director of Shelter House Thunder Bay	F	Thunder Bay	Public administrator			
Timmins-James Bay	Todd Lever	Former Timmins City Councillor	M	Timmins	Lawyer			
Toronto Centre	Bill Morneau	Former chairman of the C.D. Howe Institute	M	East York	Businessman			
Toronto—Danforth	Julie Dabrusin		F	Toronto	Lawyer			
Toronto—St. Paul's	Carolyn Bennett	Incumbent Member of Parliament for St. Paul's	F	Toronto	Physician			
University—Rosedale	Chrystia Freeland	Incumbent Member of Parliament for Toronto Centre	F	Toronto	Journalist			
Vaughan—Woodbridge	Francesco Sorbara		M	Woodbridge	Economist			
Waterloo	Bardish Chagger		F	Waterloo	Community organizer			
Wellington—Halton Hills	Don Trant	Former CEO of Georgetown Hospital	M	Halton Hills	Retired physician			
Whitby	Celina Caesar-Chavannes	2014 By-election candidate for Whitby—Oshawa	F	Whitby	Clinical trials management			
Willowdale	Ali Ehsassi		M	Toronto	Lawyer			
Windsor—Tecumseh	Frank Schiller		M	Windsor	Public servant			
Windsor West	David Sundin		M	Windsor	Lawyer			
York Centre	Michael Levitt		M	Toronto	Businessman			
York—Simcoe	Shaun Tanaka		F	Sharon	Geology professor			
York South—Weston	Ahmed Hussen	President of the Canadian Somali Congress	M	Vaughan	Lawyer			

== Manitoba - 14 Seats ==
Riding	Candidate's Name	Notes	Gender	Residence	Occupation	Votes	%	Rank
Brandon—Souris	Jodi Wyman		F	Alexander	Lawyer			
Charleswood—St. James—Assiniboia—Headingley	Doug Eyolfson		M	Winnipeg	Emergency room physician			
Churchill—Keewatinook Aski	Rebecca Chartrand		F	Winnipeg	Teacher			
Dauphin—Swan River—Neepawa	Ray Piché		M	Brandon	Retired Royal Canadian Mounted Police officer			
Elmwood—Transcona	Andrea Richardson-Lipon		F	Winnipeg	Audiologist			
Kildonan—St. Paul	MaryAnn Mihychuk	Former NDP Member of the Manitoba Legislative Assembly for St. James and Minto; 2004 Winnipeg mayoral candidate, former Manitoba Minister of Intergovernmental Affairs and Trade and former Manitoba Minister of Industry, Trade and Mines	F	Winnipeg	Geoscientist			
Portage—Lisgar	Ken Werbiski		M	Portage la Prairie	Optician, nurse			
Provencher	Terry Hayward	2013 By-election and 2011 candidate in this riding	M	Anola	Retired			
Saint Boniface—Saint Vital	Dan Vandal	Former Winnipeg City Councillor and Deputy Mayor of Winnipeg	M	Winnipeg	Social worker			
Selkirk—Interlake—Eastman	Joanne Levy	2000 candidate for Calgary Centre	F	Balmoral	Broadcast journalist			
Winnipeg Centre	Robert-Falcon Ouellette	2014 Winnipeg Mayoral Election candidate	M	Winnipeg	University of Manitoba Aboriginal Focus Program Director			
Winnipeg North	Kevin Lamoureux	Incumbent Member of Parliament	M	Winnipeg	Air traffic controller			
Winnipeg South	Terry Duguid	Former Winnipeg City Councillor, 2011 candidate in this riding, 2006 and 2004 candidate in Kildonan—St. Paul	M	Winnipeg	Community activist			
Winnipeg South Centre	Jim Carr	President and CEO of the Business Council of Manitoba; former Member of the Manitoba Legislative Assembly for Crescentwood and Fort Rouge	M	Winnipeg	Businessman			

== Saskatchewan - 14 seats ==
=== Southern Saskatchewan ===
Riding	Candidate's Name	Notes	Gender	Residence	Occupation	Votes	%	Rank	Ref.
Cypress Hills—Grasslands	Marvin Wiens	Former president Saskatchewan Wheat Pool 1999-2004	M	Wymark	Farmer				
Moose Jaw—Lake Centre—Lanigan	Perry Juttla	2014 Liberal Nomination candidate for Regina—Lewvan, 2003 Saskatchewan provincial candidate for Regina Walsh Acres	M	Regina	Entrepreneur/landlord				
Regina—Lewvan	Louis Browne	Former Regina City Councillor for Ward 1	M	Regina	Lawyer				
Regina—Qu'Appelle	Della Anaquod		F	Fort Qu'Appelle	Educator				
Regina—Wascana	Ralph Goodale	Incumbent Member of Parliament, Deputy Leader of the Liberal Party of Canada	M	Regina	Lawyer				
Souris—Moose Mountain	Steven Bebbington		M	Earl Grey	Health worker				
Yorkton—Melville	Brooke Malinoski		F	Saskatoon	Student				

=== Northern Saskatchewan ===
Riding	Candidate's Name	Notes	Gender	Residence	Occupation	Votes	%	Rank	Ref.
Battlefords—Lloydminster	Larry Ingram	Saskatchewan provincial candidate for Lloydminster 1999 & Cut Knife-Turtleford 2003	M	Turtleford	Farmer & sheet metal contractor				
Carlton Trail—Eagle Creek	Alex Slusar		M	Saskatoon	Political organiser				
Desnethé—Missinippi—Churchill River	Lawrence Joseph	2011 NDP candidate in this riding	M	Prince Albert	Consultant				
Prince Albert	Gordon Kirkby	Former MP for Prince Albert—Churchill River (1993–1997)	M	Prince Albert	Lawyer				
Saskatoon—Grasswood	Tracy Muggli	Director, Mental Health & Addiction Services for Saskatoon Health Region	F	Saskatoon	Public administrator				
Saskatoon—University	Cynthia Block		F	Saskatoon	Journalist				
Saskatoon West	Lisa Abbott		F	Saskatoon	Lawyer				

== Alberta - 34 seats ==
Riding	Candidate's Name	Notes	Gender	Residence	Occupation	Votes	%	Rank
Banff—Airdrie	Marlo Raynolds		M	Canmore	Engineer			
Battle River—Crowfoot	Andy Kowalski		M	Ryley	Businessman			
Bow River	Mac Alexander		M	Calgary	Student, oil driller			
Calgary Centre	Kent Hehr	Former Member of the Alberta Legislative Assembly for Calgary-Buffalo	M	Calgary	Lawyer			
Calgary Confederation	Matt Grant		M	Calgary	Lawyer			
Calgary Forest Lawn	Cam Stewart	2011 candidate for Calgary Northeast	M	Calgary	Retired police officer			
Calgary Heritage	Brendan Miles		M	Calgary	Physician			
Calgary Midnapore	Haley Brown		F	Calgary	Project manager			
Calgary Nose Hill	Robert Prcic	2012 Alberta provincial candidate Calgary-North West, 2014 provincial by-election candidate Calgary-Foothills	M	Calgary	Businessman			
Calgary Rocky Ridge	Nirmala Naidoo	Former news anchor for CICT-DT and CBRT-DT	F	Calgary	Marketing, broadcast journalist			
Calgary Shepard	Jerome James		M	Calgary	Mechanical engineer			
Calgary Signal Hill	Kerry Cundal		F	Calgary	Lawyer and Immigration adjudicator			
Calgary Skyview	Darshan Kang	Former Member of the Alberta Legislative Assembly for Calgary-McCall	M	Chestermere	Realtor			
Edmonton Centre	Randy Boissonnault		M	Edmonton	Entrepreneur			
Edmonton Griesbach	Brian Gold		M	Spruce Grove	Management consultant & lecturer			
Edmonton Manning	Sukhdev Aujla		M	Edmonton	Correctional officer			
Edmonton Mill Woods	Amarjeet Sohi	Edmonton City Councillor for Ward 12	M	Edmonton	Bus operator			
Edmonton Riverbend	Tariq Chaudary		M	Edmonton	Business manager, educator			
Edmonton Strathcona	Eleanor Olszewski		F	Edmonton	Lawyer, pharmacist			
Edmonton West	Karen Leibovici	Former Member of the Alberta Legislative Assembly for Edmonton-Meadowlark and Former Edmonton City Councillor for Ward 5	F	Edmonton	Social worker			
Edmonton—Wetaskiwin	Jacqueline Biollo	Former Councillor, Town of Beaumont	F	Beaumont	Businesswoman			
Foothills	Tanya MacPherson		F	Calgary	Real estate broker			
Fort McMurray—Cold Lake	Kyle Harrietha	2014 By-election candidate for Fort McMurray—Athabasca	M	Fort McMurray	Public servant			
Grande Prairie-Mackenzie	Reagan Johnston		M	Grand Prairie	Salesman			
Lakeland	Garry Parenteau		M	Fishing Lake	Public administrator, Metis rights campaigner			
Lethbridge	Mike Pyne	Former Member of the Taber Roman Catholic District School Board	M	Lethbridge	Public servant			
Medicine Hat—Cardston—Warner	Glen Allan		M	Medicine Hat	Professor			
Peace River—Westlock	Christopher Brown		M	Faust	Communications coordinator			
Red Deer—Lacombe	Jeff Rock		M	Red Deer	Clergyman			
Red Deer—Mountain View	Chandra Kastern		F	Red Deer	Administrator			
Sherwood Park—Fort Saskatchewan	Rod Frank		M	Sherwood Park	Lawyer			
St. Albert—Edmonton	Beatrice Ghettuba		F	Edmonton	Accountant, community organiser			
Sturgeon River—Parkland	Travis Dueck		M	Edmonton	Student			
Yellowhead	Ryan Maguhn	2014 By-election candidate for this riding, Hinton Municipal Councillor	M	Hinton	Teacher			

== British Columbia - 42 seats ==
=== BC Interior ===
Riding	Candidate's Name	Notes	Gender	Residence	Occupation	Votes	%	Rank	Ref.
Cariboo—Prince George	Tracy Calogheros		F	Prince George	Museum CEO				
Central Okanagan—Similkameen—Nicola	Karley Scott		F	West Kelowna	Lawyer				
Kamloops—Thompson—Cariboo	Steve Powrie		M	Kamloops	Teacher				
Kelowna—Lake Country	Stephen Fuhr		M	Kelowna	Pilot				
Kootenay—Columbia	Don Johnston	Former CEO of the Columbia Basin Trust and Canada World Youth	M	Nelson	Community development				
North Okanagan—Shuswap	Cindy Derkaz		F	Salmon Arm	Retired				
Prince George—Peace River—Northern Rockies	Matt Shaw		M	Prince George	Adult educator				
Skeena—Bulkley Valley	Brad Layton	Telkwa village councilor since 2011	M	Telkwa	Forest technician				
South Okanagan—West Kootenay	Connie Denesiuk	Former president of the B.C. School Trustees Association, former chair of the Okanagan Skaha School District Board	F	Summerland	Construction				

=== Fraser Valley and Southern Lower Mainland ===
Riding	Candidate's Name	Notes	Gender	Residence	Occupation	Votes	%	Rank	Ref.
Abbotsford	Peter Njenga		M	Surrey	Accountant				
Chilliwack—Hope	Louis De Jaeger		M	Chilliwack	Restaurateur				
Cloverdale—Langley City	John Aldag		M	Langley	Businessman				
Delta	Carla Qualtrough	President of the Canadian Paralympic Committee	F	Delta	Lawyer				
Fleetwood—Port Kells	Ken Hardie	Communications director of TransLink 1999–2012	M	Surrey	Communications director				
Langley—Aldergrove	Leon Jensen		M	Langley	Retired Canadian Armed Forces Lt. Colonel				
Mission—Matsqui—Fraser Canyon	Jati Sidhu	2000 candidate for Dewdney—Alouette	M	Abbotsford	Businessman				
Pitt Meadows—Maple Ridge	Dan Ruimy		M	Maple Ridge	Businessman				
Richmond Centre	Lawrence Woo		M	Vancouver	Accountant				
South Surrey—White Rock	Judy Higginbotham	1988 candidate in South Surrey—White Rock—South Langley, 2004 & 2008 candidate in South Surrey—White Rock—Cloverdale, Member of Surrey City Council 1983-2008	F	South Surrey	Businesswoman, community organiser				
Steveston—Richmond East	Joe Peschisolido	Former MP for Richmond representing the Canadian Alliance (2000–02) & the Liberals (2002-04)	M	Richmond	Lawyer				
Surrey Centre	Randeep Sarai		M	Surrey	Lawyer				
Surrey—Newton	Sukh Dhaliwal	Former Member of Parliament for Newton—North Delta	M	Surrey	Engineer				

=== Vancouver and Northern Lower Mainland ===
Riding	Candidate's Name	Notes	Gender	Residence	Occupation	Votes	%	Rank	Ref.
Burnaby North—Seymour	Terry Beech	Former Nanaimo City Councillor	M	Burnaby	Educator	18,938	36.09	1	
Burnaby South	Adam Pankratz		M	Burnaby	Banker	15,547	33.88	2	
Coquitlam—Port Coquitlam	Ron McKinnon	2008 candidate in Port Moody—Westwood—Port Coquitlam	M	Port Coquitlam	IT consultant	19,938	35.28	1	
New Westminster—Burnaby	Sasha Ramnarine		M	New Westminster	Lawyer	15,253	28.97	2	
North Vancouver	Jonathan Wilkinson		M	North Vancouver	Businessman	36,458	56.65	1	
Port Moody—Coquitlam	Jessie Adcock	Chief Digital Officer for Vancouver	F	Port Moody	Public servant	16,888	30.89	2	
Vancouver Centre	Hedy Fry	Incumbent Member of Parliament	F	Vancouver	Doctor	32,554	56.08	1	
Vancouver East	Edward Wong		M	Vancouver	Lawyer	16,532	28.16	2	
Vancouver Granville	Jody Wilson-Raybould	Regional Chief of the BC Assembly of First Nations	F	Quathiaski Cove	Lawyer	23,643	43.94	1	
Vancouver Kingsway	Steven Kou		M	Vancouver	Wealth management	12,625	27.81	2	
Vancouver Quadra	Joyce Murray	Incumbent Member of Parliament	F	Vancouver	Environmentalist	31,102	58.71	1	
Vancouver South	Harjit Sajjan	Former Commander of The British Columbia Regiment (Duke of Connaught's Own), first Sikh to command a Canadian regiment.	M	Vancouver	Canadian Armed Forces, Lt. Col	21,773	48.81	1	
West Vancouver—Sunshine Coast—Sea to Sky Country	Pamela Goldsmith-Jones	Former Mayor of West Vancouver	F	West Vancouver	Public affairs consultant	36,300	54.62	1	

=== Vancouver Island ===
Riding	Candidate's Name	Notes	Gender	Residence	Occupation	Votes	%	Rank	Ref.
Courtenay—Alberni	Carrie Powell-Davidson	Parksville City Councillor	F	Parksville	Event planner	15,212	21.78	3	
Cowichan—Malahat—Langford	Luke Krayenhoff		M	Victoria	Management consultant	14,685	23.77	2	
Esquimalt—Saanich—Sooke	David Merner	Former president of the Liberal Party of Canada (British Columbia)	M	Victoria	Lawyer	18,622	27.35	2	
Nanaimo—Ladysmith	Tim Tessier		M	Nanaimo	Realtor	16,753	23.52	2	
North Island—Powell River	Peter Schwarzhoff		M	Campbell River	Meteorologist	15,416	25.47	3	
Saanich—Gulf Islands	Tim Kane		M	Victoria	Public relations	11,380	16.70	3	
Victoria	Cheryl Thomas (candidate resigned after nomination deadline)		F			8,489	11.81	3	

== Yukon - 1 seat ==
Riding	Candidate's Name	Notes	Gender	Residence	Occupation	Votes	%	Rank	Ref.
Yukon	Larry Bagnell	Former Member of Parliament	M	Whitehorse	Executive director	10,887	53.65	1	

== Northwest Territories - 1 seat ==
Riding	Candidate's Name	Notes	Gender	Residence	Occupation	Votes	%	Rank	Ref.
Northwest Territories	Michael McLeod	Former North West Territories MLA for Deh Cho (1999-2011)	M	Fort Providence	Tourism development officer	9,172	48.34	1	

== Nunavut - 1 seat ==
Riding	Candidate's Name	Notes	Gender	Residence	Occupation	Votes	%	Rank	Ref.
Nunavut	Hunter Tootoo	1997 NDP candidate for Nunavut. Former Nunavut MLA (1999–2013) and former Speaker (2011–13)	M	Iqaluit	Businessman	10,887	53.65	1	

== See also ==
- Results of the Canadian federal election, 2011
- Results by riding for the Canadian federal election, 2011
