= Douglas Glenn Fisher =

Canadian politician (born 1942)

Douglas Fisher

Member of Parliament for Mississauga North
- In office 1980–1984
- Preceded by: Alex Jupp
- Succeeded by: Robert Horner

Personal details
- Born: Douglas Glenn Fisher; 28 November 1942 (age 83) Windsor, Ontario, Canada
- Party: Liberal
- Profession: business

Douglas Glenn Fisher (born 28 November 1942) is a Canadian politician. The son of Mary Waddington Fisher and Clancy Clare Fisher. Fisher graduated with a Bachelor of Arts degree from Assumption University of Windsor in 1963. In 1986, he organized the Clancy Fisher Award for Windsor students entering the University of Windsor. He was married to Christine Purden from 1970 to 1975. In 1978, he married Barbara Jacob. The two later divorced. In 2012, he married Irene DeClute.

He was a Liberal Party member of the House of Commons of Canada from Mississauga North from 1980 to 1984. He was defeated in the 1984 general election by Progressive Conservative Robert Horner. He ran unsuccessfully against Horner again in 1988.

In the House of Commons, he served as the Parliamentary Secretary to the Minister of Finance from 1982 to 1984. He chaired the Metropolitan Toronto Liberal parliamentary caucus from 1982 to 1984. He was the Canadian Delegate to the Caribbean Development Bank in 1982 and 1983 and he chaired the Subcommittee on Taxation of Artists and Writers in 1984.

From 1975 to 2005, Fisher owned and operated Cross Canada Books, a distribution company that sold Canadian books to schools and libraries. Along with geographer John Koegler, he published two books - Canada's Changing Landscape and Canada's Modern Landscape.

In 2005, he became the manager of the Cabbagetown Business Improvement Area and from 2013 to 2016, he managed the Yonge Bloor Bay Association in Toronto's Yorkville neighbourhood. He has authored two successful online blogs - the award-winning Cabbagetown News (2007 to 2012) and the Cabbagetown Neighbourhood Review (from 2012).
