= Robert Horner (politician) =

Canadian politician (1932–2008)

Member of Parliament for Mississauga North
- In office September 4th 1984 – October 1st 1988
- Preceded by: Douglas Glenn Fisher
- Succeeded by: riding dissolved

Member of Parliament for Mississauga West
- In office November 21st 1988 – September 9th 1993
- Preceded by: riding created
- Succeeded by: Carolyn Parrish

Personal details
- Born: Robert Nesbitt Horner; 3 July 1932 Shawville, Quebec, Canada
- Died: 27 June 2008 (aged 75) Mississauga, Ontario, Canada
- Party: Progressive Conservative
- Profession: police officer, veterinarian

Robert Nesbitt Horner (3 July 1932 – 27 June 2008), a native of Shawville, Quebec, was a member of the House of Commons of Canada from 1984 to 1993. A graduate of the University of Guelph in 1964, Horner worked for 25 years in Mississauga as a veterinarian. He also served with the Royal Canadian Mounted Police (RCMP) and was a member of the RCMP Veteran's Association.

He was elected in the 1984 federal election at the Mississauga North electoral district for the Progressive Conservative party. He served in the 33rd Canadian Parliament and was re-elected in the 1988 federal election to serve in the 34th Canadian Parliament under the revised boundaries of the Mississauga West electoral district. Horner chaired the House of Commons Standing Committee on Justice and the Solicitor General in 1989 and again in 1991.

He was defeated by Carolyn Parrish of the Liberal Party in the 1993 federal election. Horner died in Mississauga at Credit Valley Hospital, aged 75.
