= Mississauga North (federal electoral district) =

Former federal electoral district in Ontario, Canada

Ontario electoral district

Defunct federal electoral district
- Legislature: House of Commons
- District created: 1976
- District abolished: 1987
- First contested: 1979
- Last contested: 1984

Mississauga North /ˌmɪsɪˈsɔːɡə/ was a federal electoral district in Ontario, Canada, that was represented in the House of Commons of Canada from 1979 to 1988.

This riding was created in 1976 from parts of Halton and Mississauga ridings.

It consisted of the part of the City of Mississauga, Ontario, lying north of a line drawn (from west to east) along Highway No. 5, Cawthra Road, and the Queen Elizabeth Way.

The electoral district was abolished in 1987 when it was redistributed between Mississauga East, Mississauga West and Mississauga South ridings.

== Members of Parliament ==
The riding elected the following members of Parliament:

Parliament	Years	Member	Party
Riding created from Halton and Mississauga
31st	1979–1980	Alex Jupp	Progressive Conservative
32nd	1980–1984	Douglas Glenn Fisher	Liberal
33rd	1984–1988	Robert Horner	Progressive Conservative
Riding dissolved into Mississauga East, Mississauga West and Mississauga South

== Electoral history ==
1979 Canadian federal election
Party	Candidate	Votes
Progressive Conservative	Alex Jupp	30,531
Liberal	Tony Abbott	26,881
New Democratic	John McGuigan	11,002
Libertarian	Martin Wahl	277
Marxist–Leninist	Bill Shpikula	64

1980 Canadian federal election
Party	Candidate	Votes
Liberal	Douglas Glenn Fisher	30,531
Progressive Conservative	Alex Jupp	25,739
New Democratic	W. George Ross	11,729
Libertarian	Kenneth Wilcox	306
Marxist–Leninist	Bill Shpikula	74

1984 Canadian federal election
Party	Candidate	Votes
Progressive Conservative	Robert Horner	47,124
Liberal	Douglas Glenn Fisher	33,203
New Democratic	Bill Patrick	13,823
Green	Ronald W. Pate	609
Libertarian	Karl von Harten	435

== See also ==
- List of Canadian electoral districts
- Historical federal electoral districts of Canada
