= Alex Jupp =

Canadian politician (1927–2018)

Member of the Canadian Parliament for Mississauga North
- In office 1979–1980
- Preceded by: District was created in 1976
- Succeeded by: Douglas Glenn Fisher

Personal details
- Born: George Alexander Jupp; 30 May 1927 Arcola, Saskatchewan, Canada
- Died: 23 November 2018 (aged 91) Toronto, Ontario, Canada
- Party: Progressive Conservative

George Alexander Jupp (30 May 1927 – 23 November 2018) was a Canadian teacher, businessman and politician. Jupp was a Progressive Conservative party member of the House of Commons of Canada.

He represented Ontario's Mississauga North electoral district which he won in the 1979 federal election. After serving his only term, the 31st Canadian Parliament, he was defeated in the 1980 federal election by Douglas Fisher of the Liberal party. He died at Sunnybrook Health Sciences Centre in Toronto in November 2018 at the age of 91.
