= Fares Al Soud =

Canadian politician (born 2000)

Fares Al Soud MP
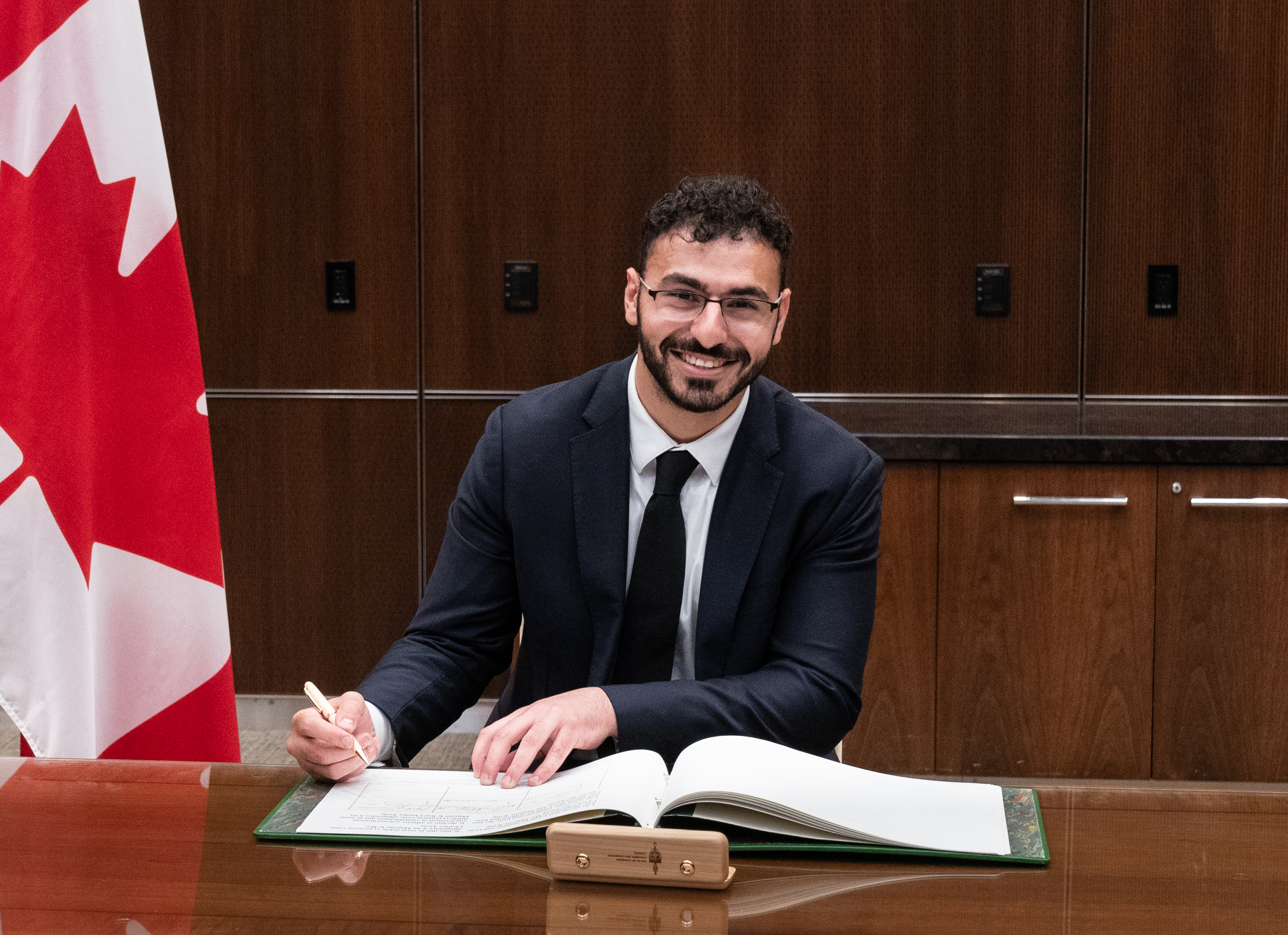
- Al Soud's Swearing-in Ceremony

Member of Parliament for Mississauga Centre
- Incumbent
- Assumed office April 28, 2025
- Preceded by: Omar Alghabra

Personal details
- Born: 2000 (age 25–26) Montreal, Quebec, Canada
- Party: Liberal
- Education: University of Toronto (BSc)
- Website: faresalsoud.libparl.ca

Fares Abu Al Soud (born 2000) is a Canadian politician who has served as the member of Parliament (MP) for Mississauga Centre since 2025. He is a member of the Liberal Party of Canada.

== Background ==
Al Soud was born in 2000 in Montreal, Quebec. In 2023, he graduated with a Bachelor of Science from the Mississauga campus of the University of Toronto.

While completing his studies, Al Soud worked in the office of former MP and cabinet minister Omar Alghabra. He later joined the Prime Minister's Office and subsequently became a policy advisor to Diane Lebouthillier, Minister of Fisheries and Oceans Canada, where he later served as interim director of policy.

At the time of the 2025 Canadian federal election, he lived in Ottawa.

== Political career ==
In early 2025, Al Soud was acclaimed as the Liberal candidate for the riding of Mississauga Centre ahead of the 2025 Canadian federal election. He won election on April 28, 2025. Alongside Tatiana Auguste, Amandeep Sodhi, and Jake Sawatzky, Al Soud is one of the first four Canadian MPs born in the 21st century.

== Electoral record ==
2025 Canadian federal election: Mississauga Centre
Party	Candidate	Votes	%	±%	Expenditures
Liberal	Fares Al Soud	29,605	53.85	–0.03	$124,813.56
Conservative	Muhammad Ishaq	23,010	41.85	+13.00	$128.847.05
New Democratic	Brandon Nguyen	1,502	2.73	–8.59	$0.00
People's	Gurdeep Wolosz	602	1.10	–3.09	$5,994.13
Independent	Zulfiqar Ali	257	0.47	N/A	$846.19
Total valid votes/expense limit		56,430	99.20	–	$133,481.46
Total rejected ballots		454	0.80		
Turnout		56,884	64.91		
Eligible voters		87,629			
Liberal notional hold		Swing		–6.52	
Source: Elections Canada
