= Bob Dechert =

Canadian politician (born 1958)

Robert Dechert
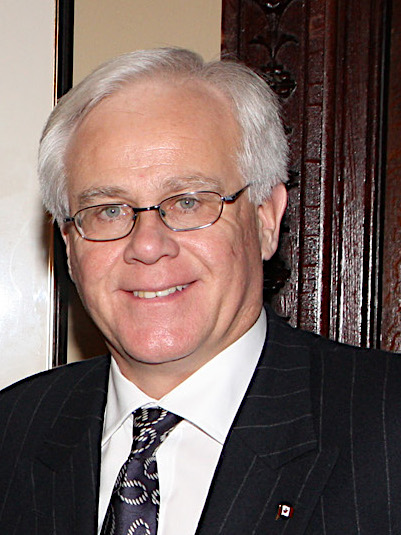
- Dechert in 2012

Member of Parliament for Mississauga—Erindale
- In office October 14, 2008 – August 4, 2015
- Preceded by: Omar Alghabra
- Succeeded by: Riding abolished

Personal details
- Born: May 18, 1958 (age 68) Brampton, Ontario, Canada
- Party: Conservative
- Spouse: Ruth Clark
- Profession: Lawyer

Robert "Bob" Dechert (born May 18, 1958) is a former Canadian politician and lawyer. A member of the Conservative Party of Canada, Dechert served as the member of Parliament for the riding of Mississauga—Erindale in the House of Commons of Canada from 2008 to 2015.

== Background ==
Dechert was born in Brampton, Ontario and graduated from McMaster University in Hamilton with a Bachelor of Arts in economics. He attended law school at the University of Toronto and was called to the bar in Ontario in 1985. He joined the law firm of Gowling Lafleur Henderson LLP where he practiced corporate law and was a senior partner.

== Politics ==
Dechert became involved in politics in his teen years, putting up signs for Progressive Conservative Party of Canada (PC) candidate Duncan Beattie in the 1972 federal election, and assisting in the campaign of the Ontario PCs in the 1975 provincial election.

The PCs suffered a historic defeat in the 1993 federal election, winning only two seats in the House of Commons. In its aftermath, Dechert came together with a group of provincial conservatives, primarily from Ontario, to form the "Blue Committee" in 1994. The group desired a more conservative PC Party and wanted to work together with the Reform Party of Canada, which won 52 seats in that election. The Blue Committee was instrumental in the creation of the United Alternative movement, the Canadian Alliance and ultimately, the merger of the Alliance and the PCs to form the modern Conservative Party of Canada.

Dechert ran in the 2004 federal election in the riding of Mississauga—Erindale, losing to Carolyn Parrish. He ran in the same riding in the 2006 federal election, losing to Omar Alghabra. He defeated Alghabra in the 2008 federal election to become the Member of Parliament for that riding, and was appointed Parliamentary Secretary to the Minister of Justice on March 5, 2010. In the 2011 federal election, Dechert once again defeated Alghabra to return to the House of Commons, and was named Parliamentary Secretary to the Minister of Foreign Affairs John Baird.

On September 9, 2011, it was revealed that Dechert had been engaging in "flirtatious e-mails" with a correspondent, Shi Rong, working for the People's Republic of China news agency, Xinhua. The e-mails came to light when the correspondent's husband hacked into her e-mail account and made them public. Dechert acknowledged the "flirtatious" nature of his relationship and issued an apology, but denied any wrongdoing. Critics, including Charles Burton, a former Canadian diplomat to Beijing, raised concerns as to whether Shi Rong was a Chinese spy trying to gain access to sensitive government information. Both Burton and the opposition asserted that Dechert must have known about Xinhua's espionage activities.

Despite the controversy, Dechert stayed on as Parliamentary Secretary to the Foreign Affairs Minister, then returned to his previous role as Parliamentary Secretary to the Justice Minister in September 2013.

Dechert contested the newly established riding of Mississauga—Erin Mills in the 2015 federal election, losing to Liberal candidate Iqra Khalid. He then sought to represent the Ontario PCs in the riding of Mississauga—Erin Mills in the 2018 provincial election, but withdrew from the nomination process in January 2017, citing concerns over the sale of new party memberships.
