= Mississauga Centre (federal electoral district) =

Federal electoral district in Ontario, Canada

Coordinates: 43.586°N 79.661°W

Ontario electoral district
- Interactive map of riding boundaries from the 2025 federal election

Federal electoral district
- Legislature: House of Commons
MP
Fares Al Soud
Liberal
- District created: 1996
- First contested: 1997
- Last contested: 2021
- District webpage: profile, map

Demographics
- Population (2011): 118,756
- Electors (2015): 81,920
- Area (km²): 24
- Pop. density (per km²): 4,948.2
- Census division: Peel
- Census subdivision: Mississauga

Mississauga Centre (French: Mississauga-Centre) is a federal electoral district in the Peel Region of Ontario, Canada, that has been represented in the House of Commons of Canada from 1997 to 2004 and since 2015.

== Geography ==
The riding contains the neighbourhoods of Creditview, Mavis-Erindale, Mississauga City Centre, and parts of Fairview, Mississauga Valleys, Rathwood, Erindale, East Credit, Brittania and Hurontario.

== History ==
This riding was first created in 1996 from parts of Mississauga South, Mississauga East and Mississauga West ridings. Throughout its initial existence, it was represented in the House of Commons by Carolyn Parrish. It consisted of the central part of the City of Mississauga.

The electoral district was abolished in 2003 when it was redistributed between Mississauga East—Cooksville, Mississauga South, Mississauga—Brampton South and Mississauga—Erindale ridings.

The riding was reinstated with the 2012 redistribution from parts of Mississauga East—Cooksville, Mississauga—Erindale, Mississauga—Brampton South, and Mississauga—Streetsville.

== Demographics ==
According to the 2021 Canadian census

Ethnic groups: 30.2% South Asian, 25.0% White, 11.2% Chinese, 8.7% Arab, 6.3% Black, 6.1% Filipino, 2.9% Southeast Asian, 2.8% Latin American, 1.4% West Asian, 1.0% Korean
Languages: 35.8% English, 7.1% Arabic, 5.7% Urdu, 5.0% Mandarin, 3.5% Cantonese, 3.0% Tagalog, 2.6% Hindi, 2.4% Spanish, 2.3% Punjabi, 2.2% Polish, 2.1% Portuguese, 1.8% Tamil, 1.7% Vietnamese, 1.2% Gujarati, 1.1% Italian
Religions: 42.7% Christian (26.4% Catholic, 3.3% Christian Orthodox, 1.2% Anglican, 11.8% Other), 21.2% Muslim, 12.2% Hindu, 2.5% Buddhist, 2.5% Sikh, 18.1% No religion
Median income: $36,400 (2020)
Average income: $47,680 (2020)

== Members of Parliament ==
The riding has elected the following members of Parliament:

Parliament	Years	Member	Party
Mississauga Centre; Riding created from Mississauga East and Mississauga West
36th	1997–2000	Carolyn Parrish	Liberal
37th	2000–2004	Carolyn Parrish	Liberal
Riding dissolved into Mississauga East—Cooksville, Mississauga South, Mississauga—Brampton South and Mississauga—Erindale
Riding re-created from Mississauga East—Cooksville, Mississauga—Erindale, Mississauga—Brampton South and Mississauga—Streetsville
42nd	2015–2019	Omar Alghabra	Liberal
43rd	2019–2021	Omar Alghabra	Liberal
44th	2021–2025	Omar Alghabra	Liberal
45th	2025–present	Fares Al Soud	Liberal

== Election results ==
=== 2015–present ===
View source data.
Graph of election results in Mississauga Centre (since 2011 (redistributed), minor parties that never got 2% of the vote or didn't run consistently are omitted)

2025 Canadian federal election
Party	Candidate	Votes	%	±%	Expenditures
Liberal	Fares Al Soud	29,605	53.85	–0.03	$124,813.56
Conservative	Muhammad Ishaq	23,010	41.85	+13.00	$128.847.05
New Democratic	Brandon Nguyen	1,502	2.73	–8.59	$0.00
People's	Gurdeep Wolosz	602	1.10	–3.09	$5,994.13
Independent	Zulfiqar Ali	257	0.47	N/A	$846.19
Total valid votes/expense limit		56,430	99.20	–	$133,481.46
Total rejected ballots		454	0.80		
Turnout		56,884	64.91		
Eligible voters		87,629			
Liberal notional hold		Swing		–6.52	
Source: Elections Canada

2021 federal election redistributed results
Party	Vote	%
Liberal	24,922	53.88
Conservative	13,345	28.85
New Democratic	5,234	11.32
People's	1,939	4.19
Green	750	1.62
Others	61	0.13

2021 Canadian federal election
Party	Candidate	Votes	%	±%	Expenditures
Liberal	Omar Alghabra	25,714	54.22	–1.54	$87,597.31
Conservative	Kathy-Ying Zhao	13,390	28.23	–1.30	$20,654.68
New Democratic	Teneshia Samuel	5,330	11.24	+1.62	$1,676.87
People's	Elie Diab	2,148	4.53	+2.97	$1,711.39
Green	Craig Laferriere	864	1.82	–1.24	$65.47
Total valid votes/expense limit		47,431	–	–	$114,459.86
Total rejected ballots		462	0.96		
Turnout		47,893	56.32		
Eligible voters		85,044			
Liberal hold		Swing		–1.54	
Source: Elections Canada

2019 Canadian federal election
Party	Candidate	Votes	%	±%	Expenditures
Liberal	Omar Alghabra	29,974	55.76	+1.04	$93,154.83
Conservative	Milad Mikael	15,874	29.53	-4.09	none listed
New Democratic	Sarah Walji	5,173	9.62	+0.13	none listed
Green	Hugo Reinoso	1,646	3.06	+0.88	$0.00
People's	David Micalef	837	1.56	–	$1,997.84
Independent	Greg Vezina	252	0.47	–	$1,248.05
Total valid votes/expense limit		53,756	100.0		
Total rejected ballots		475			
Turnout		54,231	62.3		
Eligible voters		87,047			
Liberal hold		Swing		+2.57	
Source: Elections Canada

2015 Canadian federal election
Party	Candidate	Votes	%	±%	Expenditures
Liberal	Omar Alghabra	28,372	54.72	+18.00	$91,229.39
Conservative	Julius Tiangson	17,431	33.62	-8.07	$124,639.40
New Democratic	Farheen Khan	4,920	9.49	-9.51	$37,910.15
Green	Linh Nguyen	1,129	2.18	-0.14	–
Total valid votes/Expense limit		51,852	100.0		$218,817.55
Total rejected ballots		342	0.66	–	
Turnout		52,194	63.31	–	
Eligible voters		82,443			
Liberal gain from Conservative		Swing		+13.03	
Source: Elections Canada

2011 federal election redistributed results
Party	Vote	%
Conservative	17,790	41.68
Liberal	15,671	36.72
New Democratic	8,107	19.00
Green	988	2.32
Others	122	0.29

=== 1997–2000 ===
View source data.
Graph of election results in Mississauga Centre (1993 (redistribution)-2000, minor parties that never got 2% of the vote or didn't run consistently are omitted)

2000 Canadian federal election
Party	Candidate	Votes	%	±%
Liberal	Carolyn Parrish	24,381	64.13	-0.91
Alliance	Harry Dhaliwal	6,643	17.47	+2.97
Progressive Conservative	Nina Tangri	5,077	13.35	-1.85
New Democratic	Gail McCabe	1,404	3.69	-1.08
Marijuana	Alan Ward	389	1.02	
Marxist–Leninist	Bob McCabe	125	0.33	-0.15
Total valid votes		38,019	100.0	
Liberal hold		Swing		–1.94

- Canadian Alliance change is from Reform

1997 Canadian federal election
Party	Candidate	Votes	%	±%
Liberal	Carolyn Parrish	25,881	65.04	+6.22
Progressive Conservative	Ahmad Solomah	6,049	15.20	-3.33
Reform	Janice Lim	5,770	14.50	-4.46
New Democratic	Vishnu Roche	1,900	4.77	+2.51
Marxist–Leninist	Amarjit Dhillon	192	0.48	
Total valid votes		39,792	100.0	

1993 federal election redistributed results
Party	Vote	%
Liberal	24,001	58.82
Reform	7,736	18.96
Progressive Conservative	7,561	18.53
New Democratic	923	2.26
Others	583	1.43

== See also ==
- Mississauga Centre (provincial electoral district)
- List of Canadian electoral districts
- Historical federal electoral districts of Canada
