= Mississauga West (federal electoral district) =

Former federal electoral district in Ontario, Canada

Ontario electoral district
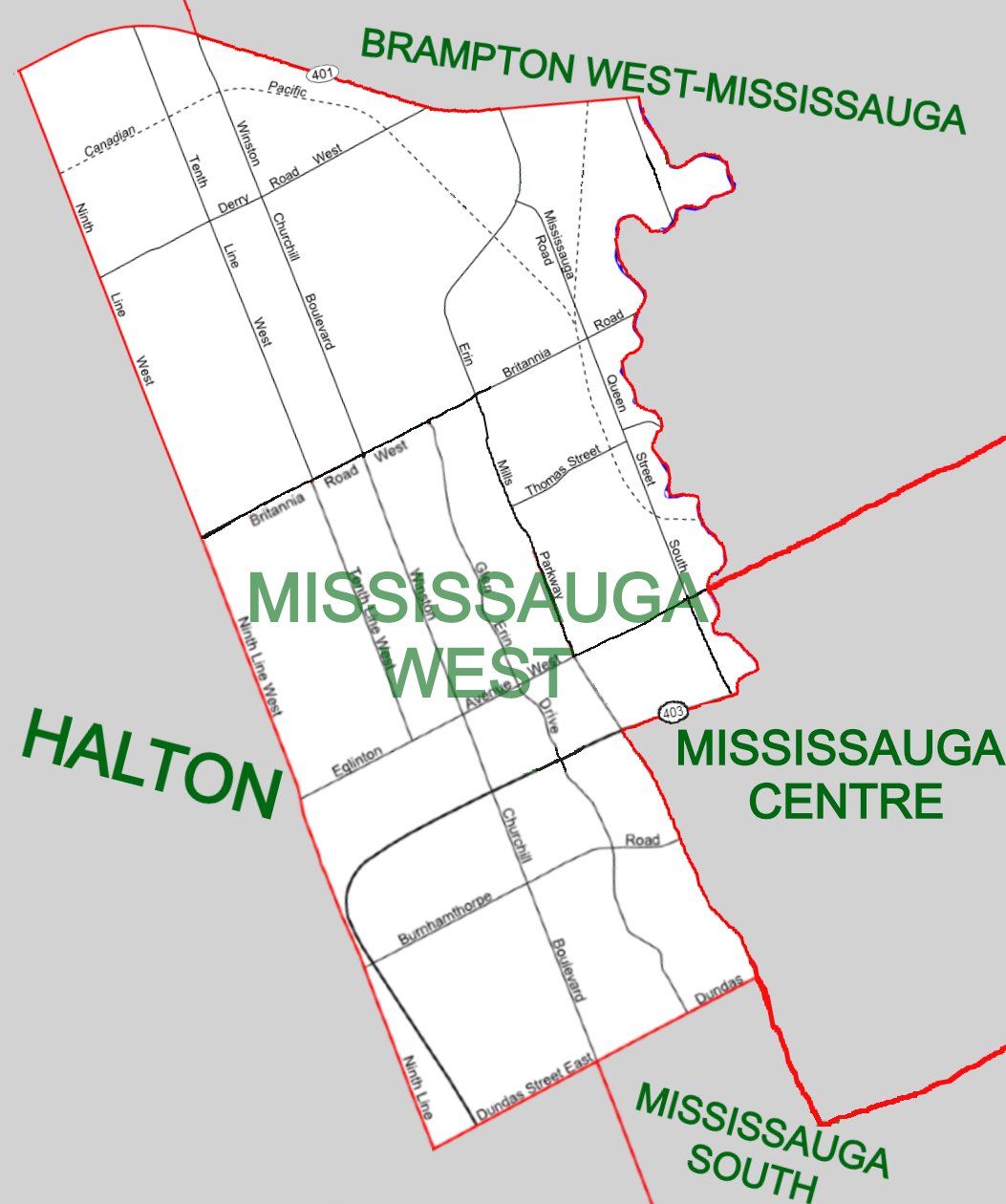
- Map of the riding (1996 boundaries)

Defunct federal electoral district
- Legislature: House of Commons
- District created: 1987
- District abolished: 2003
- First contested: 1988
- Last contested: 2000

Mississauga West was a federal electoral district represented in the House of Commons of Canada from 1988 to 2003. It was located in the city of Mississauga in the province of Ontario. This riding was created in 1987 from Mississauga North riding.

Mississauga West consisted of the part of the City of Mississauga lying of north of Dundas Street West west of the Credit River, north of the Queen Elizabeth Way, and west of Hurontario Street. It was re-defined in 1996.

The electoral district was abolished in 2003 when it was re-distributed between Mississauga South, Mississauga—Erindale and Mississauga—Streetsville ridings.

== Members of Parliament ==
Parliament	Years	Member	Party
Riding created from Mississauga North
34th	1988–1993	Robert Horner	Progressive Conservative
35th	1993–1997	Carolyn Parrish	Liberal
36th	1997–2000	Steve Mahoney	Liberal
37th	2000–2004	Steve Mahoney	Liberal
Riding dissolved into Mississauga South, Mississauga—Erindale and Mississauga—Streetsville

== Electoral history ==
1988 Canadian federal election: Mississauga West
Party	Candidate	Votes	%	±%
Progressive Conservative	Robert Horner	32,992		
Liberal	Doug Fisher	28,444		
New Democratic	Paul Simon	6,621		
Libertarian	C. Garnet Brace	459		

1993 Canadian federal election: Mississauga West
Party	Candidate	Votes	%	±%
Liberal	Carolyn Parrish	53,214		
Progressive Conservative	Robert Horner	27,789		
Reform	Charles Conn	19,838		
New Democratic	Paul Simon	2,195		
Green	Michael Bay	497		
Natural Law	Michael Beifuss	476		
Marxist–Leninist	Gurdev Singh	127		
Abolitionist	Dwayne Foster	78		

1997 Canadian federal election: Mississauga West
Party	Candidate	Votes	%	±%
Liberal	Steve Mahoney	30,598		
Reform	George Brant	9,160		
Progressive Conservative	Rami Gill	8,102		
New Democratic	Timothy Dean Speck	2,128		

2000 Canadian federal election: Mississauga West
Party	Candidate	Votes	%	±%
Liberal	Steve Mahoney	31,260		
Canadian Alliance	Philip Leong	10,582		
Progressive Conservative	Gul Nawaz	5,275		
New Democratic	Cynthia Kazadi	1,532		
Green	Carolyn Brown	810		

== See also ==
- List of Canadian electoral districts
- Historical federal electoral districts of Canada
