= Mississauga—Erindale =

Former federal electoral district in Ontario, Canada

Coordinates: 43.5°N 79.7°W

Ontario electoral district
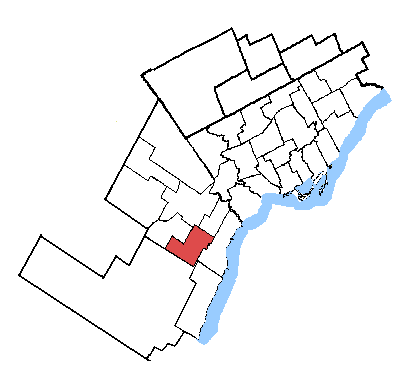
- Mississauga—Erindale in relation to other Greater Toronto ridings

Defunct federal electoral district
- Legislature: House of Commons
- District created: 2003
- District abolished: 2013
- First contested: 2004
- Last contested: 2011
- District webpage: profile, map

Demographics
- Population (2011): 160,663
- Electors (2011): 99,774
- Area (km²): 46.63
- Census division(s): Peel
- Census subdivision(s): Mississauga

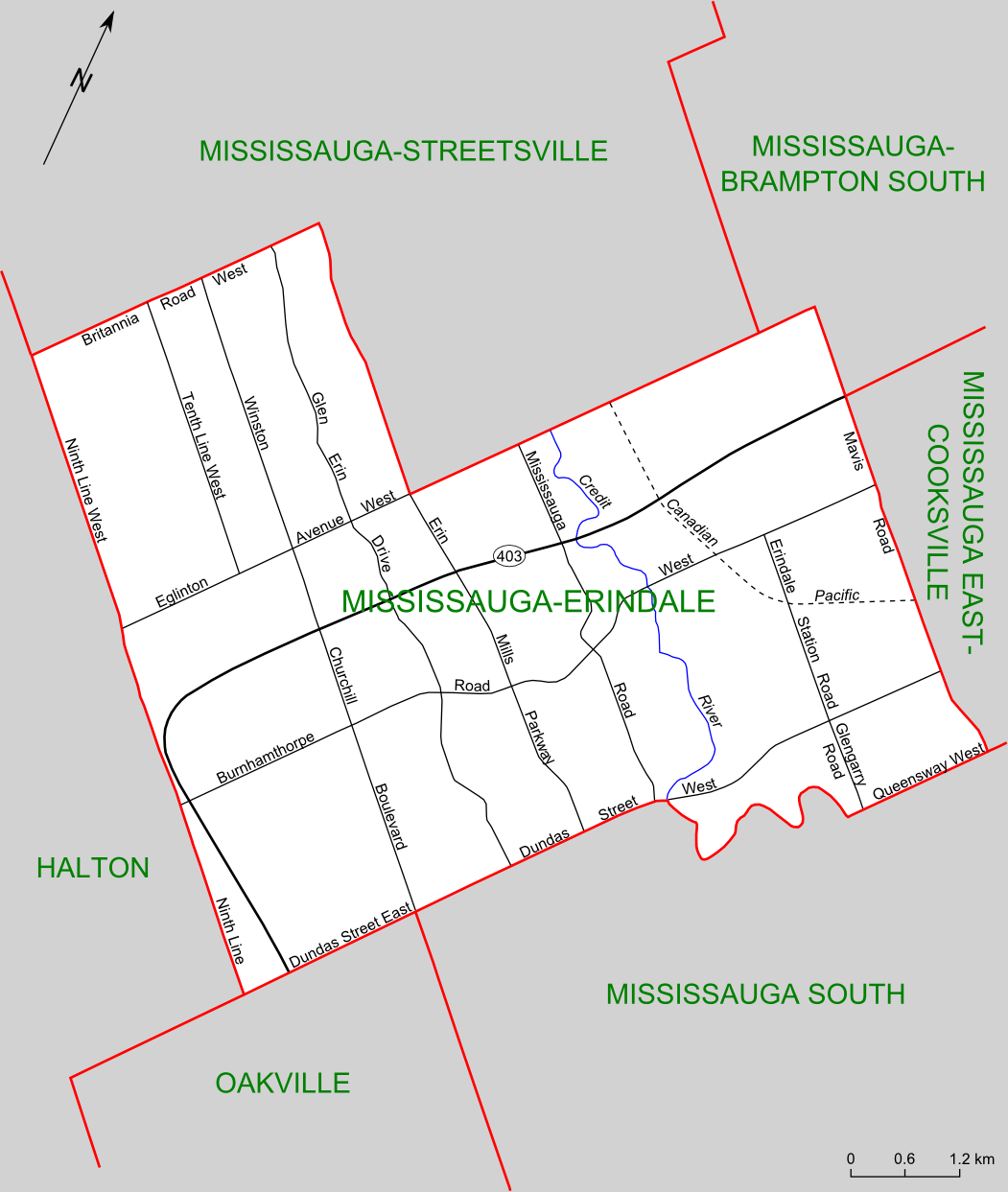
Map of Mississauga-Erindale

Mississauga—Erindale was a federal electoral district in Ontario, Canada, that was represented in the House of Commons of Canada from 2004 to 2015.

It was created in 2003 from parts of Mississauga Centre and Mississauga West ridings. In 2013, it was abolished into Mississauga—Erin Mills, Mississauga Centre and Mississauga—Lakeshore.

It consisted of the part of the City of Mississauga bounded by a line drawn from the southwestern city limit northeast along Britannia Road West, southeast along Erin Mills Parkway, northeast along Eglinton Avenue West, southeast along Mavis Road, southwest along the Queensway West, west along the Credit River and southwest along Dundas Street West to the city limit.

== Members of Parliament ==
This riding has elected the following members of Parliament:

Parliament	Years	Member	Party
Mississauga—Erindale; Riding created from Mississauga Centre and Mississauga West
38th	2004–2004	Carolyn Parrish	Liberal
38th	2004–2006	Carolyn Parrish	Independent
39th	2006–2008	Omar Alghabra	Liberal
40th	2008–2011	Bob Dechert	Conservative
41st	2011–2015	Bob Dechert	Conservative
Riding dissolved into Mississauga—Erin Mills, Mississauga Centre and Mississauga—Lakeshore

== Election results ==
2011 Canadian federal election
Party	Candidate	Votes	%	±%	Expenditures
Conservative	Bob Dechert	29,793	46.95	+4.24	–
Liberal	Omar Alghabra	21,541	33.95	-8.05	–
New Democratic	Michelle Bilek	10,327	16.27	+7.73	–
Green	John Fraser	1,694	2.67	-3.83	–
Marxist–Leninist	Dagmar Sullivan	99	0.16	-0.07	–
Total valid votes		63,454	100.00	–	
Total rejected ballots		217	0.34	-0.02	
Turnout		63,671	61.61	+5.4	
Eligible voters		103,337	–	–	

2008 Canadian federal election
Party	Candidate	Votes	%	±%	Expenditures
Conservative	Bob Dechert	23,863	42.71	+3.3	$96,559
Liberal	Omar Alghabra	23,466	42.00	-2.8	$74,412
New Democratic	Mustafa Rizvi	4,774	8.54	-2.6	$1,330
Green	Richard Pietro	3,636	6.50	+2.1	
Marxist–Leninist	Dagmar Sullivan	129	0.23	-0.3	
Total valid votes/expense limit		55,868	100.00	$98,112	
Total rejected ballots		203	0.36	-0.06	
Turnout		56,071	56.2	-9.9	

2006 Canadian federal election
Party	Candidate	Votes	%	±%	Expenditures
Liberal	Omar Alghabra	26,852	44.81	-9.56	$75,892
Conservative	Bob Dechert	23,524	39.25	+7.30	$81,890
New Democratic	Rupinder Brar	6,644	11.08	+1.26	$3,459
Green	Adam Hunter	2,613	4.36	+0.79	$1,484
Independent	Ronnie Amyotte	289	0.48	–	$1,249
Total valid votes/expense limit		59,922	100.00	$162,852	
Total rejected ballots		251	0.42	-0.10	
Turnout		60,173	65.5	+6.2	

2004 Canadian federal election
Party	Candidate	Votes	%	±%	Expenditures
Liberal	Carolyn Parrish	28,246	54.37		$77,822
Conservative	Bob Dechert	16,600	31.95	–	$77,446
New Democratic	Simon Black	5,104	9.82	–	$2,602
Green	Jeff Brownridge	1,855	3.57	–	$2,212
Marxist–Leninist	David Greig	145	0.28		$37.60
Total valid votes/expense limit		51,950	100.00	$160,120	
Total rejected ballots		269	0.52		
Turnout		52,219	60.3		

== See also ==
- List of Canadian electoral districts
- Historical federal electoral districts of Canada
