= Iqra Khalid =

Canadian politician (born 1985)

Iqra Khalid MP

Member of Parliament for Mississauga—Erin Mills
- Incumbent
- Assumed office October 19, 2015
- Preceded by: Riding established

Parliamentary Secretary to the Minister of National Revenue
- Incumbent
- Assumed office September 18, 2023
- Minister: Marie-Claude Bibeau
- Preceded by: Peter Fragiskatos

Personal details
- Born: November 20, 1986 (age 40) Rukanpur, Rahim Yar Khan District, Punjab, Pakistan
- Party: Liberal
- Education: York University; Cooley Law School
- Profession: Politician

Iqra Khalid MP (born November 20, 1986) is a Canadian politician who has served as the Member of Parliament for the riding of Mississauga—Erin Mills in the House of Commons of Canada since the 2015 federal election. She was re-elected in 2019, 2021, and 2025. She is a member of the Liberal Party.

== Early life and education ==
Khalid was born in Pakistan. In 1993, her family moved to England while her father completed his PhD. In 1998, her family immigrated to Canada, where her parents started a small family business in Mississauga. Iqra and her three brothers helped at this store while they attended school. Khalid attended York University, where she graduated with a degree in criminology and professional writing in 2007. As a student she served as the media ambassador for the York University Student Alumni Program.

Following her graduation she began working at an immigration firm. She then went on to pursue a Juris Doctor degree at Cooley Law School. She wrote her final thesis on a comparative analysis of the effects of culture on the governance and regulation of a nation, using business law in the USA, Canada, India and China as case studies. She graduated with honors distinction in 2012. She then returned to Canada and began working for the legal department of city of Mississauga.

== Political career ==
In December 2014, Khalid won her nomination to be the Liberal Party of Canada’s candidate for the riding of Mississauga-Erin Mills. In the 2015 federal election Khalid defeated two-term Conservative MP Bob Dechert to win the riding. She was re-elected in 2019, 2021, and 2025.

Khalid is currently Vice-Chair of the Standing Committee on the Status of Women (FEWO) and Vice-Chair of the Standing Committee on Government Operations and Estimates (OGGO). She previously served as Vice-Chair of the Standing Committee on Access to Information, Privacy, and Ethics (ETHI), as well as a member of the National Security and Intelligence Committee of Parliamentarians (NSICOP). She has also previously served as chair on the Standing Committee of Justice and Human Rights and sat on the Foreign Affairs and International Development Subcommittee on International Human Rights (SDIR). In addition to these roles, she also served as Chair of the Liberal Women's Caucus and the All-Party Women's Caucus.

In 2018, Khalid sponsored petition E-1566, calling on the Prime Minister to appoint a Minister or special advisor on Seniors Affairs. Later that same year, the Government of Canada appointed Filomena Tassi as the Minister for Seniors.

She was elected vice chair of the Canadian House of Commons Standing Committee on the Status of Women and the Canadian House of Commons Standing Committee on Government Operations and Estimates in the 45th Canadian Parliament in 2025.

=== Justice ===
As a member of the Standing Committee of Justice and Human Rights, Khalid has been involved in debates and studies regarding topics such as Access to Justice, the Court Challenges Program, Physician Assisted Dying legislation, Transgender Rights legislation, Bestiality and Animal Fighting, Online Hate in Canada, and Genetic Discrimination.

In 2017, Khalid tabled a successful motion to undertake a study on human trafficking. After hearing from numerous witnesses and travelling across Canada to examine the issue further, the committee presented its report “Moving Forward in the Fight Against Human Trafficking in Canada”, which included recommendations that would help provide victims of trafficking the support they need and bring traffickers to justice.

Khalid served as chair of the committee from 2019 until 2021, as the members studied Elder Abuse, Canada`s Victims Bill of Rights, Coercive and Controlling Conduct in Intimate Relationships, as well as government legislation and other issues.

=== Human Rights Work ===
As a member of the Subcommittee for International Human Rights, Khalid took part in major studies on human rights situations around the word including human rights violations in Peru, Vietnam, Syria, Iraq, Burundi, Mauritania, China, Venezuela, and the issue of sex trafficking in South Asia. She has also travelled to Kenya and Ethiopia on studies of international development efforts worldwide.

In 2016 Khalid brought forward a successful motion to the Subcommittee for International Human Rights to study the Plight of the Rohingya minority in Myanmar. The report produced by the study was debated in an emergency debate in the House of Commons and as a result Canada became one of the first countries to recognize the genocide of the Rohingya minority in Myanmar.

In 2017 Khalid sponsored petition E609, asking the Canadian government to assist the residents of Aleppo who were affected by the Syrian crisis.

In December 2016, MP Khalid introduced a private members motion asking the government to develop a strategy to tackle systemic racism and religious discrimination. The motion was developed in response to a petition condemning Islamophobia in Canada, which was sponsored by MP Frank Baylis. The motion passed with 2/3 majority approval and a study was commissioned by the Standing Committee on Canadian Heritage. The committee released a report in 2018, and as a result $23 million was marked to invest in anti-racism and anti-discrimination initiatives. In 2023, Khalid testified before the Senate of Canada's Standing Committee on Human Rights regarding her experiences with Islamophobia and its impacts on Canadians.

For her work on human rights, Khalid was named as one of Chatelaine's Women of the Year in 2017.

From 2020 to 2021, Khalid undertook a study of the plight of the Uyghur community with members of the International Human Rights subcommittee. Following testimony from witnesses, the committee concluded that the actions were constructive of genocide.

== Electoral record ==
2025 Canadian federal election: Mississauga—Erin Mills
Party	Candidate	Votes	%	±%	Expenditures
Liberal	Iqra Khalid	33,448	55.71	+4.52	$96,532.02
Conservative	Milad Mikael	24,000	39.97	+6.46	$106,878.82
New Democratic	Ehab Mustapha	1,311	2.18	–8.12	$18,561.08
People's	Michael Bayer	734	1.22	–2.14	$273.46
Green	Sulaiman Khan	367	0.61	–1.02	none listed
Independent	Michael Matulewicz	179	0.30	N/A	$0.00
Total valid votes/expense limit		60,484	99.27	–	$135,409.84
Total rejected ballots		446	0.83		
Turnout		60,930	67.29		
Eligible voters		90,543			
Liberal notional hold		Swing		–1.00	
Source: Elections Canada

2021 Canadian federal election: Mississauga—Erin Mills
Party	Candidate	Votes	%	±%	Expenditures
Liberal	Iqra Khalid	24,119	50.7	-2.8	$110,562.84
Conservative	James Nguyen	15,948	33.5	+0.8	$90,367.11
New Democratic	Kaukab Usman	5,027	10.6	+1.6	$2,730.59
People's	Michael Bayer	1,660	3.5	+2.4	$6,780.03
Green	Ewan DeSilva	786	1.7	-2.0	$0.00
Total valid votes/expense limit		50,672	99.3	–	$116,068.06
Total rejected ballots		379	0.7		
Turnout		51,051	58.6		
Eligible voters		87,176			
Liberal hold		Swing		-1.8	
Source: Elections Canada

2019 Canadian federal election: Mississauga—Erin Mills
Party	Candidate	Votes	%	±%	Expenditures
Liberal	Iqra Khalid	31,181	53.52	+3.80	$101,599.80
Conservative	Hani Tawfilis	19,050	32.70	-6.54	$89,830.66
New Democratic	Salman Tariq	5,236	8.99	-0.42	none listed
Green	Remo Boscarino-Gaetano	2,147	3.69	+2.05	$0.00
People's	Hazar Alsabagh	648	1.11	–	$2,780.16
Total valid votes/expense limit		58,262	99.82		
Total rejected ballots		637	1.08	+0.64	
Turnout		58,899	66.39	-0.54	
Eligible voters		88,722			
Liberal hold		Swing		+5.17	
Source: Elections Canada

2015 Canadian federal election: Mississauga—Erin Mills
Party	Candidate	Votes	%	±%	Expenditures
Liberal	Iqra Khalid	27,520	49.7	+15.31	–
Conservative	Bob Dechert	21,716	39.2	-7.38	–
New Democratic	Michelle Bilek	5,206	9.4	-6.75	–
Green	Andrew Roblin	905	1.6	-1.14	–
Total valid votes/Expense limit		55,347	100.0		$216,923.79
Total rejected ballots		245	–	–	
Turnout		55,592	67.5	–	
Eligible voters		82,348			
Source: Elections Canada
