= Omar Alghabra =

Canadian politician

The Honourable Omar Alghabra PC
- عمر الغبرا
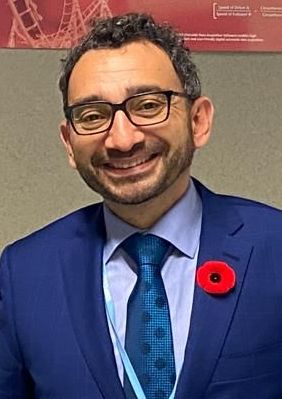
- Alghabra in 2021

Minister of Transport
- In office January 12, 2021 – July 26, 2023
- Prime Minister: Justin Trudeau
- Preceded by: Marc Garneau
- Succeeded by: Pablo Rodriguez

Member of Parliament for Mississauga Centre
- In office October 19, 2015 – April 28, 2025
- Preceded by: Riding established
- Succeeded by: Fares Al Soud

Member of Parliament for Mississauga—Erindale
- In office January 23, 2006 – October 14, 2008
- Preceded by: Carolyn Parrish
- Succeeded by: Bob Dechert

Personal details
- Born: October 24, 1969 (age 56) Al-Khobar, Saudi Arabia
- Citizenship: Canadian; Syrian
- Party: Liberal

Omar Alghabra PC (Arabic: عمر الغبرا, romanized: ʿUmar al-Ḡabrā; born October 24, 1969) is a Saudi-born Syrian-Canadian politician who served as Canada's minister of transport from 2021 to 2023. A member of the Liberal Party, he represented the riding of Mississauga Centre in the House of Commons from 2015 election until 2025. He was previously the member of Parliament (MP) for Mississauga—Erindale from 2006 to 2008.

== Early life and education ==
Alghabra was born in Al-Khobar, Saudi Arabia to a Syrian family. His father, an architect, moved their family to Saudi Arabia in 1968. Alghabra has stated that he remembers living a sheltered life there, attending private school and visiting Syria in the summer. Alghabra completed his high school education at the Dhahran Ahliyya School in Alkhobar. He then moved to Damascus, Syria, where he started his engineering degree at Damascus University. He decided to complete his education in Canada.

Alghabra moved to Toronto when he was 19 years old to attend school. He attended grade 13 to obtain his Ontario high school diploma. Later, he completed his Bachelor of Engineering at Ryerson Polytechnical Institute.

Alghabra also attended York University, where he graduated with a Master of Business Administration.

== Professional career ==
Alghabra's first job was at Ainsworth Inc. as a quality assurance supervisor. He later transitioned to sales and worked as the predictive maintenance supervisor. Afterwards, he joined General Electric (GE) as a Six Sigma Black Belt in the industrial service business. He became the global business leader for GE's industrial refurbished parts business.

After his political defeat in the 2008 general election, Alghabra joined ENBALA Power Networks as their vice president for corporate development. Later, he worked as an advisor to the COO of the Ontario Energy Board on innovation in the utility sector. Alghabra returned to the Faculty of Engineering and Architectural Science after being appointed a distinguished visiting professor. In this role, he also joined Ryerson's start-up incubator DMZ as their executive-in-residence.

Alghabra was the president of the Canadian Arab Federation (CAF) in 2004–2005. After Alghabra left CAF, the group made controversial statements, and Alghabra condemned those statements.

== Political career ==
Alghabra entered federal politics after MP Carolyn Parrish retired, with him running as the Liberal candidate in the 2006 federal election in the riding of Mississauga—Erindale. He defeated Charles Sousa for the party's nomination, and left General Electric to run in the federal election. He defeated Conservative candidate Bob Dechert by 3,328 votes. Alghabra was later defeated in the 2008 and 2011 federal elections. However, he was then elected in the 2015 federal election in a political comeback, becoming the Liberal MP for Mississauga Centre. He would be re-elected in 2019 and 2021.

Alghabra served as parliament secretary to the minister of foreign affairs (consular affairs) from 2015 to 2018 and parliament secretary to the minister of international trade diversification from 2018 to 2019. He was appointed as parliament secretary to the prime minister (public service renewal) and parliament secretary to the deputy prime minister and minister of intergovernmental affairs. He was also sworn in as a member of the Privy Council in February 2020. In the Cabinet reshuffle on January 12, 2021, Alghabra became the transport minister, succeeding Marc Garneau.

Following a motion condemning Islamophobia amidst death threats to Muslim MPs, Alghabra stated that his primary concern was his staff who process these messages. He continued that it is important to have a conversation about Islamophobia and that he purposely does not delete comments received on his Facebook page. Alghabra attributes backlash against the motion to a campaign of misinformation and ignorance.

=== Trudeau government ===
==== Backbencher ====
As Parliament Secretary, Alghabra had a consular affairs file that oversaw 250,000 cases. He worked on the cases on John Ridsdel, Joshua Boyle and helped assisting Canadians stranded by Hurricane Irma in the Caribbean.

Alghabra was appointed Parliament Secretary to the Minister of International Trade Diversification and served from 2018 to 2019. Alghabra also served on the Standing Committee for International Trade.

Alghabra was tasked with working directly with victims' families of the Ukrainian International Airlines Flight PS752. Alghabra stated that the government is offering legal assistance and exploring forms of interim compensation while they wait for proper compensation to be settled with Iran. Alghabra also announced that Ottawa will match funds raised during the Canada Strong campaign launched to raise $1.5 million for those who lost loved ones when the Ukrainian passenger plane was shot down by the Iranian military.

==== Minister of Transport ====
Alghabra became Minister of Transport on January 12, 2021, following the resignation of industry minister Navdeep Bains, resulting in a Cabinet shuffle.

On July 25, 2023, Alghabra announced he was stepping down from cabinet and would not run in the 2025 election.

==== Return to the backbenches ====
In January 2025, Alghabra, alongside International Development Minister Ahmed Hussen went on a Middle Eastern tour to discuss regional issues after the fall of the Assad regime the previous December. The trip included the first Canadian delegatory visit to the Syria–Turkey border area and meetings on Syria and the Middle East in Qatar with the minister of state for international cooperation, in Turkey with the deputy foreign minister, as well as a meeting in Saudi Arabia with the minister of state for foreign affairs and the secretary general of the Gulf Cooperation Council. On February 7, 2025, Alghabra was appointed Special Envoy for Syria.

== Electoral record ==
2021 Canadian federal election
Party	Candidate	Votes	%	±%
Liberal	Omar Alghabra	25,714	54.22	–1.54
Conservative	Kathy-Ying Zhao	13,390	28.23	–1.30
New Democratic	Teneshia Samuel	5,330	11.24	+1.62
People's	Elie Diab	2,148	4.53	+2.97
Green	Craig Laferriere	864	1.82	–1.24
Total valid votes		47,431		
Total rejected ballots		462	0.96	
Turnout		47,893	56.32	
Eligible voters		85,044		
Liberal hold		Swing		–1.54
Source: Elections Canada

2019 Canadian federal election: Mississauga Centre
Party	Candidate	Votes	%	±%	Expenditures
Liberal	Omar Alghabra	29,974	55.76	+1.04	$93,154.83
Conservative	Milad Mikael	15,874	29.53	-4.09	none listed
New Democratic	Sarah Walji	5,173	9.62	+0.13	none listed
Green	Hugo Reinoso	1,646	3.06	+0.88	$0.00
People's	David Micalef	837	1.56	–	$1,997.84
Independent	Greg Vezina	252	0.47	–	$1,248.05
Total valid votes/expense limit		53,756	100.0		
Total rejected ballots		475			
Turnout		54,231	62.3		
Eligible voters		87,047			
Liberal hold		Swing		+2.57	
Source: Elections Canada

2015 Canadian federal election: Mississauga Centre (federal electoral district)
Party	Candidate	Votes	%	±%	Expenditures
Liberal	Omar Alghabra	28,372	54.72	+20.77	–
Conservative	Julius Tiangson	17,431	33.62	-8.06	–
New Democratic	Farheen Khan	4,920	9.49	-9.51	–
Green	Linh Nguyen	1,129	2.18	-0.14	–
Total valid votes/Expense limit		51,852	100.0		$218,539.24
Total rejected ballots		342	–	–	
Turnout		52,194	–	–	
Eligible voters		82,443			
Source: Elections Canada

2011 Canadian federal election: Mississauga-Erindale
Party	Candidate	Votes	%	±%	Expenditures
Conservative	Bob Dechert	29,793	46.95	+4.24	–
Liberal	Omar Alghabra	21,541	33.95	-8.05	–
New Democratic	Michelle Bilek	10,327	16.27	+7.73	–
Green	John Fraser	1,694	2.67	-3.83	–
Marxist–Leninist	Dagmar Sullivan	99	0.16	-0.07	–
Total valid votes		63,454	100.00	–	
Total rejected ballots		217	0.34	-0.02	
Turnout		63,671	61.61	+5.4	
Eligible voters		103,337	–	–	

2008 Canadian federal election: Mississauga-Erindale
Party	Candidate	Votes	%	±%	Expenditures
Conservative	Bob Dechert	23,863	42.71	+3.3	$96,559
Liberal	Omar Alghabra	23,466	42.00	-2.8	$74,412
New Democratic	Mustafa Rizvi	4,774	8.54	-2.6	$1,330
Green	Richard Pietro	3,636	6.50	+2.1	
Marxist–Leninist	Dagmar Sullivan	129	0.23	-0.3	
Total valid votes/Expense limit		55,868	100.00	$98,112	
Total rejected ballots		203	0.36	-0.06	
Turnout		56,071	56.2	-9.9	

2006 Canadian federal election: Mississauga-Erindale
Party	Candidate	Votes	%	±%	Expenditures
Liberal	Omar Alghabra	26,852	44.81	-9.56	$75,892
Conservative	Bob Dechert	23,524	39.25	+7.30	$81,890
New Democratic	Rupinder Brar	6,644	11.08	+1.26	$3,459
Green	Adam Hunter	2,613	4.36	+0.79	$1,484
Independent	Ronnie Amyotte	289	0.48	–	$1,249
Total valid votes/Expense limit		59,922	100.00	$162,852	
Total rejected ballots		251	0.42	-0.10	
Turnout		60,173	65.5	+6.2	

29th Canadian Ministry (2015–2025) – Cabinet of Justin Trudeau
Cabinet post (1)
Predecessor	Office	Successor
Marc Garneau	Minister of Transport; January 12, 2021 – July 26, 2023	Pablo Rodriguez
