= Mississauga—Erin Mills (federal electoral district) =

Federal electoral district in Ontario, Canada

Coordinates: 43.545°N 79.698°W

Ontario electoral district
- Interactive map of riding boundaries from the 2025 federal election

Federal electoral district
- Legislature: House of Commons
MP
Iqra Khalid
Liberal
- District created: 2013
- First contested: 2015
- Last contested: 2025
- District webpage: profile, map

Demographics
- Population (2016): 122,560
- Electors (2015): 80,912
- Area (km²): 33.75
- Pop. density (per km²): 3,631.4
- Census division: Peel
- Census subdivision: Mississauga

Mississauga—Erin Mills is a federal electoral district in Ontario. It encompasses a portion of Ontario formerly included in the electoral district of Mississauga—Erindale.

Mississauga—Erin Mills was created by the 2012 federal electoral boundaries redistribution and was legally defined in the 2013 representation order. It came into effect upon the call of the 42nd Canadian federal election, held on 19 October 2015.

Following the 2022 Canadian federal electoral redistribution, the riding lost all of its territory east of Erin Mills Parkway that is north of the 403 to Mississauga—Streetsville. This change came into effect upon the 2025 Canadian federal election.

== Demographics ==
According to the 2021 Canadian census

Ethnic groups: 30.1% White, 26.8% South Asian, 10.8% Chinese, 10.0% Arab, 6.6% Black, 4.8% Filipino, 1.8% Latin American, 1.5% Southeast Asian, 1.4% West Asian, 1.2% Korean

Languages: 43.0% English, 7.9% Arabic, 7.8% Urdu, 5.1% Mandarin, 2.5% Cantonese, 2.3% Polish, 2.2% Tagalog, 1.8% Spanish, 1.4% Hindi, 1.4% Punjabi, 1.3% Portuguese, 1.2% Tamil

Religions: 45.4% Christian (26.4% Catholic, 3.3% Christian Orthodox, 2.1% Anglican, 1.3% United Church, 1.2% Pentecostal, 11.1% Other), 24.9% Muslim, 7.5% Hindu, 1.8% Sikh, 1.6% Buddhist, 17.8% No religion

Median income: $39,600 (2020)

Average income: $54,550 (2020)

== Riding associations ==
Riding associations are the local branches of political parties:

Party	Association name	CEO	HQ City
Conservative	Mississauga--Erin Mills Conservative Association	Andrew P. Potter	Mississauga
Liberal	Mississauga--Erin Mills Federal Liberal Association	Reema Zuberi	Mississauga
New Democratic	Mississauga--Erin Mills Federal NDP Riding Association	kaukab Usman	Mississauga

== Members of Parliament ==
This riding has elected the following members of Parliament:

Parliament	Years	Member	Party
Mississauga—Erin Mills; Riding created from Mississauga—Erindale and Halton
42nd	2015–2019	Iqra Khalid	Liberal
43rd	2019–2021	Iqra Khalid	Liberal
44th	2021–2025	Iqra Khalid	Liberal
45th	2025–present	Iqra Khalid	Liberal

== Election results ==
View source data.
Graph of election results in Mississauga—Erin Mills (parties that never received 2% of the vote are omitted)

2025 Canadian federal election
Party	Candidate	Votes	%	±%	Expenditures
Liberal	Iqra Khalid	33,448	55.71	+4.52	$96,532.02
Conservative	Milad Mikael	24,000	39.97	+6.46	$106,878.82
New Democratic	Ehab Mustapha	1,311	2.18	–8.12	$18,561.08
People's	Michael Bayer	734	1.22	–2.14	$273.46
Green	Sulaiman Khan	367	0.61	–1.02	none listed
Independent	Michael Matulewicz	179	0.30	N/A	$0.00
Total valid votes/expense limit		60,484	99.27	–	$135,409.84
Total rejected ballots		446	0.83		
Turnout		60,930	67.29		
Eligible voters		90,543			
Liberal notional hold		Swing		–1.00	
Source: Elections Canada

2021 federal election redistributed results
Party	Vote	%
Liberal	25,115	51.19
Conservative	16,440	33.51
New Democratic	5,054	10.30
People's	1,650	3.36
Green	802	1.63

2021 Canadian federal election
Party	Candidate	Votes	%	±%	Expenditures
Liberal	Iqra Khalid	24,119	50.7	-2.8	$110,562.84
Conservative	James Nguyen	15,948	33.5	+0.8	$90,367.11
New Democratic	Kaukab Usman	5,027	10.6	+1.6	$2,730.59
People's	Michael Bayer	1,660	3.5	+2.4	$6,780.03
Green	Ewan DeSilva	786	1.7	-2.0	$0.00
Total valid votes/expense limit		50,672	99.3	–	$116,068.06
Total rejected ballots		379	0.7		
Turnout		51,051	58.6		
Eligible voters		87,176			
Liberal hold		Swing		-1.8	
Source: Elections Canada

2019 Canadian federal election
Party	Candidate	Votes	%	±%	Expenditures
Liberal	Iqra Khalid	31,181	53.52	+3.80	$101,599.80
Conservative	Hani Tawfilis	19,050	32.70	-6.54	$89,830.66
New Democratic	Salman Tariq	5,236	8.99	-0.42	none listed
Green	Remo Boscarino-Gaetano	2,147	3.69	+2.05	$0.00
People's	Hazar Alsabagh	648	1.11	–	$2,780.16
Total valid votes/expense limit		58,262	99.82		
Total rejected ballots		637	1.08	+0.64	
Turnout		58,899	66.39	-0.54	
Eligible voters		88,722			
Liberal hold		Swing		+5.17	
Source: Elections Canada

2015 Canadian federal election: Mississauga—Erin Mills
Party	Candidate	Votes	%	±%	Expenditures
Liberal	Iqra Khalid	27,520	49.72	+15.34	$76,451.79
Conservative	Bob Dechert	21,716	39.24	-7.35	$193,213.89
New Democratic	Michelle Bilek	5,206	9.41	-6.74	$16,151.22
Green	Andrew Roblin	905	1.64	-1.11	–
Total valid votes/Expense limit		55,347	99.56		$218,158.57
Total rejected ballots		245	0.44	–	
Turnout		55,592	66.93	–	
Eligible voters		83,062			
Liberal gain from Conservative		Swing		+11.34	
Source: Elections Canada

2011 federal election redistributed results
Party	Vote	%
Conservative	21,646	46.58
Liberal	15,978	34.39
New Democratic	7,503	16.15
Green	1,274	2.74
Marxist–Leninist	66	0.14

== See also ==
- List of Canadian electoral districts
- Historical federal electoral districts of Canada
