= Mississauga East—Cooksville (federal electoral district) =

Federal electoral district in Ontario, Canada

Coordinates: 43.6°N 79.6°W

Ontario electoral district
- Interactive map of riding boundaries from the 2025 federal election

Federal electoral district
- Legislature: House of Commons
MP
Peter Fonseca
Liberal
- District created: 2003
- First contested: 2004
- Last contested: 2021
- District webpage: profile, map

Demographics
- Population (2011): 121,792
- Electors (2015): 80,906
- Area (km²): 34
- Pop. density (per km²): 3,582.1
- Census division: Peel
- Census subdivision: Mississauga

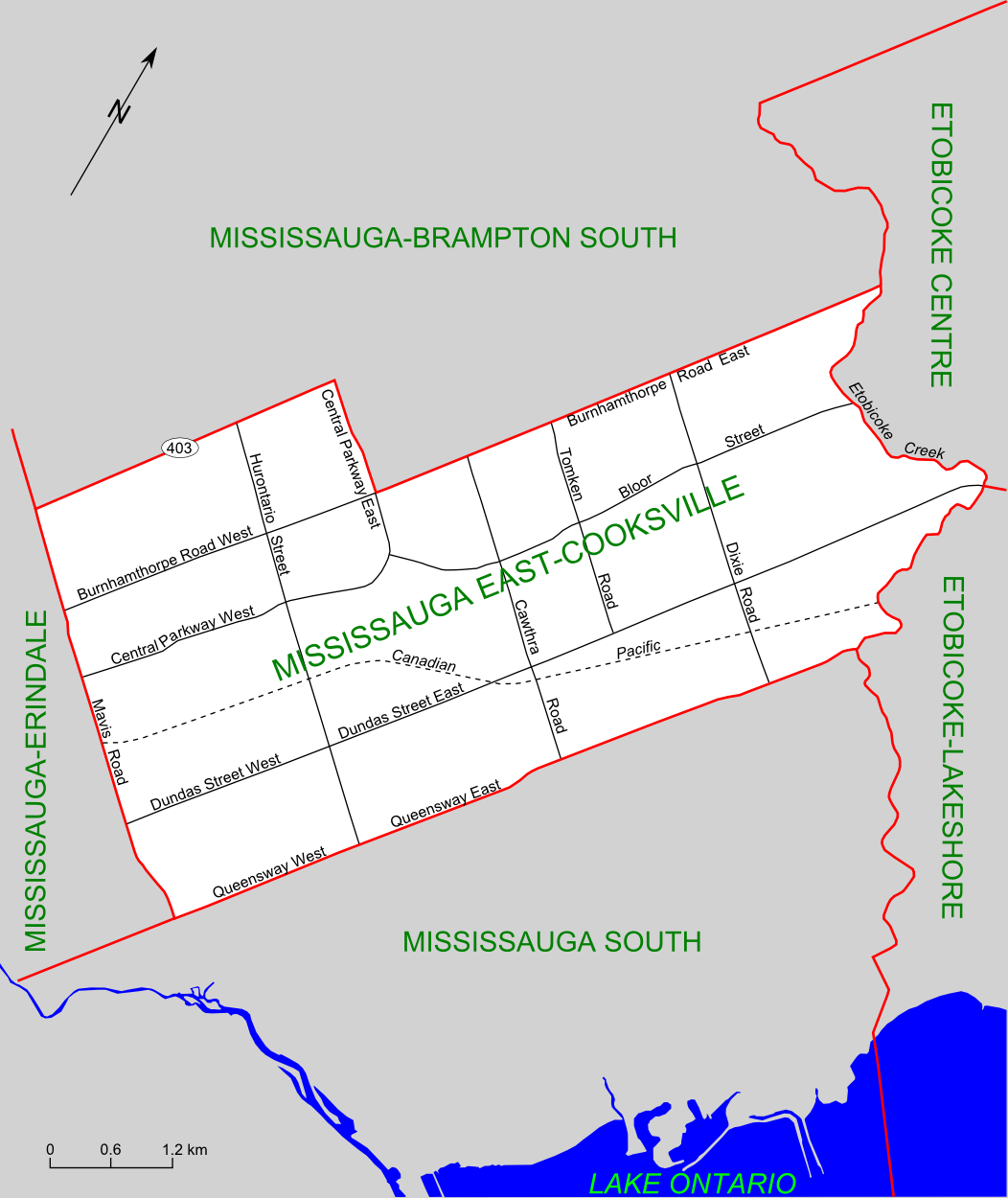
Map of Mississauga East-Cooksville (2003 boundaries)

Mississauga East—Cooksville (French: Mississauga-Est—Cooksville) is a federal electoral district in Ontario, Canada, that has been represented in the House of Commons of Canada since 2004.

== History ==
It was created in 2003 from parts of Mississauga Centre and Mississauga East ridings.

Following the 2012 redistribution, the riding will include parts of Mississauga—Brampton South and Mississauga South for the next election. The northern Burnhamthorpe boundary would change to Eglinton. This would mean that Rockwood Village would move from Mississauga—Brampton South to the "Mississauga East-Cooksville" riding.

It consisted of the part of the City of Mississauga east of a line drawn from north to south along the Queensway, Mavis Road, Central Parkway East, HWY 403 and Eglington Avenue East. It includes the neighbourhood of Cooksville, from which the riding derives part of its name.

== Demographics ==
According to the 2021 Canadian census

Ethnic groups: 48.5% White, 16.3% South Asian, 7.4% Filipino, 6.4% Black, 4.3% Chinese, 4.2% Arab, 3.2% Southeast Asian, 2.9% Latin American, 1.2% West Asian

Languages: 39.9% English, 6.5% Polish, 3.6% Tagalog, 3.5% Arabic, 3.5% Urdu, 2.9% Portuguese, 2.9% Ukrainian, 2.8% Spanish, 2.3% Vietnamese, 2.3% Italian, 2.1% Mandarin, 1.6% Tamil, 1.5% Serbian, 1.4% Cantonese, 1.2% Russian

Religions: 60.0% Christian (39.0% Catholic, 5.9% Christian Orthodox, 1.7% Anglican, 1.3% United Church, 1.1% Pentecostal, 11.0% Other), 13.5% Muslim, 6.0% Hindu, 2.3% Buddhist, 1.1% Sikh, 16.5% None

Median income: $37,200 (2020)

Average income: $47,360 (2020)

== Riding associations ==
Riding associations are the local branches of political parties:

Party	Association name	CEO	HQ City
Conservative	Mississauga East--Cooksville Conservative Association	Eric Y. Wen	Mississauga
Liberal	Mississauga East--Cooksville Federal Liberal Association	Mashkoor Sherwani	Mississauga
New Democratic	Mississauga East--Cooksville Federal NDP Riding Association	Shannon Cruickshank	Ottawa

== Members of Parliament ==
This riding has elected the following members of Parliament:

Parliament	Years	Member	Party
Mississauga East—Cooksville; Riding created from Mississauga Centre and Mississauga East
38th	2004–2006	Albina Guarnieri	Liberal
39th	2006–2008	Albina Guarnieri	Liberal
40th	2008–2011	Albina Guarnieri	Liberal
41st	2011–2015	Wladyslaw Lizon	Conservative
42nd	2015–2019	Peter Fonseca	Liberal
43rd	2019–2021	Peter Fonseca	Liberal
44th	2021–2025	Peter Fonseca	Liberal
45th	2025–present	Peter Fonseca	Liberal

== Election results ==
View source data.
Graph of election results in Mississauga East—Cooksville (parties that never received 2% of the vote are omitted)

2025 Canadian federal election
Party	Candidate	Votes	%	±%	Expenditures
Liberal	Peter Fonseca	27,138	50.20	–0.08	$119,366.85
Conservative	Nita Kang	24,112	44.61	+13.01	$107,165.88
New Democratic	Khawar Hussain	1,508	2.79	–7.71	$5,245.03
People's	Amit Gupta	964	1.78	–4.67	$5,418.03
Independent	Winston Harding	221	0.41	N/A	none listed
Marxist–Leninist	Dagmar Sullivan	113	0.21	–0.03	$0.00
Total valid votes/expense limit		54,056	98.88	–	$130,308.25
Total rejected ballots		610	1.12		
Turnout		54,666	64.04		
Eligible voters		85,360			
Liberal notional hold		Swing		–6.55	
Source: Elections Canada

2021 federal election redistributed results
Party	Vote	%
Liberal	23,278	50.28
Conservative	14,632	31.60
New Democratic	4,863	10.50
People's	2,988	6.45
Green	150	0.32
Others	388	0.84

2021 Canadian federal election
Party	Candidate	Votes	%	±%	Expenditures
Liberal	Peter Fonseca	22,806	50.0	-3.1	$48,174.27
Conservative	Grace Adamu	14,722	32.3	-1.3	$16,774.32
New Democratic	Tom Takacs	4,678	10.3	+1.5	1,363.00
People's	Joseph Westover	2,933	6.4	+5.2	$809.98
Independent	Gord Elliott	329	0.7	N/A	$0.00
Marxist–Leninist	Dagmar Sullivan	107	0.2	-0.1	$0.00
Total valid votes/expense limit		45,575	99.2	–	$112,477.70
Total rejected ballots		383	0.8		
Turnout		45,958	55.6		
Eligible voters		82,603			
Liberal hold		Swing		-0.9	
Source: Elections Canada

2019 Canadian federal election
Party	Candidate	Votes	%	±%	Expenditures
Liberal	Peter Fonseca	27,923	53.1	-1.13	$54,292.81
Conservative	Wladyslaw Lizon	17,664	33.6	-1.75	none listed
New Democratic	Tom Takacs	4,643	8.8	+0.17	none listed
Green	Maha Rasheed	1,578	3.0	+1.52	$0.00
People's	Syed Rizvi	637	1.2		$2,799.42
Marxist–Leninist	Anna Di Carlo	178	0.3	-0.01	$0.00
Total valid votes/expense limit		52,623	100.0		
Total rejected ballots		483			
Turnout		53,106	62.1		
Eligible voters		85,584			
Liberal hold		Swing		+0.31	
Source: Elections Canada

2015 Canadian federal election
Party	Candidate	Votes	%	±%	Expenditures
Liberal	Peter Fonseca	28,154	54.23	+18.07	$85,296.75
Conservative	Wladyslaw Lizon	18,353	35.35	-8.20	$109,692.04
New Democratic	Ali Naqvi	4,481	8.63	-9.03	$34,143.24
Green	Jaymini Bhikha	766	1.48	-0.69	–
Marxist–Leninist	Tim Sullivan	163	0.31	–	–
Total valid votes/expense limit		51,917	100.00		$217,661.14
Total rejected ballots		287	0.55		
Turnout		52,204	63.87		
Eligible voters		81,736			
Liberal gain from Conservative		Swing		+13.13	
Source(s): "Mississaugs East--Cooksville". Election Results. Elections Canada.; Elections Canada – Preliminary Election Expenses Limits for Candidates

2011 federal election redistributed results
Party	Vote	%
Conservative	19,269	43.55
Liberal	15,999	36.16
New Democratic	7,814	17.66
Green	959	2.17
Others	209	0.47

2011 Canadian federal election
Party	Candidate	Votes	%	±%	Expenditures
Conservative	Wladyslaw Lizon	18,796	39.97	+7.42	$90,142
Liberal	Peter Fonseca	18,120	38.53	-11.63	$71,450
New Democratic	Waseem Ahmed	8,836	18.79	+7.44	$6,591
Green	Jaymini Bhikha	1,032	2.19	-3.05	$968
Marxist–Leninist	Pierre Chénier	241	0.51	-0.16	
Total valid votes/expense limit		47,025	100.00		$169,151
Total rejected ballots		289	0.61		
Turnout		47,314	56.8		
Eligible voters		83,018			
Conservative gain from Liberal		Swing		+9.52	
Source(s) Elections Canada (2011). "Official Voting Results: Forty-first General Election".

2008 Canadian federal election
Party	Candidate	Votes	%	±%	Expenditures
Liberal	Albina Guarnieri	20,457	50.16	-1.49	$45,484
Conservative	Melissa Bhagat	13,277	32.55	+1.11	$33,438
New Democratic	Satish Balasunderam	4,632	11.35	-0.02	
Green	Jaymini Bhikha	2,138	5.24	+2.19	$463
Marxist–Leninist	Pierre Chénier	277	0.67	+0.32	
Total valid votes/expense limit		40,781	100.0		$87,933
Total rejected ballots		280	0.68		
Turnout		41,061	49.12		
Eligible voters		83,582			
Liberal hold		Swing		-1.30	
Source(s) Elections Canada (2008). "Official Voting Results: Fortieth General Election".

2006 Canadian federal election
Party	Candidate	Votes	%	±%
Liberal	Albina Guarnieri	23,530	51.65	-5.05
Conservative	Carl DeFaria	14,326	31.44	+5.42
New Democratic	Jim Gill	5,180	11.37	-0.30
Green	Richard Pietro	1,393	3.05	+0.11
Independent	Mohamed Elrofaie	496	1.08	
Christian Heritage	Sally Wong	467	1.02	-0.94
Marxist–Leninist	Pierre Chénier	164	0.35	-0.03
Total valid votes		45,556	100.00	
Total rejected ballots		240	0.52	
Turnout		45,796	58.34	
Eligible voters		78,492		
Liberal hold		Swing		-5.23
Source(s) Elections Canada (2006). "Official Voting Results: Thirty-Ninth General Election".

2004 Canadian federal election
Party	Candidate	Votes	%
Liberal	Albina Guarnieri	22,435	56.70
Conservative	Riina DeFaria	10,299	26.02
New Democratic	Jim Gill	4,619	11.67
Green	Jason Robert Hinchcliffe	1,167	2.94
Christian Heritage	Sally Wong	778	1.96
Marxist–Leninist	Pierre Chénier	154	0.38
Independent	Andrew Seitz	114	0.28
Total valid votes		39,566	100.0
Total rejected ballots		221	0.55
Turnout		39,787	52.43
Eligible voters		75,883	
Source(s) Elections Canada (2004). "Official Voting Results: Thirty-Eighth General Election".

== See also ==
- Mississauga East—Cooksville (provincial electoral district)
- List of Canadian electoral districts
- Historical federal electoral districts of Canada
