= Mississauga—Brampton South =

Coordinates: 43.7°N 79.7°W

Ontario electoral district
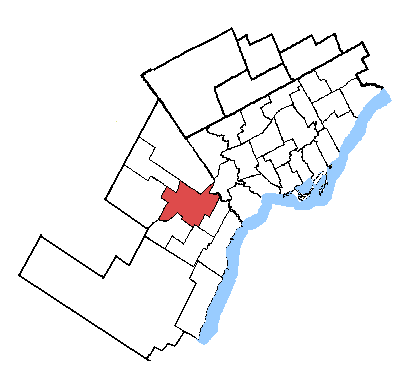
- Mississauga—Brampton South in relation to other Greater Toronto ridings

Defunct federal electoral district
- Legislature: House of Commons
- District created: 2003
- District abolished: 2013
- First contested: 2004
- Last contested: 2011

Demographics
- Population (2011): 147,096
- Electors (2011): 90,777
- Area (km²): 78.01
- Census division(s): Peel
- Census subdivision(s): Mississauga, Brampton

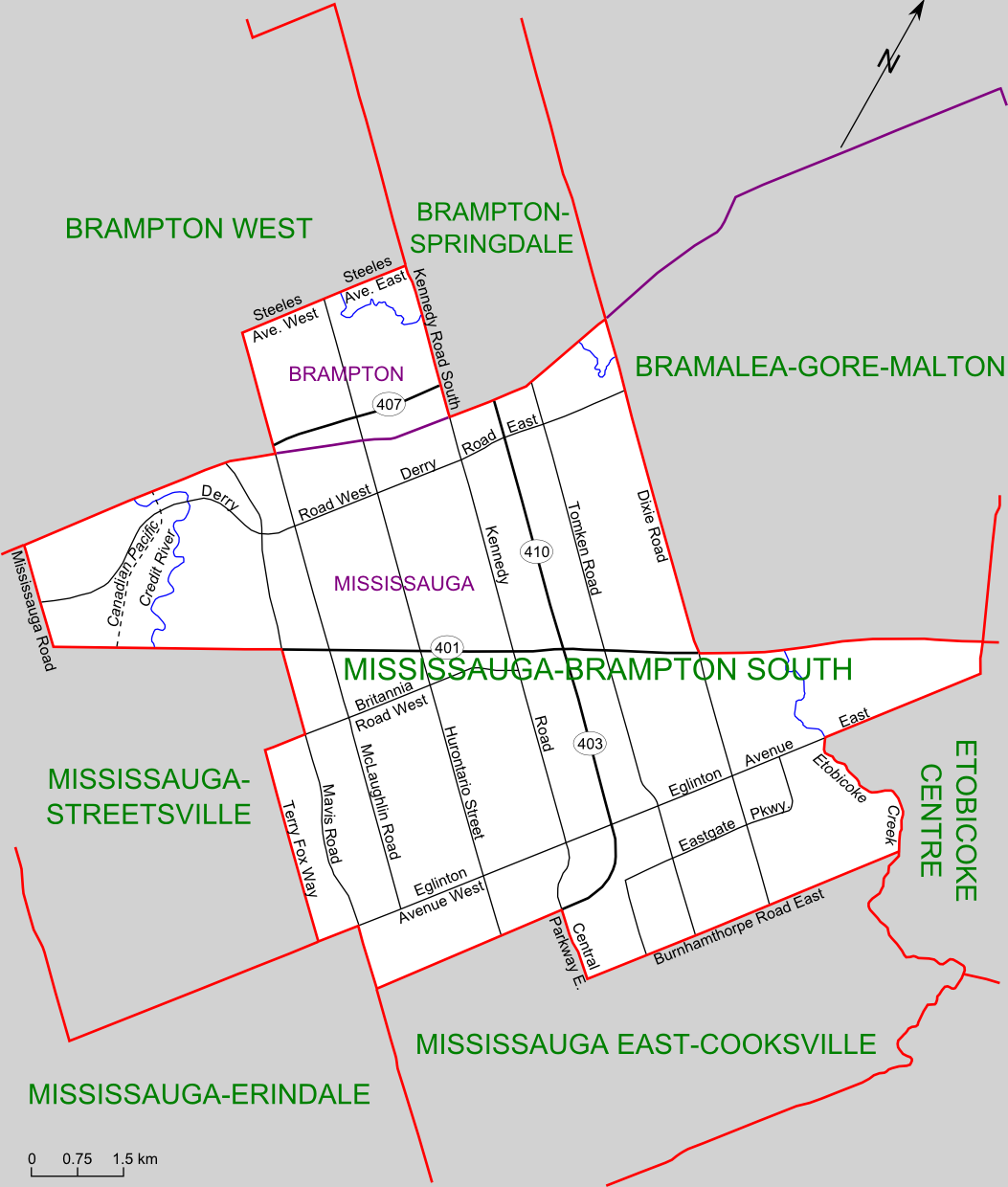
Map of Mississauga-Brampton South

Mississauga—Brampton South was a federal electoral district in Ontario, Canada, that was represented in the House of Commons of Canada from 2004 to 2015.

It consists of the parts of the cities of Mississauga and Brampton bounded by a line drawn from the intersection of Highway 401 with the northeastern limit of the City of Mississauga, south along the city limit, southwest along Burnhamthorpe Road East, northwest along Central Parkway East, southwest along Highway 403, northwest along Mavis Road; thence northwesterly along said road to Eglinton Avenue West; thence southwesterly along said avenue to Terry Fox Way; thence northwesterly along said way to Britannia Road West; thence northeasterly along said road to Mavis Road, southwest along Highway 401, northwest along Mississauga Road, northeast along the northwestern limit of the City of Mississauga, northwest along McLaughlin Road, northeast along Steeles Avenue East, southeast along Kennedy Road South, northeast along the northwestern limit of the City of Mississauga, southeast along Dixie Road, and northeast along Highway 401 to the point of commencement.

Following the 2012 federal electoral boundaries redistribution, the bulk of the district will be part of the new Mississauga—Malton district, with other parts transferred to Mississauga East—Cooksville, Mississauga Centre, Mississauga—Streetsville, Brampton South, and Brampton Centre.

== History ==
It was created in 2003 from Bramalea—Gore—Malton—Springdale, Brampton West—Mississauga, Mississauga Centre and Mississauga East ridings.

== Members of Parliament ==
This riding has elected the following members of the House of Commons of Canada:

Parliament	Years	Member	Party
Mississauga—Brampton South; Riding created from Bramalea—Gore—Malton—Springdale, Brampton West—Mississauga, Mississauga Centre and Mississauga East
38th	2004–2006	Navdeep Bains	Liberal
39th	2006–2008	Navdeep Bains	Liberal
40th	2008–2011	Navdeep Bains	Liberal
41st	2011–2015	Eve Adams	Conservative
41st	2015–2015	Eve Adams	Liberal
Riding dissolved into Mississauga—Malton, Mississauga—Streetsville, Mississauga East—Cooksville, Mississauga Centre, Brampton South and Brampton Centre

== Election results ==
2011 Canadian federal election
Party	Candidate	Votes	%	±%	Expenditures
Conservative	Eve Adams	23,632	44.72	+11.76	$ 90,006.33
Liberal	Navdeep Bains	18,579	35.16	−12.53	75,658.79
New Democratic	Jim Glavan	9,465	17.91	+6.07	
Green	Benjamin Stone	1,044	1.98	−4.64	16.14
Marxist–Leninist	Tim Sullivan	127	0.24	−0.65	
Total valid votes/expense limit		52,847	100.0	+18.77	$ 96,095.05
Total rejected ballots		351	0.66	−0.10	
Turnout		53,198	56.28	+6.89	
Eligible voters		94,531		+4.14	
Source(s) "Official Voting Results – Forty-First General Election 2011 — Table 12 – List of candidates by electoral district and individual results". Elections Canada. May 2, 2011. "Financial Reports: Candidate's Electoral Campaign Return". May 2, 2011.

2008 Canadian federal election
Party	Candidate	Votes	%	±%	Expenditures
Liberal	Navdeep Bains	21,220	47.69	-6.25	$ 65,107.35
Conservative	Salma Ataullahjan	14,664	32.96	+2.21	51,467.58
New Democratic	Karan Pandher	5,268	11.84	+0.96	5,832.24
Green	Grace Yogaretnam	2,947	6.62	+2.82	5,666.20
Marxist–Leninist	Tim Sullivan	395	0.89	+0.26	
Total valid votes/Expense limit		44,494	100.00	-12.31	$ 91,776.94
Total rejected ballots		343	0.76	+0.15	
Turnout		44,837	49.39	-10.62	
Eligible voters		90,777		+6.71	

2006 Canadian federal election
Party	Candidate	Votes	%	±%	Expenditures
Liberal	Navdeep Bains	27,370	53.94	-3.22	$ 80,611.34
Conservative	Arnjeet Sangha	15,605	30.75	+6.66	58,602.08
New Democratic	Nirvan Balkisoon	5,521	10.88	-3.92	9,470.07
Green	Grace Yogaretnam	1,927	3.80	+0.28	7,606.18
Marxist–Leninist	Tim Sullivan	319	0.63	+0.20	
Total valid votes/Expense limit		50,742	100.00	+17.17	$ 82,924.57
Total rejected ballots		310	0.61	-0.13	
Turnout		51,052	60.01	+6.17	
Eligible voters		85,068		+4.97	

2004 Canadian federal election
Party	Candidate	Votes	%	Expenditures
Liberal	Navdeep Bains	24,753	57.16	$ 70,830.08
Conservative	Parvinder Sandhu	10,433	24.09	64,050.50
New Democratic	Larry Taylor	6,411	14.80	14,516.24
Green	Paul Simas	1,525	3.52	
Marxist–Leninist	David Gershuny	185	0.43	23.48
Total valid votes/Expense limit		43,307	100.00	$ 78,421.35
Total rejected ballots		321	0.74	
Turnout		43,628	53.84	
Eligible voters		81,037		

== Proposed Redistribution of Electoral Districts ==
There is a proposal to change the electoral districts. If the proposal is adopted, the southern Burnhamthorpe boundary would change to Eglinton. This would mean that Rockwood Village would move from Mississauga—Brampton South to the Mississauga East—Cooksville Riding.

== See also ==
- List of Canadian federal electoral districts
- Historical federal electoral districts of Canada
