= Peter Fonseca =

Canadian politician

The Honourable Peter Fonseca MP ECO
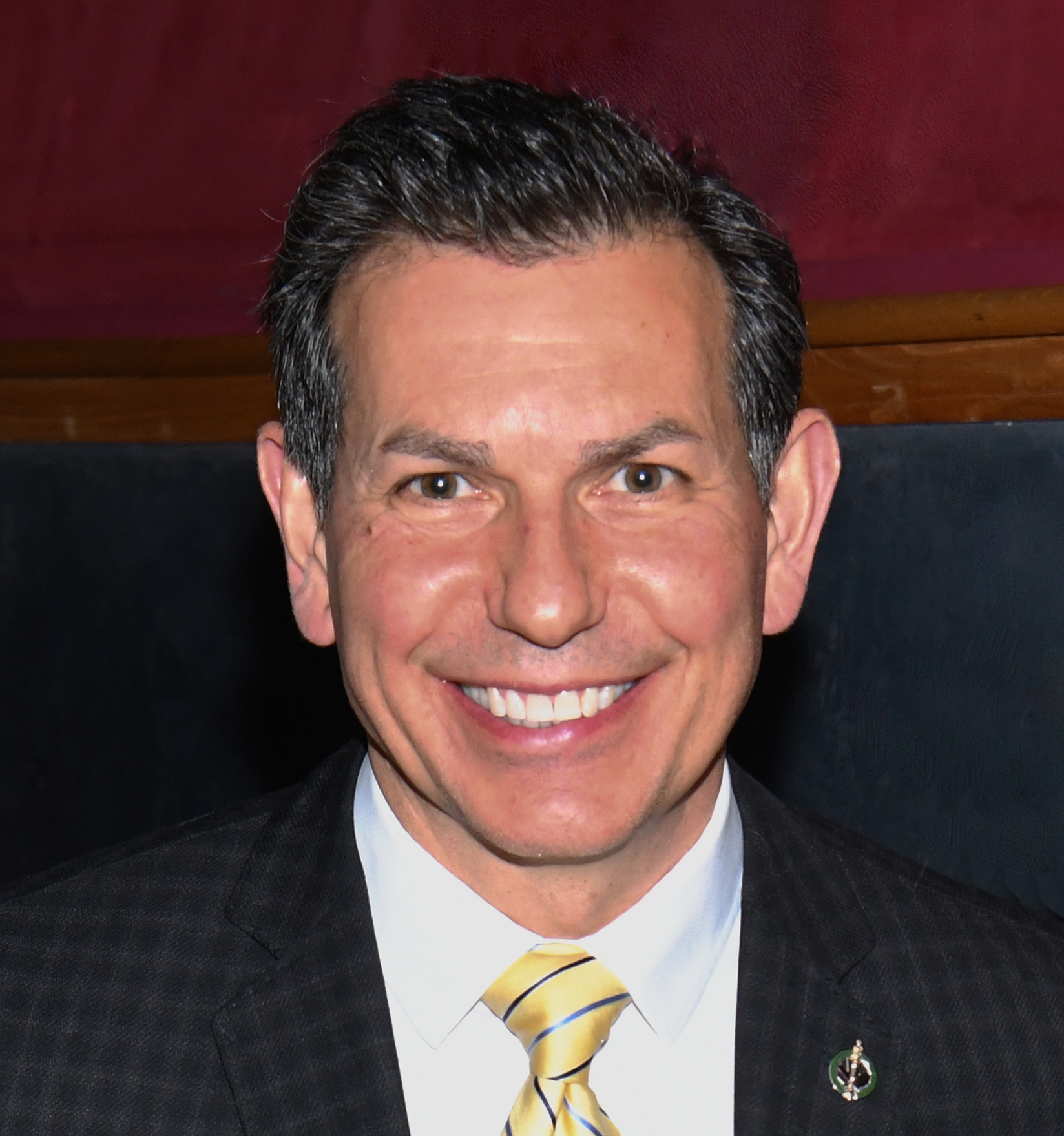

Member of Parliament for Mississauga East—Cooksville
- Incumbent
- Assumed office 19 October 2015
- Preceded by: Wladyslaw Lizon

Member of the Ontario Provincial Parliament for Mississauga East—Cooksville Mississauga East (2003-2007)
- In office 2 October 2003 – 26 March 2011
- Preceded by: Carl DeFaria
- Succeeded by: Dipika Damerla

Personal details
- Born: 5 October 1966 (age 60) Lisbon, Portugal
- Party: Liberal
- Other political affiliations: Ontario Liberal
- Spouse: Christine Fonseca (m. 2003)
- Education: University of Oregon, University of Windsor
- Occupation: Management consultant
- Website: peterfonseca.ca

For other people with a similar name, see Pedro da Fonseca (disambiguation)

Peter Fonseca MP (born 5 October 1966) is a Portuguese-born Canadian politician and former athlete. He is a Liberal member of the House of Commons of Canada, representing the riding of Mississauga East—Cooksville since his election in 2015.

Prior to entering federal politics, Fonseca was a provincial Liberal member of the Legislative Assembly of Ontario representing Mississauga East (2003-2007) and Mississauga East—Cooksville (2007- 2011). He was a cabinet minister in the government of Dalton McGuinty.

Fonseca was re-elected in his safe Liberal riding of Mississauga East—Cooksville with roughly 53% of the vote in the 2019 federal election and again with 50% of the vote in the 2021 federal election.

In the 44th parliament which was formed after the 2021 federal election (where the governing Liberals were re-elected with an increased minority), Fonseca was selected as the chair of the powerful Finance Committee.

== Background ==
Fonseca was born in Lisbon, Portugal and immigrated to Toronto with his family in 1968. He was raised in Little Portugal. He graduated from St. Michael's College School and attended the University of Oregon, gaining a Bachelor of Arts on an athletic scholarship. He also holds a Bachelor of Education degree from the University of Windsor. He worked as a senior performance management consultant for the Coach Corporation and has run an importing and distributing company in Portugal.

He married his wife Christine "Chris" Fonseca in 2003. Christine was elected to Mississauga City Council as Councillor for Ward 3 in the 2010 Mississauga municipal election and re-elected in 2014 Mississauga municipal election, 2018 Mississauga municipal election, and 2022 Mississauga municipal election.

Fonseca holds Dual-citizenship with Portugal.

== Athletic career ==
He finished 5th in the 10,000 metres at the 1994 Commonwealth Games. He also represented Canada at the 1996 Olympic Games in Atlanta, Georgia in the Men's Marathon. He was the top finisher for the Canadians, placing 21st overall in a 42.195-kilometre (26.219 mi) race with a time of 2 hours, 17 minutes and 28 seconds. He also placed second in the 1994 Toronto Marathon and the 1994 Houston Marathon, and third in the 1992 New York City Marathon and the 1990 Los Angeles Marathon.

Year	Competition	Venue	Position	Event	Notes
Representing Canada
1994	Houston Marathon	Houston, United States	2nd	Marathon	2:13:53
1994	Toronto Marathon	Toronto, Canada	2nd	Marathon	2:17:16
1994	Commonwealth Games	Victoria, Canada	5th	10,000 m	29:14.85
1995	Houston Marathon	Houston, United States	1st	Marathon	2:11:52
1996	Olympic Games	Atlanta, United States	21st	Marathon	2:17:28
1997	Toronto Marathon	Toronto, Canada	1st	Marathon	2:28:26

== Politics ==
=== Provincial ===
Fonseca was elected to the Ontario legislature in the provincial election of 2003, defeating incumbent Progressive Conservative Carl DeFaria by about 3,000 votes in Mississauga East. On 23 October 2003, he was named parliamentary assistant to George Smitherman, the Minister of Health and Long-Term Care. In July 2005, he became the parliamentary assistant to Jim Watson, the Minister of Health Promotion.

In October 2007, Fonseca was named to cabinet as Minister of Tourism and Recreation. In a cabinet shuffle on 18 September 2008, Fonseca was appointed as the province's Minister of Labour.

=== Federal ===
On 16 December 2010, Fonseca resigned from the Ontario cabinet to run for the federal Liberals in the riding of Mississauga East—Cooksville. He was defeated by Conservative candidate Wladyslaw Lizon in the 2011 federal election by 676 votes.

Fonseca ran for the Liberals again in the 2015 federal election and defeated Lizon by a wide margin as part of the Liberal sweep of Mississauga ridings. Fonseca was re-elected in the 2019 and 2021 elections.

Fonseca's constituency office was on fire, on 22 February 2022. Peel Regional Police is investigating the matter as arson.

== Electoral record ==
=== Federal ===
2025 Canadian federal election: Mississauga East—Cooksville
Party	Candidate	Votes	%	±%	Expenditures
Liberal	Peter Fonseca	27,138	50.20	–0.08	$119,366.85
Conservative	Nita Kang	24,112	44.61	+13.01	$107,165.88
New Democratic	Khawar Hussain	1,508	2.79	–7.71	$5,245.03
People's	Amit Gupta	964	1.78	–4.67	$5,418.03
Independent	Winston Harding	221	0.41	N/A	none listed
Marxist–Leninist	Dagmar Sullivan	113	0.21	–0.03	$0.00
Total valid votes/expense limit		54,056	98.88	–	$130,308.25
Total rejected ballots		610	1.12		
Turnout		54,666	64.04		
Eligible voters		85,360			
Liberal notional hold		Swing		–6.55	
Source: Elections Canada

2021 Canadian federal election: Mississauga East—Cooksville
Party	Candidate	Votes	%	±%	Expenditures
Liberal	Peter Fonseca	22,806	50.0	-3.1	$48,174.27
Conservative	Grace Adamu	14,722	32.3	-1.3	$16,774.32
New Democratic	Tom Takacs	4,678	10.3	+1.5	1,363.00
People's	Joseph Westover	2,933	6.4	+5.2	$809.98
Independent	Gord Elliott	329	0.7	N/A	$0.00
Marxist–Leninist	Dagmar Sullivan	107	0.2	-0.1	$0.00
Total valid votes/expense limit		45,575	99.2	–	$112,477.70
Total rejected ballots		383	0.8		
Turnout		45,958	55.6		
Eligible voters		82,603			
Liberal hold		Swing		-0.9	
Source: Elections Canada

2019 Canadian federal election: Mississauga East—Cooksville
Party	Candidate	Votes	%	±%	Expenditures
Liberal	Peter Fonseca	27,923	53.1	-1.13	$54,292.81
Conservative	Wladyslaw Lizon	17,664	33.6	-1.75	none listed
New Democratic	Tom Takacs	4,643	8.8	+0.17	none listed
Green	Maha Rasheed	1,578	3.0	+1.52	$0.00
People's	Syed Rizvi	637	1.2		$2,799.42
Marxist–Leninist	Anna Di Carlo	178	0.3	-0.01	$0.00
Total valid votes/expense limit		52,623	100.0		
Total rejected ballots		483			
Turnout		53,106	62.1		
Eligible voters		85,584			
Liberal hold		Swing		+0.31	
Source: Elections Canada

2015 Canadian federal election: Mississauga East—Cooksville
Party	Candidate	Votes	%	±%	Expenditures
Liberal	Peter Fonseca	28,154	54.23	+18.07	$85,296.75
Conservative	Wladyslaw Lizon	18,353	35.35	-8.20	$109,692.04
New Democratic	Ali Naqvi	4,481	8.63	-9.03	$34,143.24
Green	Jaymini Bhikha	766	1.48	-0.69	–
Marxist–Leninist	Tim Sullivan	163	0.31	–	–
Total valid votes/expense limit		51,917	100.00		$217,661.14
Total rejected ballots		287	0.55		
Turnout		52,204	63.87		
Eligible voters		81,736			
Liberal gain from Conservative		Swing		+13.13	
Source(s): "Mississaugs East--Cooksville". Election Results. Elections Canada.; Elections Canada – Preliminary Election Expenses Limits for Candidates

2011 Canadian federal election: Mississauga East—Cooksville
Party	Candidate	Votes	%	±%	Expenditures
Conservative	Wladyslaw Lizon	18,796	39.97	+7.42	$90,142
Liberal	Peter Fonseca	18,120	38.53	-11.63	$71,450
New Democratic	Waseem Ahmed	8,836	18.79	+7.44	$6,591
Green	Jaymini Bhikha	1,032	2.19	-3.05	$968
Marxist–Leninist	Pierre Chénier	241	0.51	-0.16	
Total valid votes/expense limit		47,025	100.00		$169,151
Total rejected ballots		289	0.61		
Turnout		47,314	56.8		
Eligible voters		83,018			
Conservative gain from Liberal		Swing		+9.52	
Source(s) Elections Canada (2011). "Official Voting Results: Forty-first General Election".

=== Provincial ===
2007 Ontario general election: Mississauga East—Cooksville
Party	Candidate	Votes	%
Liberal	Peter Fonseca	22,249	58.93
Progressive Conservative	Zoran Churchin	8,715	23.08
New Democratic	Satish Balasunderam	3,192	8.46
Green	Carla Casanova	2,361	6.25
Family Coalition	Al Zawadzki	992	2.63
Freedom	Ryan Jamieson	243	0.64
Total valid votes		37,752	99.08
Total rejected, unmarked and declined ballots		349	0.92
Turnout		38,101	47.48
Eligible voters		80,247	
Liberal pickup new district.			
Source: Elections Ontario

2003 Ontario general election: Mississauga East
Party	Candidate	Votes	%	±%
Liberal	Peter Fonseca	16,686	48.68	+9.69
Progressive Conservative	Carl DeFaria	13,832	40.35	–11.22
New Democratic	Michael Hancock	2,479	7.23	–0.01
Green	Donald Barber	666	1.94	–
Family Coalition	Gary Nail	358	1.04	–
Independent	Pierre Chénier	256	0.75	–0.62
Total valid votes		34,277	99.27	
Total rejected, unmarked and declined ballots		252	0.73	–0.45
Turnout		34,529	51.38	–1.46
Eligible voters		67,198		
Liberal gain from Progressive Conservative		Swing		+10.46
Source: Elections Ontario

McGuinty ministry, Province of Ontario (2003–2013)
Cabinet posts (2)
Predecessor	Office	Successor
Jim Bradley	Minister of Tourism and Recreation; 2008–2010	Monique Smith
Brad Duguid	Minister of Labour; 2007–2008	Charles Sousa
