= Pedro da Fonseca =

Pedro da Fonseca or Pedro Fonseca may refer to:

- Pedro da Fonseca (cardinal) (died 1422), Portuguese cardinal
- Pedro da Fonseca (philosopher) (1528–1599), Portuguese Jesuit philosopher and theologian
- Pedro Vicente Fonseca (born 1935), retired Brazilian basketball player
- Pedro Fonseca (footballer) (born 1997), Brazilian footballer

== See also ==
- Peter Fonseca (born 1966), Canadian politician
