= John Sola =

Canadian politician

Ontario MPP
- In office 1987–1995
- Preceded by: Bud Gregory
- Succeeded by: Carl DeFaria
- Constituency: Mississauga East

Personal details
- Born: Domagoj Ivan Šola; April 15, 1944 (age 82) Zagreb, Croatia
- Party: Liberal (1987–1993); Independent (1993–1995)

Domagoj Ivan "John" Šola (born April 15, 1944) is a former politician in Ontario, Canada. He served as a member of the Legislative Assembly of Ontario from 1987 to 1995. Originally a Liberal, he was forced to leave his party over controversy arising from his comments about Serbs.

== Background ==
Sola has a Bachelor of Arts degree from Laurentian University in Sudbury. In 1976-1977, he was the president of the Toronto Metro-Croatia soccer club.

== Politics ==
Sola was elected to the Ontario legislature in the 1987 provincial election, defeating Progressive Conservative incumbent Bud Gregory by almost 6,000 votes. The Liberal Party won a landslide majority government under the leadership of David Peterson, and Sola served as a backbench supporter of the Peterson government for the next three years.

The Liberals were defeated by the New Democratic Party in the 1990 provincial election, although Sola retained his seat by more than 3,000 votes against an NDP challenger. In opposition, he was appointed as the Liberal critic for the Chair of the Management Board of Cabinet.

Sola's political career ran into controversy in December 1991, shortly after the beginning of Yugoslavia's civil wars. He gave an interview with the television program the Fifth Estate about tensions between Canada's Serbian and Croatian communities. In the course of the interview, Sola said "I don't think I'd be able to live next door to a Serb".

In 1992, Sola was a supporter of Steve Mahoney during the leadership convention of the Ontario Liberal Party. After Mahoney was eliminated, Sola placed his support behind Lyn McLeod, the eventual winner.

Controversy followed Sola in 1993 when he was taped giving an address to students at York University. In his address he criticized Serbian-Canadians for not speaking out against atrocities being committed against Croats and Muslims during the Bosnian War, essentially declaring that by their silence they supported ethnic cleansing. Though Sola issued an apology in the Ontario Legislature, McLeod expelled Sola from the Ontario Liberal Party caucus on April 28, 1993.

Sola played only a minor role in the assembly after his expulsion from the Liberal Party, and did not seek re-election in 1995. After his defeat, Sola left provincial politics and was appointed Consul General of the Republic of Croatia in Chicago. His surname has also been referred to as Sladojević-Šola.
