= Bud Gregory (Canadian politician) =

Canadian politician

Ontario MPP
- In office 1975–1987
- Preceded by: New riding
- Succeeded by: John Sola
- Constituency: Mississauga East

Personal details
- Born: Milton Edward Charles Gregory; March 9, 1926 Toronto, Ontario
- Died: June 17, 2016 (aged 90) Picton, Ontario
- Party: Progressive Conservative
- Spouse: Shirley
- Children: 2
- Occupation: Insurance broker

Milton Edward Charles "Bud" Gregory (March 9, 1926 – June 17, 2016) was a Canadian politician in Ontario. He served as a Progressive Conservative member in the Legislative Assembly of Ontario who represented the riding of Mississauga East from 1975 to 1987. He served as a cabinet minister in the governments of Bill Davis and Frank Miller.

== Background ==
Gregory was born in Toronto and educated at Western Technical-Commercial School. He worked as an insurance broker.

== Politics ==
Gregory was a councillor in Mississauga from 1971 to 1975, and in the County of Peel from 1972 to 1973, and in the Regional Municipality of Peel from 1974 to 1975.

He was elected to the Ontario legislature in the 1975 provincial election, defeating Liberal candidate Irene Robinson by 1,335 votes in Mississauga East. He defeated Robinson again with an increased majority in the 1977 election, and was named a minister without portfolio in Bill Davis's government on August 30, 1979. Easily returned in the 1981 election, he was named Chief Government Whip on April 10, 1981. On July 6, 1983, he was promoted to Minister of Revenue.

Gregory supported Frank Miller in the Progressive Conservative Party's January 1985 leadership convention, but was dropped from cabinet when Miller succeeded Davis as Premier of Ontario on February 8, 1985. He was re-elected with a reduced majority in the 1985 election as the Progressive Conservatives under Miller were reduced to a tenuous minority government. He was re-appointed to cabinet on May 17, 1985 as Solicitor General, but accomplished little in this portfolio before the Miller government was defeated in the legislature. In opposition, he served as critic for the Solicitor General and for Transportation and Communications. He was defeated in the 1987 election, losing to Liberal candidate John Sola by 5,873 votes.

=== Cabinet ===
Miller ministry, Province of Ontario (1985)
Cabinet post (1)
Predecessor	Office	Successor
John Williams	Solicitor General; 1985 (May–June)	Ken Keyes
Davis ministry, Province of Ontario (1971–1985)
Cabinet posts (2)
Predecessor	Office	Successor
George Ashe	Minister of Revenue; 1983–1985	Gordon Howlett Dean
Sub-Cabinet Post
Predecessor	Title	Successor
	Minister without portfolio (1979–1983)	
Special Parliamentary Responsibilities
Predecessor	Title	Successor
Douglas Kennedy	Chief Government Whip; 1981-1983	Bob Eaton

== Later life ==
Gregory was appointed to the County of Prince Edward Police Services Board in 2001. Bud Gregory Boulevard, in Mississauga, was named in Gregory's honour. On June 17, 2016, he died in Picton, Ontario at the age of 90.
