= Carl DeFaria =

Canadian politician

The Honourable Carl DeFaria ECO

Ontario MPP
- In office 1995–2003
- Preceded by: John Sola
- Succeeded by: Peter Fonseca
- Constituency: Mississauga East

Personal details
- Born: 1949 (age 76–77)
- Party: Progressive Conservative
- Spouse: Riina DeFaria
- Occupation: Lawyer

Carl DeFaria (born c. 1949) is a politician in Ontario, Canada. He was a Progressive Conservative member of the Legislative Assembly of Ontario from 1995 to 2003 and was a cabinet minister in the government of Ernie Eves.

== Background ==
DeFaria has a Bachelor of Arts degree from the University of Toronto and a law degree from Osgoode Hall. He worked in criminal and constitutional law before entering political life. DeFaria was also an instructor of the Bar Admission Course for the Law Society of Upper Canada. His wife, Riina DeFaria, has also campaigned for the House of Commons of Canada on two occasions.

== Politics ==
He ran for the Ontario legislature in the provincial election of 1990, as the Tory candidate in the working-class riding of Cambridge. He finished a distant third, behind prominent New Democrat Mike Farnan and a Liberal candidate.

DeFaria then ran for the federal Progressive Conservative Party in the federal election of 1993 in Mississauga East, placing a distant third, this time behind Liberal Albina Guarnieri and a Reform Party candidate.

He was elected in Mississauga East by more than 6,000 votes over his Liberal opponent in the provincial election of 1995, amid a Tory sweep of the Mississauga region. A moderate, DeFaria remained a backbencher during the Progressive Conservative government of Mike Harris.

DeFaria was re-elected in the provincial election of 1999, defeating his Liberal opponent by more than 4,000 votes. He supported Ernie Eves to succeed Harris as party leader in 2002, and was named Minister of Citizenship with responsibility for Seniors on April 15, 2002.

In late 2002, he was criticized by some for issuing a pamphlet of Christmas songs entitled "Sing Along With Carl". One of the works was a Stephen Foster song from 1851, which referred to blacks as "darkies". DeFaria quickly apologized, claiming that he had not scrutinized the pamphlet carefully enough before its release.

In the provincial election of 2003, he lost to Liberal candidate Peter Fonseca (a well-known Olympic athlete) by about 3,000 votes, amid a general regional decline in Tory support.

== Later life ==
He ran for the Mississauga South federal Conservative nomination in 2004, losing to Phil Green.

In 2005, DeFaria was appointed director of the Serious Crimes Unit by Timorese President Xanana Gusmão. His task was to windup war crimes probes before the UN pullout on May 20, 2005. He faced some criticism that the UN was leaving before the war crime trial process was finished. He said, "Obviously, we would like to have all of the people who have been indicted brought to justice. It will be up to the Timorese government. I'm sure if they decide to pursue it, they will have a lot of support from the international community."

In the 2006 federal election, DeFaria ran for the Conservative Party of Canada, finishing second to longtime Liberal incumbent Albina Guarnieri.

== Electoral record (incomplete) ==
1993 Canadian federal election: Mississauga East
Party	Candidate	Votes	%	±%
Liberal	Albina Guarnieri (incumbent)	32,167	63.84	
Reform	Peter Zathey	9,473	18.80	
Progressive Conservative	Carl DeFaria	6,427	12.76	
New Democratic	John Jackson	1,382	2.74	
National	Michael Patrick Curran	393	0.78	
Natural Law	Geraldine Jackson	323	0.64	
Independent	Adrienne Earl Crewson	148	0.29	
Marxist–Leninist	Yvon Turgeon	73	0.14	
Total valid votes		50,386	100.00	
Source: Parliament of Canada.

Eves ministry, Province of Ontario (2002–2003)
Cabinet post (1)
Predecessor	Office	Successor
Cam Jackson	Minister of Citizenship; 2002–2003; Also Responsible for Senior Citizens	Marie Bountrogianni
