= Mississauga—Malton (federal electoral district) =

Federal electoral district in Ontario, Canada

Coordinates: 43.655°N 79.660°W

Ontario electoral district
- Interactive map of riding boundaries from the 2025 federal election

Federal electoral district
- Legislature: House of Commons
MP
Iqwinder Gaheer
Liberal
- District created: 2013
- First contested: 2015
- Last contested: 2025
- District webpage: profile, map

Demographics
- Population (2016): 118,240
- Electors (2015): 73,591
- Area (km²): 102
- Pop. density (per km²): 1,159.2
- Census division: Peel
- Census subdivision: Mississauga

Mississauga—Malton is a federal electoral district in Ontario. It encompasses a portion of Ontario previously included in the electoral districts of Bramalea—Gore—Malton, Mississauga—Brampton South and Mississauga—Streetsville.

Mississauga—Malton was created by the 2012 federal electoral boundaries redistribution and was legally defined in the 2013 representation order. It came into effect upon the call of the 42nd Canadian federal election, scheduled for October 2015.

== Demographics ==
According to the 2021 Canadian census

Ethnic groups: 42.8% South Asian, 18.4% White, 11.0% Black, 5.6% Chinese, 5.5% Filipino, 3.8% Arab, 3.6% Southeast Asian, 2.1% Latin American, 1.0% West Asian

Languages: 39.0% English, 10.2% Punjabi, 5.8% Urdu, 2.8% Arabic, 2.8% Tagalog, 2.6% Hindi, 2.4% Vietnamese, 2.4% Tamil, 2.3% Gujarati, 2.1% Cantonese, 2.0% Mandarin, 1.7% Spanish, 1.6% Italian, 1.5% Portuguese, 1.5% Polish

Religions: 40.2% Christian (23.6% Catholic, 2.0% Christian Orthodox, 1.8% Pentecostal, 1.0% Anglican, 11.8% Other), 17.1% Muslim, 14.8% Hindu, 12.0% Sikh, 2.9% Buddhist, 12.3% None

Median income: $34,800 (2020)

Average income: $44,920 (2020)

== Riding associations ==
Riding associations are the local branches of political parties:

Party	Association name	CEO	HQ City
Conservative	Mississauga--Malton Conservative Association	Caroline Roach	Mississauga
Liberal	Mississauga--Malton Federal Liberal Association	Balkar S. Bains	Brampton

== Members of Parliament ==
This riding has elected the following members of Parliament:

Parliament	Years	Member	Party
Mississauga—Malton; Riding created from Bramalea—Gore—Malton, Mississauga—Brampton South and Mississauga—Streetsville
42nd	2015–2019	Navdeep Bains	Liberal
43rd	2019–2021	Navdeep Bains	Liberal
44th	2021–2025	Iqwinder Gaheer	Liberal
45th	2025–present	Iqwinder Gaheer	Liberal

== Election results ==
View source data.
Graph of election results in Mississauga—Malton (minor parties that never got 2% of the vote or didn't run consistently are omitted)

2025 Canadian federal election
Party	Candidate	Votes	%	±%	Expenditures
Liberal	Iqwinder Singh Gaheer	26,793	53.30	+0.62	$89,091.36
Conservative	Jaspreet Sandhu	21,202	42.18	+11.39	$78,604.04
New Democratic	Inderjeetsingh Ailsinghani	1,290	2.57	–11.17	$115.84
People's	Nathan Quinlan	983	1.96	+1.66	$1,867.25
Total valid votes/expense limit		50,654	99.24	–	$128,303.72
Total rejected ballots		386	0.76		
Turnout		51,040	62.34		
Eligible voters		81,871			
Liberal notional hold		Swing		–5.39	
Source: Elections Canada

2021 federal election redistributed results
Party	Vote	%
Liberal	22,659	52.68
Conservative	13,244	30.79
New Democratic	5,912	13.74
Green	801	1.86
People's	129	0.30
Others	271	0.63

2021 Canadian federal election
Party	Candidate	Votes	%	±%	Expenditures
Liberal	Iqwinder Gaheer	21,766	52.8	-4.7	$75,599.65
Conservative	Clyde Roach	12,625	30.6	+4.8	$36,598.37
New Democratic	Waseem Ahmed	5,771	14.0	+1.4	$36,233.25
Green	Mark Davidson	811	2.0	-0.6	$0.00
Marxist–Leninist	Frank Chilelli	275	0.7	+0.5	$0.00
Total valid votes/expense limit		41,248	–	–	$109,482.72
Total rejected ballots		435			
Turnout		41,683	54.1		
Eligible voters		77,095			
Liberal hold		Swing		-4.7	
Source: Elections Canada

2019 Canadian federal election
Party	Candidate	Votes	%	±%	Expenditures
Liberal	Navdeep Bains	27,890	57.5	-1.62	$76,024.88
Conservative	Tom Varughese	12,528	25.8	-0.64	$86,705.72
New Democratic	Nikki Clarke	6,103	12.6	+0.29	$12,952.47
Green	Christina Porter	1,251	2.6	+0.93	$4.98
People's	Tahir Gora	369	0.8		none listed
United	Prudence Buchanan	306	0.6		$0.00
Marxist–Leninist	Frank Chilelli	90	0.2		$0.00
Total valid votes/expense limit		48,537	100.0		
Total rejected ballots		500			
Turnout		49,037	62.0		
Eligible voters		79,034			
Liberal hold		Swing		-0.49	
Source: Elections Canada

2015 Canadian federal election
Party	Candidate	Votes	%	±%	Expenditures
Liberal	Navdeep Bains	26,165	59.12	+22.33	$103,144.90
Conservative	Jagdish Grewal	11,701	26.44	-11.00	$126,893.52
New Democratic	Dianne Douglas	5,450	12.31	-11.12	$5,226.05
Green	Heather Mercer	737	1.67	-0.37	–
Independent	Naresh Tharani	210	0.46	–	$8,153.79
Total valid votes/expense limit		44,256	100.00		$207,082.35
Total rejected ballots		237	0.53	–	
Turnout		44,493	59.76	–	
Eligible voters		74,448			
Liberal notional gain from Conservative		Swing		+16.67	
Source: Elections Canada

2011 federal election redistributed results
Party	Vote	%
Conservative	13,715	37.44
Liberal	13,477	36.79
New Democratic	8,584	23.43
Green	744	2.03
Others	113	0.31

== See also ==
- List of Canadian electoral districts
- Historical federal electoral districts of Canada
- Mississauga—Malton (provincial electoral district)
