= Mississauga East (provincial electoral district) =

Ontario electoral district

Defunct provincial electoral district
- Legislature: Legislative Assembly of Ontario
- District created: 1975
- District abolished: 2007

Mississauga East was a provincial electoral district in Ontario, Canada, that was represented in the Legislative Assembly of Ontario from 1975 to 2007. It was located in the city of Mississauga.

The electoral district was abolished in 2003 when it was re-distributed into the ridings of Mississauga East—Cooksville, Mississauga South, and Mississauga—Brampton South.

== Members of Provincial Parliament ==
Mississauga East
Assembly	Years	Member	Party
Riding created
30th	1975–1977	Bud Gregory	Progressive Conservative
31st	1977–1981	Bud Gregory	Progressive Conservative
32nd	1981–1985	Bud Gregory	Progressive Conservative
33rd	1985–1987	Bud Gregory	Progressive Conservative
34th	1987–1990	John Sola	Liberal
35th	1990–1995	John Sola	Liberal
36th	1995–1999	Carl DeFaria	Progressive Conservative
37th	1999–2003	Carl DeFaria	Progressive Conservative
38th	2003–2007	Peter Fonseca	Liberal
Riding dissolved into Mississauga East—Cooksville, Mississauga South and Mississauga—Brampton South

== Provincial election results ==
2003 Ontario general election
Party	Candidate	Votes	%	±%
Liberal	Peter Fonseca	16,686	48.68	+9.69
Progressive Conservative	Carl DeFaria	13,832	40.35	–11.22
New Democratic	Michael Hancock	2,479	7.23	–0.01
Green	Donald Barber	666	1.94	–
Family Coalition	Gary Nail	358	1.04	–
Independent	Pierre Chénier	256	0.75	–0.62
Total valid votes		34,277	99.27	
Total rejected, unmarked and declined ballots		252	0.73	–0.45
Turnout		34,529	51.38	–1.46
Eligible voters		67,198		
Liberal gain from Progressive Conservative		Swing		+10.46
Source: Elections Ontario

1999 Ontario general election
Party	Candidate	Votes	%	±%
Progressive Conservative	Carl DeFaria	17,688	51.58	–0.49
Liberal	Shan Padda	13,371	38.99	+7.25
New Democratic	James Kafieh	2,484	7.24	–8.95
Independent	Pierre Chénier	469	1.37	–
Natural Law	Greg Mytron	282	0.82	–
Total valid votes		34,294	98.82	
Total rejected, unmarked and declined ballots		409	1.18	–0.28
Turnout		34,703	52.85	–7.53
Eligible voters		65,666		
Progressive Conservative hold		Swing		–3.87
Source: Elections Ontario

1995 Ontario general election
Party	Candidate	Votes	%	±%
Progressive Conservative	Carl DeFaria	16,468	52.07	+25.92
Liberal	Konstantine Katsoulis	10,039	31.74	–7.55
New Democratic	Zenia Wadhwani	5,120	16.19	–12.78
Total valid votes		31,627	98.54	
Total rejected, unmarked and declined ballots		468	1.46	–0.28
Turnout		32,095	60.38	–1.24
Eligible voters		53,159		
Progressive Conservative gain from Liberal		Swing		+19.35
Source: Elections Ontario

1990 Ontario general election
Party	Candidate	Votes	%	±%
Liberal	John Sola	12,448	39.29	–11.10
New Democratic	Mike Crone	9,177	28.96	+13.88
Progressive Conservative	Brad Butt	8,285	26.15	–6.02
Independent	Peter Sesek	1,363	4.30	–
Freedom	Chris Balabanian	411	1.30	–1.06
Total valid votes		31,684	98.27	
Total rejected, unmarked and declined ballots		559	1.73	+1.22
Turnout		32,243	61.61	+1.83
Eligible voters		52,332		
Liberal hold		Swing		–12.49
Source: Elections Ontario

1987 Ontario general election
Party	Candidate	Votes	%	±%
Liberal	John Sola	16,245	50.38	+18.96
Progressive Conservative	Bud Gregory	10,372	32.17	–5.79
New Democratic	Sal Manni	4,864	15.09	–15.53
Freedom	Bill Frampton	761	2.36	–
Total valid votes		32,242	99.49	
Total rejected ballots		166	0.51	–0.01
Turnout		32,408	59.78	+2.35
Eligible voters		54,212		
Liberal gain from Progressive Conservative		Swing		+12.38
Source: Elections Ontario

1985 Ontario general election
Party	Candidate	Votes	%	±%
Progressive Conservative	Bud Gregory	14,900	37.96	–17.71
Liberal	Victor Maida	12,334	31.43	+4.16
New Democratic	Larry Taylor	12,015	30.61	+13.55
Total valid votes		39,249	99.48	
Total rejected ballots		205	0.52	+0.05
Turnout		39,454	57.43	+7.34
Eligible voters		68,703		
Progressive Conservative hold		Swing		–10.94
Source: Elections Ontario

1981 Ontario general election
Party	Candidate	Votes	%	±%
Progressive Conservative	Bud Gregory	15,759	55.68	+10.42
Liberal	Murray Schelter	7,716	27.26	–4.78
New Democratic	Doug Bennett	4,829	17.06	–5.65
Total valid votes		28,304	99.53	
Total rejected ballots		134	0.47	+0.07
Turnout		28,438	50.08	–10.02
Eligible voters		56,781		
Progressive Conservative hold		Swing		+7.60
Source: Elections Ontario

1977 Ontario general election
Party	Candidate	Votes	%	±%
Progressive Conservative	Bud Gregory	11,945	45.25	+6.21
Liberal	Irene Robinson	8,456	32.04	–1.78
New Democratic	Neil Davis	5,994	22.71	–2.74
Total valid votes		26,395	99.60	
Total rejected ballots		106	0.40	+0.06
Turnout		26,501	60.11	–4.78
Eligible voters		44,089		
Progressive Conservative hold		Swing		+4.00
Source: Elections Ontario

1975 Ontario general election
Party	Candidate	Votes	%
Progressive Conservative	Bud Gregory	9,973	39.05
Liberal	Irene Robinson	8,638	33.82
New Democratic	Larry Taylor	6,499	25.44
Independent	Edmond Meyers	432	1.69
Total valid votes		25,542	99.66
Total rejected ballots		87	0.34
Turnout		25,629	64.88
Eligible voters		39,500	
Progressive Conservative pickup new district.			
Source: Elections Ontario

== See also ==
- List of Ontario provincial electoral districts
- Canadian provincial electoral districts
