= Rockwood Village =

Coordinates: 43°36′48.7″N 80°08′11.9″W

- Neighbourhood
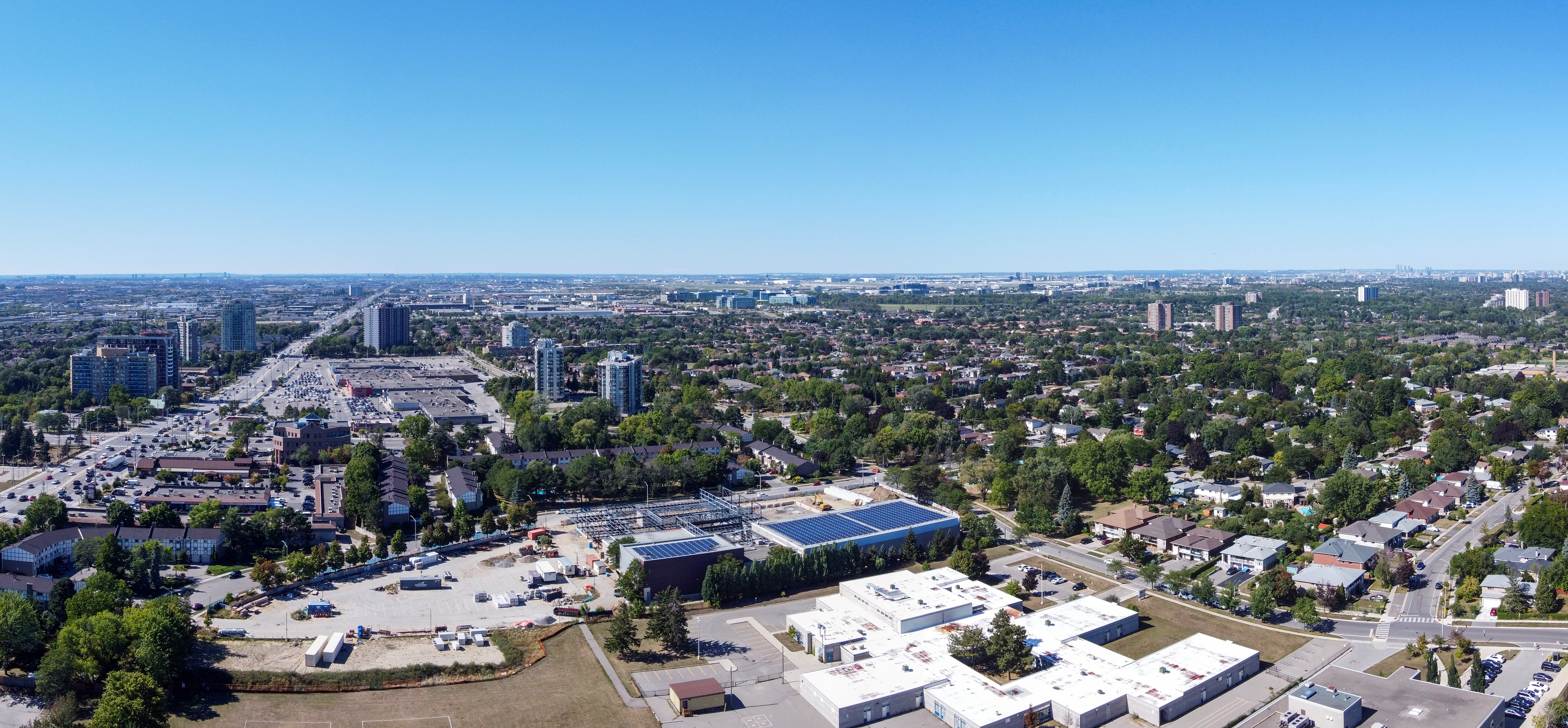
- Aerial view of Rockwood Village
- Interactive map of Rockwood Village
- Country: Canada
- Province: Ontario
- Regional Municipality: Peel
- City: Mississauga
- Established: 1960s as subdivision

Government
  - MP: Peter Fonseca (Mississauga East—Cooksville)
  - MPP: Silvia Gualtieri (Mississauga East—Cooksville)
  - Councillors: Chris Fonseca (Ward 3)
- Postal code: L4W

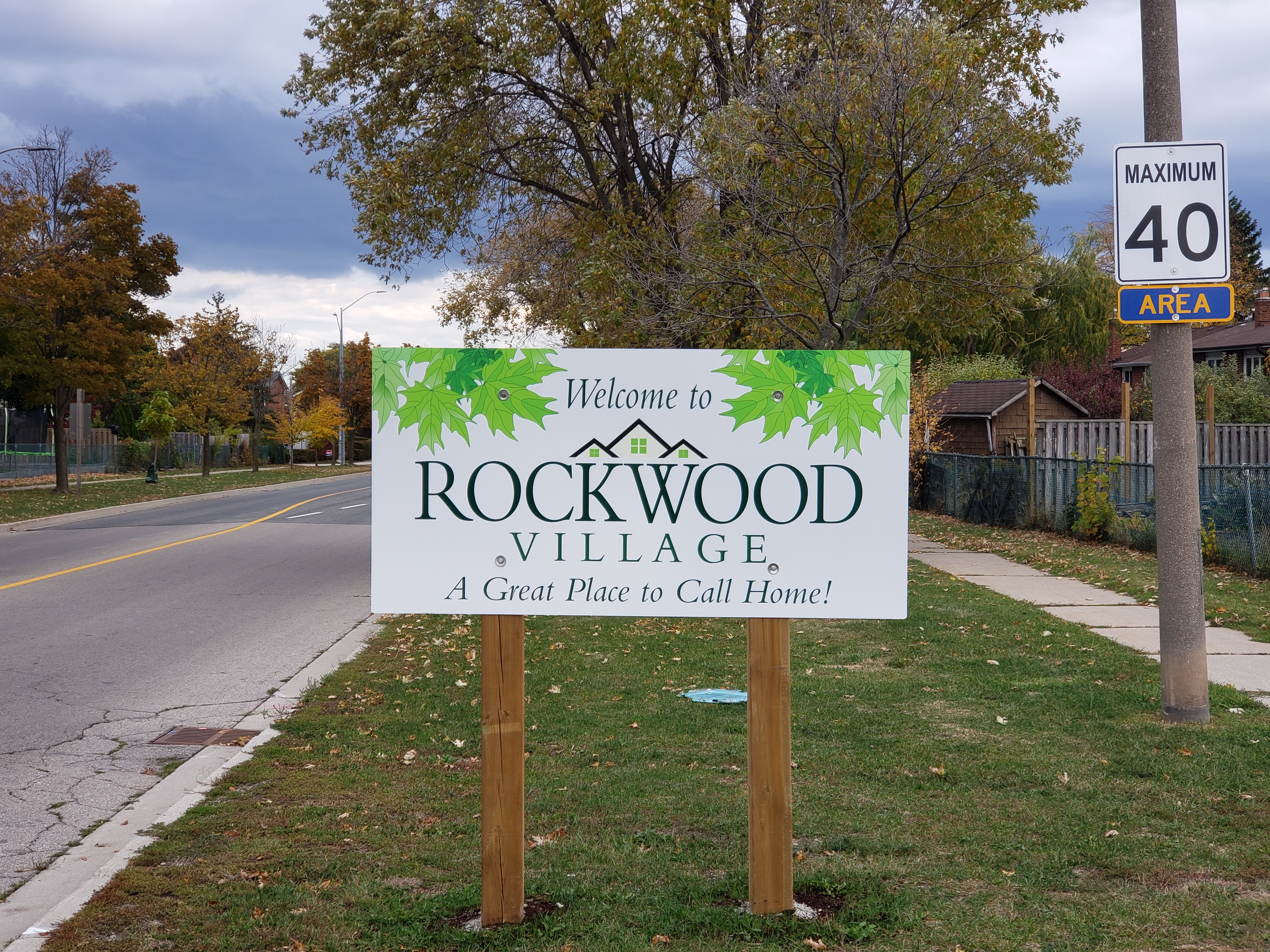
Rockwood Village entrance sign

Rockwood Village is a neighbourhood in the eastern part of the City of Mississauga, Ontario, Canada, in the Regional Municipality of Peel. Its approximate boundaries are Eglinton Avenue in the north, Burnhamthorpe Road in the south, the Etobicoke Creek (the city limits of Mississauga) on the east and Dixie Road on the west. The Municipal Ward is Ward 3, the provincial riding is Mississauga East—Cooksville and the federal riding is Mississauga East—Cooksville. The Burnhamthorpe branch of the Mississauga Library System is located at the southwestern edge of Rockwood Village at the corner of Burnhamthorpe Road and Dixie Road.

== History ==
The historic hamlet of Burnhamthorpe was located at the corner of today's Burnhamthorpe Road and Dixie Road, at the southwestern edge of the neighbourhood. The area took in part of Lots 5 and 6, Concessions 1 and 2, NDS (North of Dundas Street). Founded about 1820, it was originally named Sandy Hill, but when a post office opened in 1862, a post office conflict with Sandhill in Chinguacousy Township occurred, so it was renamed Burnhamthorpe at the suggestion of John Abelson who hailed from Burnham Thorpe, England.

When surveyor Samuel Wilmot laid out the roadways in the 1805 Purchase survey, concessions ran east-west and lines ran north-south. Third Line East became Dixie Road, and Back Line Road and Lower Base Line (the latter named as such because it was the boundary between the old and new township surveys) became Burnhamthorpe Road and Eglinton Avenue respectively.

The 1877 Peel Atlas shows Samuel Moore Lot 6, Concession 2 (100 acres) on the Northwest Corner of modern-day Dixie Road and Burnhamthorpe Road. George Chadwick has Lot 5, Concession 2 on the Northeast corner, William Shaver has Lot 6, Concession 1 on the Southwest corner and William Clarkson has Lot 5, Concession 1 on the Southeast corner. 1877 Peel Atlas:

List of Burnhamthorpe properties in 1877 in the area that became Rockwood Village:

Concession, NDS, Lot, Acreage	1877 Owner	Notes	Modern Rockwood streets/uses
Concession 2 NDS, Lot 1, 150 Acres (NDS = North of Dundas Street)	Francis William Shaver	Post Office – Burnhamthorpe	Marblethorne Crt, Garnetwood Chase, Garrowhill Trail, Palisades, part of Rathburn & Bough Beeches & Carscadden & Beechknoll, Garnetwood Park, part of River Millway & Tapestry Trail
Concession 2 NDS, Lot 2, 100 Acres	Mrs. Elizabeth Coates	Post Office – Burnhamthorpe	part of Carscadden & Beechknoll & Claypine Rise
Concession 2 NDS, Lot 2, 100 Acres	Estate of J. Wadsworth	Township – Toronto South	Ponytrail Dr, part of Claypine Rise, Mahogany Row,
Concession 2 NDS, Lot 3, 200 Acres	Dr. Moses H. Aikens (Aikins)	Doctor of Medicine	Fieldgate Drive, Tahoe Blvd, Buckhorn Gate, Audubon, Chalkdene Grove, Saltdene Terrace, Branchwood Park, Rowntree Crt,
Concession 2 NDS, Lot 4, 200 Acres	Charles Doherty	Post Office – Britannia	Eastgate Parkway, Lewes Way, part of Maple Ridge, Corkstone Glade, Copesholm Trail, Rockwood Road, Anworld Place,
Concession 2 NDS, Lot 5, 50 Acres	Robert Currie	Post Office – Burnhamthorpe	Ottewell Cres, Hartfield Grove, Grazia Crt,
Concession 2 NDS, Lot 5, 50 Acres	George Chadwick	Post Office – Burnhamthorpe	Esso Gas Station, Rockwood Mall, part of Bough Beeches Blvd, Poltava Cres
Concession 2 NDS, Lot 5, 100 Acres	Allen Craig	Farmer and Stock Raiser – Settled 1845	Eastgate Parkway, Post Office

The name Rockwood Village was coined as the area was planned and developed in the 1960s and 1970s.

== Rockwood Homeowners' Association ==
The Rockwood Homeowners' Association is a community group composed of homeowners living within the Rockwood Village. The Association was founded in 1997 and is focused on resolving community issues and improving resident living. The Rockwood Homeowners' Association provides residents with information on community living and events through the publishing of their quarterly newsletter, The Rockwood Times. The newsletter is published by the Rockwood Homeowners' Association board members and is provided to all residents living within the Rockwood Village. The Rockwood Homeowners' Association holds an Annual General Meeting for all community members to attend.
