= Navdeep Bains =

Canadian politician (born 1977)

The Honourable Navdeep Bains PC FCPA
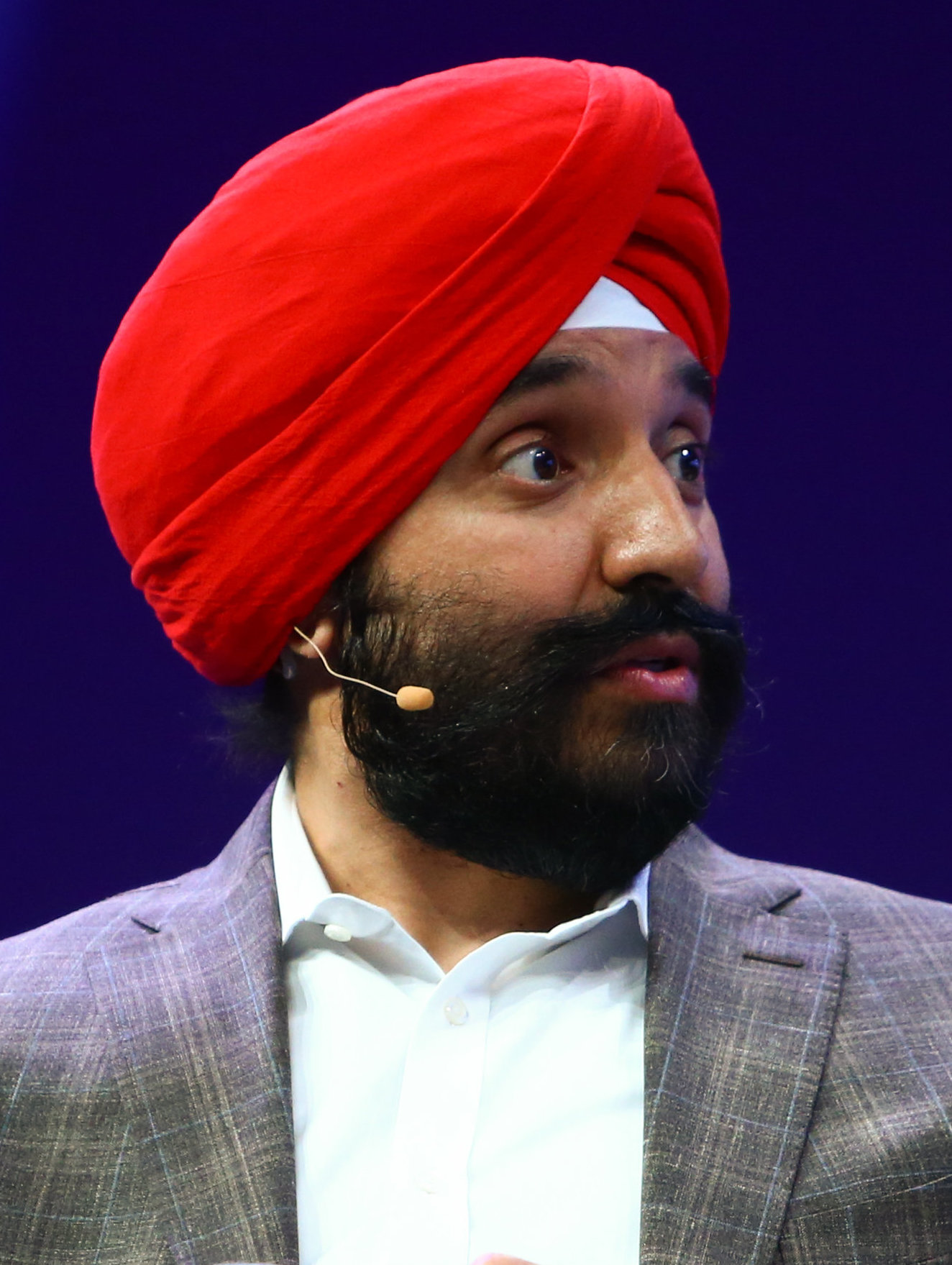

Leader of the Ontario Liberal Party
- Incumbent
- Assumed office November 21, 2026
- Preceded by: John Fraser (Interim)

Minister of Innovation, Science and Industry Registrar General of Canada
- In office November 4, 2015 – January 12, 2021
- Prime Minister: Justin Trudeau
- Preceded by: James Moore
- Succeeded by: François-Philipe Champagne

Member of Parliament for Mississauga—Malton
- In office October 19, 2015 – September 20, 2021
- Preceded by: Constituency established
- Succeeded by: Iqwinder Gaheer

Member of Parliament for Mississauga—Brampton South
- In office June 28, 2004 – May 2, 2011
- Preceded by: Constituency established
- Succeeded by: Eve Adams

Parliamentary Secretary to the Prime Minister of Canada
- In office October 7, 2005 – November 29, 2005
- Prime Minister: Paul Martin
- Preceded by: Paul DeVillers
- Succeeded by: Jason Kenney

Personal details
- Born: Navdeep Singh Bains; June 16, 1977 (age 49) Toronto, Ontario, Canada
- Party: Liberal (federal); Ontario Liberal (provincial)
- Spouse: Brahamjot Bains
- Children: 2
- Education: Turner Fenton Secondary School
- Alma mater: York University (BAS); University of Windsor (MBA)
- Profession: Accountant, politician, business executive, academic, financial analyst and investment banker
- Website: www.navdeepbains.ca

Navdeep Singh Bains (born June 16, 1977) is a Canadian politician and business executive who has served as leader of the Ontario Liberal Party since November 2026, and was previously the minister of innovation, science and industry from 2015 to 2021. A member of the federal Liberal Party, Bains was the member of Parliament (MP) for Mississauga—Brampton South from 2004 to 2011, and MP for Mississauga—Malton from 2015 to 2021. He was Parliamentary Secretary to Prime Minister Paul Martin in 2005 and appointed to Cabinet by Prime Minister Justin Trudeau in 2015. After leaving federal politics in 2021, Bains joined CIBC in September 2021 and then Rogers Communications in May 2023. He was elected leader in the 2026 Ontario Liberal Party leadership election.

== Early life, education and early career ==
Bains was born in Toronto, Ontario, on June 16, 1977, to Sikh parents, Harminder and Balwinder Bains. His family has origins in two villages, Lehli Kalan and Mahilpur, in District Hoshiarpur, Punjab. His grandfather later moved to Village Chak no 12PS, Tehsil Raisinghnagar, district Sri Ganganagar and later they immigrated to Canada.

Bains graduated from Turner Fenton Secondary School in Brampton, while it was known as J. A. Turner Secondary School and Turner Fenton Campus. After completing high school, Bains attended York University, where he received his Bachelor of Administrative Studies. He then went on to finish his Masters in Business Administration from the University of Windsor. He received his Certified Management Accountant designation, subsequently becoming a Chartered Professional Accountant in 2014. In 2016, he was awarded the prestigious FCPA designation by CPA Ontario for his "outstanding achievements including community leadership".

Before joining electoral politics, Bains worked as a financial processing analyst at Nike Canada from 2000 to 2001. He also worked for the Ford Motor Company as a revenue and costing analyst from 2000 until 2004.

== Political career ==
=== Federal politics (2004–2021) ===
==== In government ====
In his first election in 2004, Bains won the Liberal nomination for the riding of Mississauga—Brampton South, and won the seat with over 57% of the total vote; beating his next nearest opponent by over 33%, or over 14,000 votes. At that time, Bains was 26 years old and the youngest Liberal MP in Parliament.

On October 7, 2005, when he became parliamentary secretary to the prime minister, which at the time was Paul Martin. As parliamentary secretary to the prime minister, Bains was sworn in as a member of the Privy Council.

==== In opposition ====
In 2006, Bains was re-elected in his riding with just under 54% of the vote.

Also in 2006, Bains co-chaired the Liberal Party of Canada (Ontario)'s annual general meeting Toronto.

During the 2006 Liberal leadership convention to replace Paul Martin, Bains threw his support behind Ontario Education Minister Gerard Kennedy, and after Kennedy dropped out before the third ballot, he joined Kennedy in supporting the eventual winner and new party leader, Stéphane Dion.

In the 39th Parliament, Bains held Official Opposition critic portfolios for Public Works and Government Services, the Treasury Board and International Trade, respectively. Bains was also member of the Liberal Caucus Committees for Planning and Priorities, Canada and the World and Economic Prosperity. In January 2007, he was appointed to the National Election Readiness Committee as a Caucus Representative and in March 2007 served as the Youth Liaison to the Young Liberals of Canada.

In January 2009, he was selected by Michael Ignatieff along with Steve MacKinnon to serve as Co-Chairs of the Special Committee on Party Renewal and tasked with heading a consultation process with the party membership on how to strengthen the party. In March 2009, Bains was appointed Chair of Platform Development and oversaw the creation of the party's next electoral platform. As part of his recommendations for party renewal, delegates at the 2009 Liberal leadership election voted to ensure that all future leadership elections would be under a "weighted one member, one vote" system, where each riding has 100 points that are distributed to leadership candidates based on the percentage of votes from party members in that riding.

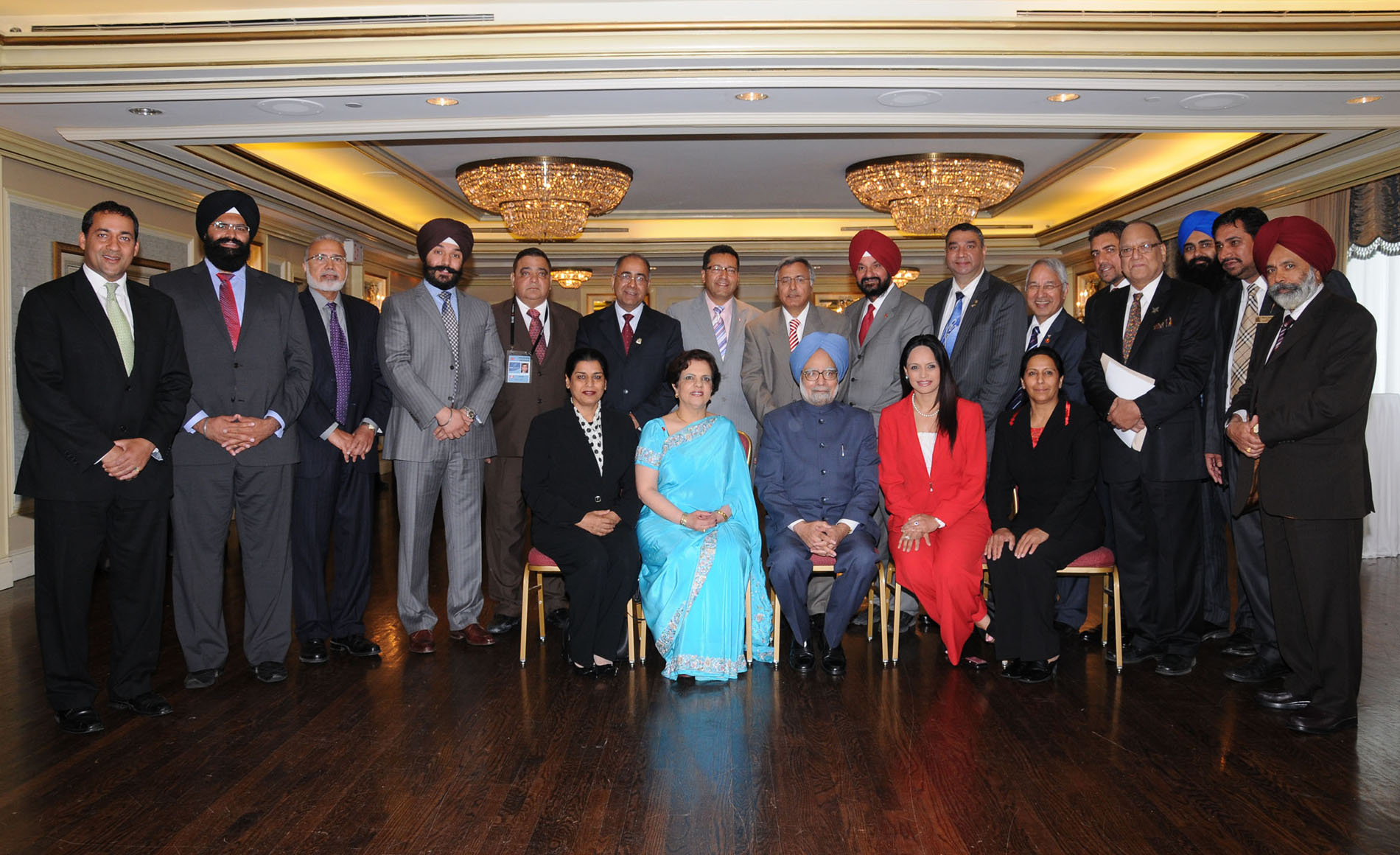
Bains with Indian Prime Minister Manmohan Singh in Toronto on June 28, 2010

In January 2011, Bains claimed that the Bloc Québécois was using "the politics of fear" and argued against their attempt to ban the ceremonial Sikh kirpan from the parliamentary buildings after an incident in which the Quebec National Assembly denied entry to a group of four kirpan-wearing Sikhs.

==== Out of Parliament ====
In the 2011 federal election, Eve Adams, a former Mississauga City Councillor, beat Bains by over 5,000 votes. Bains was the Ontario co-chair for the federal Liberal campaign, and was returned to the House of Commons in the 2015 federal election in the new riding of Mississauga—Malton.

==== Minister of Innovation, Science and Industry ====
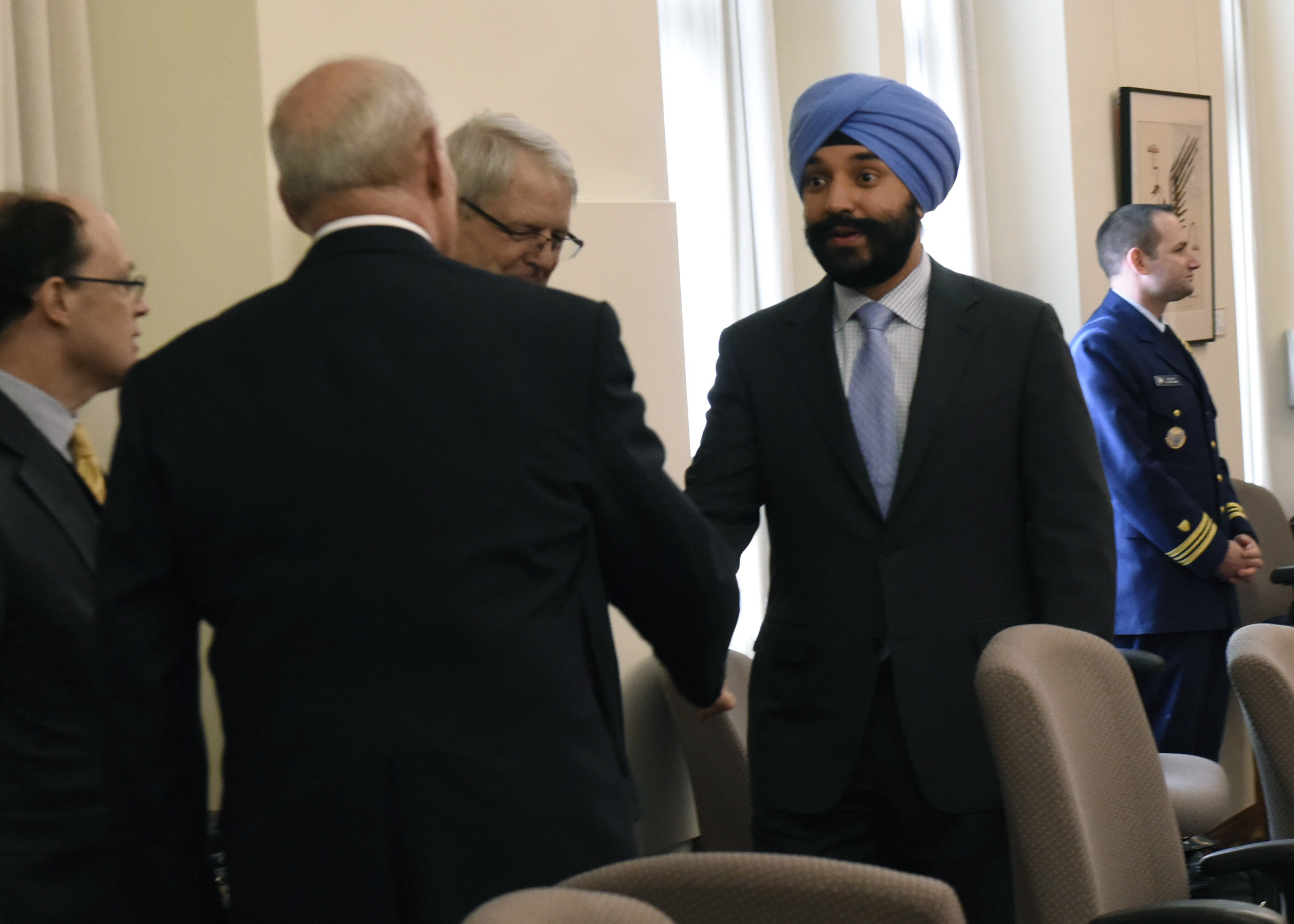
Bains meeting with John F. Kelly, the United States Secretary of Homeland Security, in March 2017

On November 4, 2015, he was appointed the minister of innovation, science and economic development in Justin Trudeau's Cabinet. The next day, Bains announced that the mandatory long form census would be restored for 2016, after it was removed from the 2011 edition under the Harper government. Under Bains’ leadership, the 2016 Census response rate exceeded 98 percent, making it the most successful Census since 1666.

A major focus of Bains’ mandate is to spur innovation and economic development in Canada. Following public consultations across Canada in the summer of 2016, he launched the Inclusive Innovation Agenda. Based on the consultations, the Bains identified three priority areas for Canada's Innovation Agenda: finding better ways for more Canadians to get the skills the global economy demands (People), harnessing emerging tech that would create industries and jobs that never existed before as well as reinvigorate existing ones (Technology), and encouraging more Canadians to start and grow companies that are competitive in the global economy (Companies).

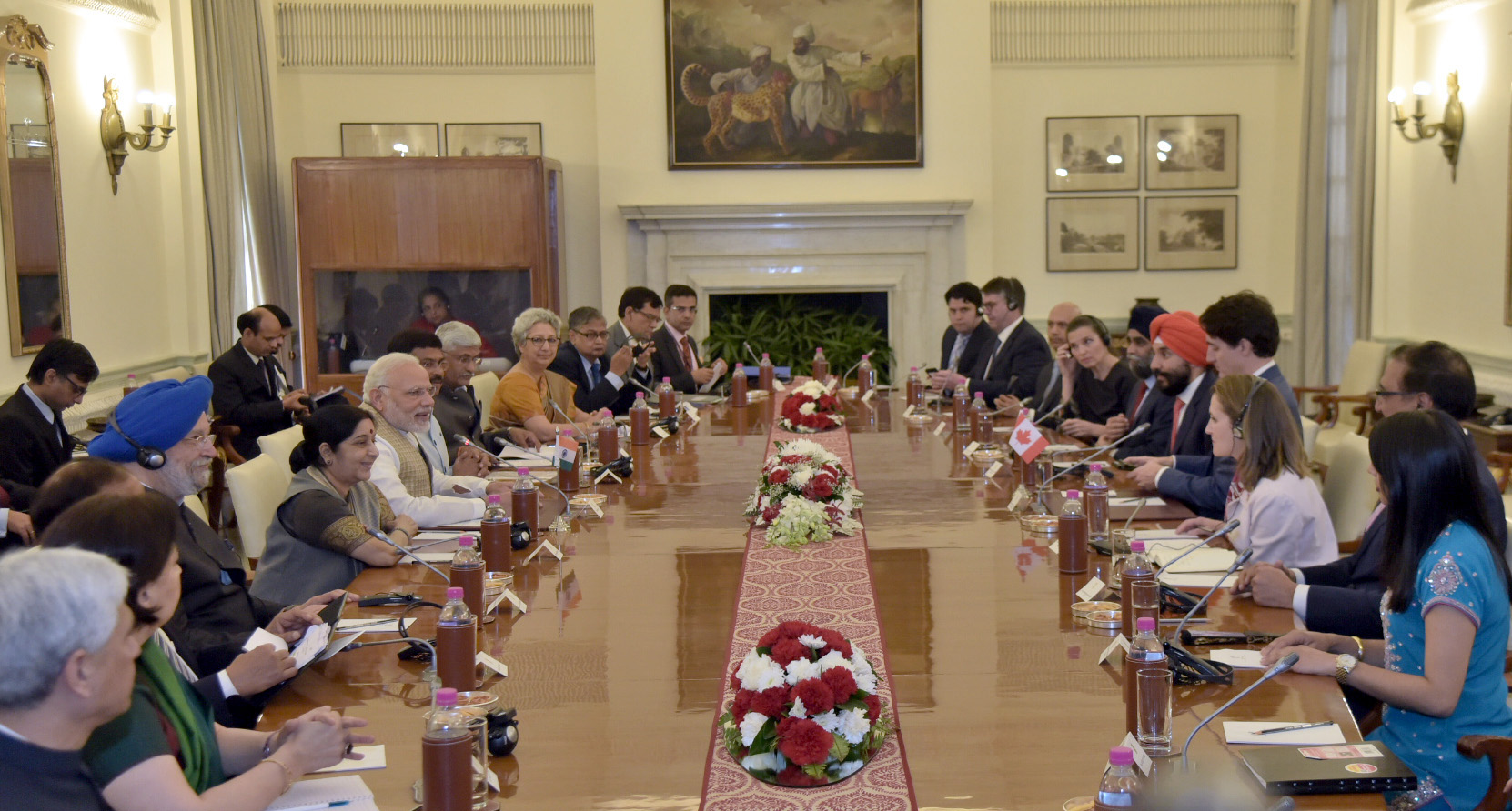
Bains and other members of Trudeau's cabinet with Indian Prime Minister Narendra Modi in February 2018

Bains worked closely with the Advisory Council on Economic Growth, which advised the minister of finance on economic policies to achieve long-term sustainable growth. The council called for a gradual increase in permanent immigration to Canada to 450,000 people a year.

In 2019, Minister Bains announced Canada's Digital Charter.

In August 2020, amidst a review of an August 2019 decision by the Canadian Radio-television and Telecommunications Commission (CRTC) to reduce capacity rates by up to 43% and access rates up to 77%, Bains released a statement saying that the government shared the fears of Canada's big telecommunication corporations that it went too far and would disincentivize investment in communication networks, especially less Partytable rural and remote areas. However, the statement also said that the government would not formally intervene in the ongoing review.

==== Retirement from federal politics ====
On January 20, 2021, Bains announced he was stepping down from his position and would not run in the 2021 Canadian federal election for family reasons. He was replaced by Foreign Affairs Minister François-Philippe Champagne. Ramesh Sangha, the MP for Brampton Centre accused Bains and fellow Liberal cabinet minister Harjit Sajjan of supporting Khalistani extremism. Sangha also believed that Bains resigned because he harbored those views. The Liberal Party removed Sangha because they found the allegations to be baseless.

=== Provincial politics (2026–present) ===
Bains declined to run in the 2023 Ontario Liberal Party leadership election to succeed Steven Del Duca. On May 25, 2026, Bains launched his campaign in the party's 2026 leadership election to succeed Bonnie Crombie. On November 21, 2026, Bains was elected leader of the Ontario Liberal Party.

== Outside politics ==
Bains also entered academia and became an adjunct lecturer in a Master of Public Service program at the University of Waterloo and a distinguished visiting professor at the Ted Rogers School of Management at Ryerson University, starting in 2013 for a one-year term. His teaching contract at Ryerson was extended, and he was still a professor at the time of his re-election in 2015.

After leaving federal politics, Bains joined CIBC as Vice Chair, Global Investment Banking in September 2021. He left the position in May 2023 and joined Rogers Communications as Chief Corporate Affairs Officer. At Rogers, he reportedly worked on getting the merger between the company and Shaw Communications approved.

== Personal life ==
Bains currently resides in Peel Region with his wife, Brahamjot, with whom he has two daughters.

In 2017, he was forced to remove his turban at Detroit Metropolitan Airport, before boarding a flight back to Canada. Bains, who has a Sikh background, wears a turban for religious reasons. After being told to remove his turban, Canada complained to the U.S. government, and Bains received an apology.

== Recognition ==
Because of his position in the Party and the roles he has been given, Bains was seen as a rising star, and had been selected three years in a row in the Hill Times survey as the best up and comer from 2004 to 2006. The Hill Times featured Bains on the cover of their Power & Influence magazine in 2017. Dubbed the ‘Minister of Everything’ in the article, he was ranked 4th most influential. He is a recipient of Startup Canada's Policy Prize (2017). In 2017, Bains was listed in The Globe and Mail's The Power 50. He is featured as the second influencer on the 2018 Bay Street Bull Power 50 list, and Apolitical listed him among the World's 100 Most Influential People in Digital Government.

== Electoral history ==
2019 Canadian federal election: Mississauga—Malton
Party	Candidate	Votes	%	±%	Expenditures
Liberal	Navdeep Bains	27,890	57.5	-1.62	$76,024.88
Conservative	Tom Varughese	12,528	25.8	-0.64	$86,705.72
New Democratic	Nikki Clarke	6,103	12.6	+0.29	$12,952.47
Green	Christina Porter	1,251	2.6	+0.93	$4.98
People's	Tahir Gora	369	0.8		none listed
United	Prudence Buchanan	306	0.6		$0.00
Marxist–Leninist	Frank Chilelli	90	0.2		$0.00
Total valid votes/expense limit		48,537	100.0		
Total rejected ballots		500			
Turnout		49,037	62.0		
Eligible voters		79,034			
Liberal hold		Swing		-0.49	
Source: Elections Canada

2015 Canadian federal election
Party	Candidate	Votes	%	±%	Expenditures
Liberal	Navdeep Bains	26,165	59.12	+22.33	$103,144.90
Conservative	Jagdish Grewal	11,701	26.44	-11.00	$126,893.52
New Democratic	Dianne Douglas	5,450	12.31	-11.12	$5,226.05
Green	Heather Mercer	737	1.67	-0.37	–
Independent	Naresh Tharani	210	0.46	–	$8,153.79
Total valid votes/Expense limit		44,256	100.00		$207,082.35
Total rejected ballots		237	0.53	–	
Turnout		44,493	59.76	–	
Eligible voters		74,448			
Liberal notional gain from Conservative		Swing		+16.67	
Source: Elections Canada

2011 Canadian federal election
Party	Candidate	Votes	%
Conservative	Eve Adams	23,632	44.72
Liberal	Navdeep Bains	18,579	35.16
New Democratic	Jim Glavan	9,465	17.91
Green	Benjamin Stone	1,044	1.98
Marxist–Leninist	Tim Sullivan	127	0.24
Total valid votes		52,847	100.00
Total rejected ballots		351	0.66
Turnout		53,198	57.27
Eligible voters		92,890	–

2008 Canadian federal election
Party	Candidate	Votes	%	±%	Expenditures
Liberal	Navdeep Bains	21,220	47.69	-6.25	$ 65,107.35
Conservative	Salma Ataullahjan	14,664	32.96	+2.21	51,467.58
New Democratic	Karan Pandher	5,268	11.84	+0.96	5,832.24
Green	Grace Yogaretnam	2,947	6.62	+2.82	5,666.20
Marxist–Leninist	Tim Sullivan	395	0.89	+0.26	
Total valid votes/Expense limit		44,494	100.00	-12.31	$ 91,776.94
Total rejected ballots		343	0.76	+0.15	
Turnout		44,837	49.39	-10.62	
Eligible voters		90,777		+6.71	

2006 Canadian federal election
Party	Candidate	Votes	%	±%	Expenditures
Liberal	Navdeep Bains	27,370	53.94	-3.22	$ 80,611.34
Conservative	Arnjeet Sangha	15,605	30.75	+6.66	58,602.08
New Democratic	Nirvan Balkisoon	5,521	10.88	-3.92	9,470.07
Green	Grace Yogaretnam	1,927	3.80	+0.28	7,606.18
Marxist–Leninist	Tim Sullivan	319	0.63	+0.20	
Total valid votes/Expense limit		50,742	100.00	+17.17	$ 82,924.57
Total rejected ballots		310	0.61	-0.13	
Turnout		51,052	60.01	+6.17	
Eligible voters		85,068		+4.97	

2004 Canadian federal election
Party	Candidate	Votes	%	Expenditures
Liberal	Navdeep Bains	24,753	57.16	$ 70,830.08
Conservative	Parvinder Sandhu	10,433	24.09	64,050.50
New Democratic	Larry Taylor	6,411	14.80	14,516.24
Green	Paul Simas	1,525	3.52	
Marxist–Leninist	David Gershuny	185	0.43	23.48
Total valid votes/Expense limit		43,307	100.00	$ 78,421.35
Total rejected ballots		321	0.74	
Turnout		43,628	53.84	
Eligible voters		81,037		

29th Canadian Ministry (2015–2025) – Cabinet of Justin Trudeau
Cabinet post (1)
Predecessor	Office	Successor
James Moore	Minister of Innovation, Science and Economic Development; November 4, 2015 – January 12, 2021	François-Philippe Champagne
Parliament of Canada
New constituency	Member of Parliament for Mississauga—Malton; October 19, 2015 – September 20, 2021	Succeeded by Iqwinder Gaheer
New constituency	Member of Parliament for Mississauga—Brampton South; June 28, 2004 – May 2, 2011	Succeeded by Eve Adams
