= Iqwinder Gaheer =

Canadian politician (born 1993)

Iqwinder Gaheer MP
- Gaheer in 2026

Member of Parliament
- Incumbent
- Assumed office September 20, 2021
- Preceded by: Navdeep Bains
- Constituency: Mississauga—Malton

Personal details
- Born: July 12, 1993 (age 33) Punjab, India
- Party: Liberal
- Education: Schulich School of Business, York University (BBA); Harvard Law School (JD)
- Occupation: Politician, Lawyer

Iqwinder Singh Gaheer MP (born July 12, 1993) is a Canadian politician who was elected to represent the riding of Mississauga—Malton in the House of Commons of Canada in the 2021 Canadian federal election.

== Early life and career ==
Gaheer was born in Punjab, India to Maninder Singh, a construction worker and plumber, and Baljit Kaur, a homemaker. Gaheer's father had immigrated to Canada in 1992. He and the rest of his family joined his father in Canada in 1999. Describing his early life, the Toronto Star wrote, "Gaheer has a compelling, almost made for politics, story. He was born in a small village in the Punjab. He moved to Canada when he was six years old. He spent his summers growing up in Peel working on his father’s plumbing crew."

Gaheer graduated from Bramalea Secondary School in Brampton. After completing high school, Gaheer attended the Schulich School of Business, York University where he received his Bachelor of Business Administration. He then went on to attend Harvard Law School from 2016 to 2019, where he served as Co-Editor-in-Chief of the Harvard Human Rights Journal. Beginning in September 2019, Gaheer worked in New York City, in the litigation department of Kirkland & Ellis LLP, a large international corporate law firm.

== Political career ==
In his first election in 2021, Gaheer won the Liberal nomination for the riding of Mississauga—Malton by acclamation, and won the seat with approximately 53 per cent of the total vote. Gaheer was elected chair of the Standing Committee on Public Safety and National Security in November 2024, and held it until Parliament was prorogued in January 2025.

In the 2025 Liberal Party of Canada leadership election, he endorsed Mark Carney.

He was appointed as a member of the National Security and Intelligence Committee of Parliamentarians in September 2025.

At the time of the 2025 Canadian federal election, he lived in Caledon East, Ontario.

== Electoral record ==
2025 Canadian federal election: Mississauga—Malton
Party	Candidate	Votes	%	±%	Expenditures
Liberal	Iqwinder Singh Gaheer	26,793	53.30	+0.62	$89,091.36
Conservative	Jaspreet Sandhu	21,202	42.18	+11.39	$78,604.04
New Democratic	Inderjeetsingh Ailsinghani	1,290	2.57	–11.17	$115.84
People's	Nathan Quinlan	983	1.96	+1.66	$1,867.25
Total valid votes/expense limit		50,654	99.24	–	$128,303.72
Total rejected ballots		386	0.76		
Turnout		51,040	62.34		
Eligible voters		81,871			
Liberal notional hold		Swing		–5.39	
Source: Elections Canada

2021 Canadian federal election: Mississauga—Malton
Party	Candidate	Votes	%	±%	Expenditures
Liberal	Iqwinder Gaheer	21,766	52.8	-4.7	$75,599.65
Conservative	Clyde Roach	12,625	30.6	+4.8	$36,598.37
New Democratic	Waseem Ahmed	5,771	14.0	+1.4	$36,233.25
Green	Mark Davidson	811	2.0	-0.6	$0.00
Marxist–Leninist	Frank Chilelli	275	0.7	+0.5	$0.00
Total valid votes/expense limit		41,248	–	–	$109,482.72
Total rejected ballots		435			
Turnout		41,683	54.1		
Eligible voters		77,095			
Liberal hold		Swing		-4.7	
Source: Elections Canada
