= Mississauga East =

Former federal electoral district in Ontario, Canada

Ontario electoral district
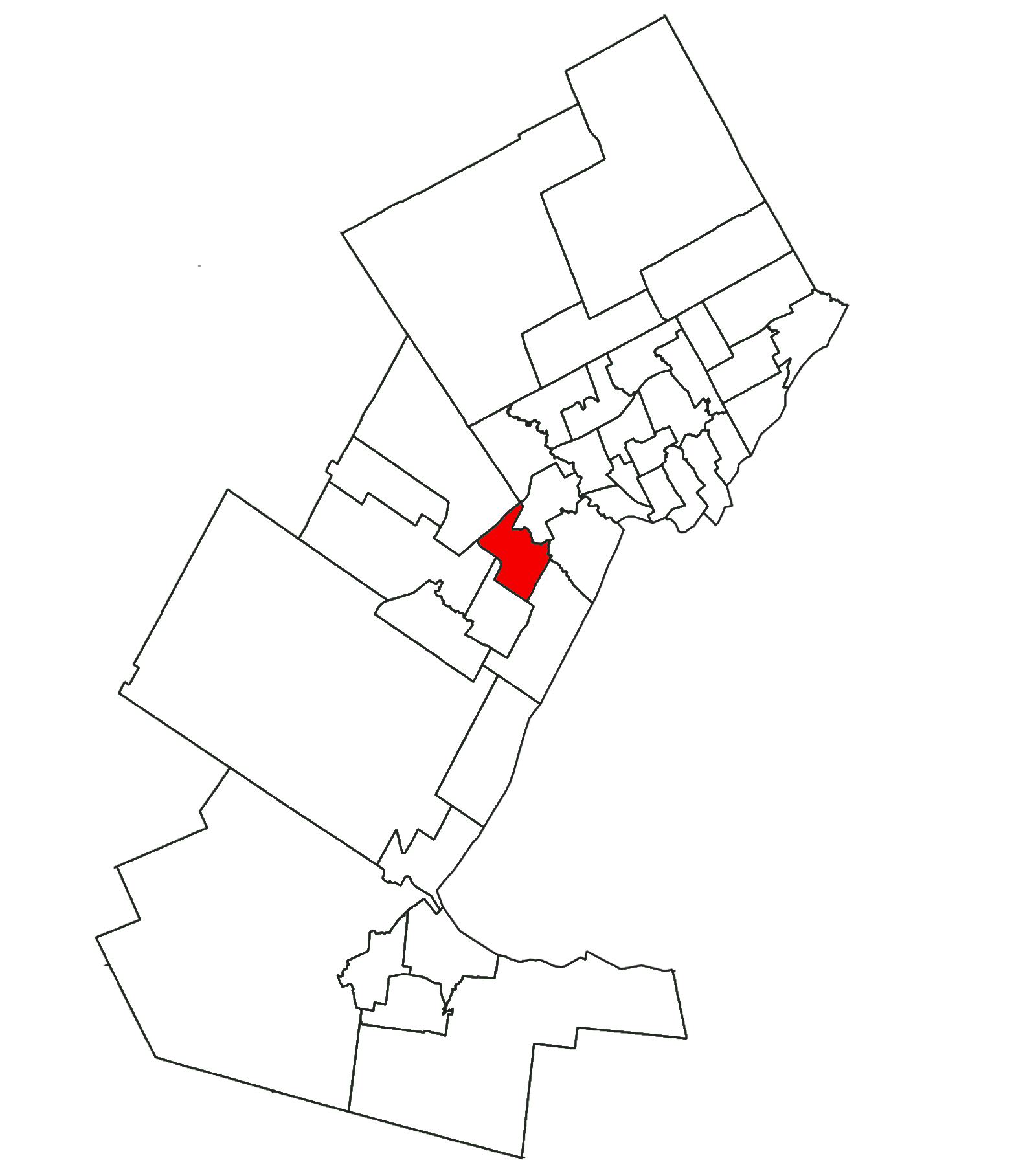
- Mississauga East in relation to nearby electoral districts (1996 boundaries)

Defunct federal electoral district
- Legislature: House of Commons
- District created: 1987
- District abolished: 2003
- First contested: 1988
- Last contested: 2000

Mississauga East was a federal electoral district in Ontario, Canada, that was represented in the House of Commons of Canada from 1988 to 2003. It was located in the city of Mississauga.

This riding was created in 1987 from parts of Mississauga North riding. It consisted of the eastern part of the city of Mississauga. The electoral district was abolished in 2003 when it was re-distributed into the ridings of Mississauga East—Cooksville, Mississauga South, and Mississauga—Brampton South.

== Members of Parliament ==
| Parliament | Years | Member | Party |
|---|---|---|---|
Riding created from Mississauga North
| 34th | 1988–1993 | Albina Guarnieri | Liberal |
| 35th | 1993–1997 | Albina Guarnieri | Liberal |
| 36th | 1997–2000 | Albina Guarnieri | Liberal |
| 37th | 2000–2004 | Albina Guarnieri | Liberal |
Riding dissolved into Mississauga East—Cooksville, Mississauga South, and Mississauga—Brampton South

== Federal election results ==
1988 Canadian federal election: Mississauga East
| Party | Candidate | Votes | % | ±% |
|---|---|---|---|---|
| Liberal | Albina Guarnieri | 23,055 | | |
| Progressive Conservative | Laurie Pallett | 20,963 | | |
| New Democratic Party | Walter Grozdanovski | 5,677 | | |
| Libertarian | Sandra Harrington | 345 | | |
| Confederation of Regions | Paul Fromm | 258 | | |
| Independent | Adel Di Palma | 189 | | |
| Commonwealth of Canada | Trevor I. D. Vining | 79 | | |

1993 Canadian federal election: Mississauga East
| Party | Candidate | Votes | % | ±% |
|---|---|---|---|---|
| Liberal | Albina Guarnieri | 32,470 | | |
| Reform | Peter Zathey | 9,475 | | |
| Progressive Conservative | Carl De Faria | 6,514 | | |
| New Democratic Party | John Jackson | 1,393 | | |
| National | Michael Patrick Curran | 395 | | |
| Natural Law | Geraldine Jackson | 323 | | |
| Independent | Adrian Earl Crewson | 149 | | |
| Marxist–Leninist | Yvon Turgeon | 118 | | |

1997 Canadian federal election
| Party | Candidate | Votes |
|---|---|---|
| Liberal | Albina Guarnieri | 23,780 |
| Progressive Conservative | Michael T. Wojnarowicz | 7,852 |
| Reform | Peter Zathey | 5,617 |
| New Democratic | Terry Gorman | 2,156 |
| Canadian Action | Frank D. D'Andrade | 262 |

2000 Canadian federal election: Mississauga East
| Party | Candidate | Votes | % | ±% |
|---|---|---|---|---|
| Liberal | Albina Guarnieri | 22,158 | | |
| Alliance | Jainstien Dookie | 5,372 | | |
| Progressive Conservative | Riina Defaria | 5,144 | | |
| New Democratic Party | Henry Beer | 1,451 | | |
| Marxist–Leninist | Pierre Chénier | 227 | | |

== See also ==
- List of Canadian electoral districts
- Historical federal electoral districts of Canada
