= Albina Guarnieri =

Canadian politician

The Honourable Albina Guarnieri PC

Minister of Veterans Affairs
- In office July 20, 2004 – February 5, 2006
- Prime Minister: Paul Martin
- Preceded by: John McCallum
- Succeeded by: Greg Thompson

Associate Minister of National Defence
- In office December 12, 2003 – July 20, 2004
- Prime Minister: Paul Martin
- Preceded by: Mary Collins (1993)
- Succeeded by: Mauril Bélanger

Member of Parliament for Mississauga East-Cooksville (Mississauga East; 1988–2004)
- In office November 21, 1988 – May 2, 2011
- Preceded by: Bob Horner (Mississauga North)
- Succeeded by: Wladyslaw Lizon

Personal details
- Born: June 23, 1953 (age 72) Faeto, Province of Foggia, Italy
- Party: Liberal
- Spouse: John Campbell
- Profession: Management consultant

Albina Guarnieri PC (born June 23, 1953) is a former Canadian politician. She was a Liberal member of the House of Commons of Canada from 1988 to 2011 who represented the Greater Toronto Area ridings of Mississauga East and Mississauga East—Cooksville. She served in the cabinet of Prime Minister Paul Martin as Minister of Veterans Affairs.

== Background ==
Guarnieri was educated at McGill University, where she graduated with a master's degree in English. As part of her thesis, she wrote a book called The cheese on the moon: a collection of short stories. After graduating she worked for the federal government as a spokesperson for Bob Kaplan and also as a press liaison office for Stuart Smith, leader of the Ontario Liberal Party. In 1981, she worked as an assistant to Toronto Mayor Art Eggleton but left after seven months "because of a disagreement". In 1984, she worked for Lowther Consulting, a company owned by Jim Coutts who was a principal secretary for Prime Minister Pierre Trudeau. She and her husband live in Mississauga.

== Politics ==
In 1988 Guarnieri was nominated in the new riding of Mississauga East after a fractious contest with another candidate, Armindo Silva. Silva contended that the vote, which Guarnieri won by a margin of 71, was marred by 'irregularities and improprieties'. He vowed to contest the result with the party's nomination board. The party hired police officers to control the crowd due to threats made against Guarnieri. The nomination board upheld the vote despite "deeply disturbing" voting irregularities but this decision was overturned by the Ontario party's executive board. A second, less contentious vote was held which Guarnieri won by a much wider margin.

Guarnieri was elected as Member of Parliament in 1988 in a fairly close race with her Progressive Conservative opponent Laurie Pallett. She won all her subsequent elections in Mississauga East and after 2004 in [Mississauga East—Cooksville by wide margins. A longtime Martin loyalist, she was a relatively obscure backbencher during the Chrétien era. Martin named her Associate Minister of National Defence and Minister of State for Civil Preparedness in his first cabinet. She moved to Veterans Affairs on July 20, 2004.

She also served as Chair of the Standing Committee on Human Resources Development and the Status of Persons with Disabilities, Chair of the Standing Committee on Government Operations, and Co-Chair of the Standing Committee on Official Languages. She also served as Parliamentary Secretary to the Minister of Canadian Heritage.

In September 2010, Guarnieri announced that she would not seek re-election due to being diagnosed with multiple sclerosis.

=== Cabinet posts ===
27th Canadian Ministry (2003–2006) – Cabinet of Paul Martin
Cabinet posts (2)
Predecessor	Office	Successor
John McCallum	Minister of Veterans Affairs; 2004–2006	Greg Thompson
Mary Collins (Note: Collins previously filled this role from 1989 to 1993. The position remained vacant for 10 years.)	Associate Minister of National Defence; 2003–2004	Mauril Bélanger
Sub-Cabinet Post
Predecessor	Title	Successor
	Minister of State (Civil Preparedness) (2003–2004)	
