= List of sportsperson-politicians =

This is a list of sportspeople who also worked as politicians and vice versa.

== Africa ==
=== Algeria ===
Name	Sport	Position
Ahmed Ben Bella	Association football (one appearance in Coupe de France 1940)	President of Algeria (1963–1965)
Abderrahmane Hammad		
Nadir Larbaoui		

=== Angola ===
Name	Sport	Position
Palmira Barbosa		

=== Central African Republic ===
Name	Sport	Position
Jean Bengué	Basketball	Member of Savigny-sur-Braye Municipal Council (2008–2015); Minister of Information (1988–1990); Minister of Youth and Sports (1980–1985)
Théophile Sonny Colé	Football	Member of National Assembly (2005-?); Presidential candidate in the 2015–16 Central African general election
Gaston Gambor	Basketball	Minister of Youth and Sports (1987-?); Minister of Social Affairs (1983–1984)
Fidèle Gouandjika	Karate; Qwan Ki Do	Minister of Rural Development and Agriculture (2009–2013); Minister of Posts and Telecommunications and New Technology (2005–2009)
Sonny M'Pokomandji	Basketball	Minister of Equipment and Transport (2003–2005); Member of National Assembly (2005-?)
François Naoueyama	Basketball (Olympic athlete)	Minister of the Environment and Ecology (2009–2013)
François Péhoua	Basketball	Minister of the Economic Plan, International Cooperation, and Statistics (1971); Deputy Minister of Budget (1970); Candidate in the 1981 Central African presidential election

=== Democratic Republic of the Congo ===
Name	Sport	Position
Jean Kasusula		
Robert Kidiaba		

=== Egypt ===
Name	Sport	Position
Taher Abouzeid		
Salah Dessouki		
Mourad Fahmy		
Hossam Ghaly		
Mustafa Mansour	Association football (1934 FIFA World Cup, Olympic athlete)	Government minister
Ahmed Shobair		

=== Equatorial Guinea ===
Name	Sport	Position
Rodolfo Bodipo		
Pedro Mabale		

=== Gambia ===
Name	Sport	Position
Sheikh Omar Faye	Athletics (Olympic athlete)	Minister of Youth, Sports and Religious Affairs (2006–2007)

=== Ghana ===
Name	Sport	Position
Kofi Baako		
Robert Kotei	Athletics (high jump; Commonwealth medalist)	Member of the Supreme Military Council

=== Guinea ===
Name	Sport	Position
Titi Camara	Association football	Minister of Sports (2010–2012)
M'Mahawa Sylla	Handball	Governor of Conakry (2021–present)

=== Ivory Coast ===
Name	Sport	Position
Yoyaga Coulibaly		
Bonaventure Kalou	Association football	Mayor of Vavoua

=== Kenya ===
Name	Sport	Position
Wesley Korir	Athletics (marathon)	Member of the National Assembly
Elijah Lagat	Athletics (marathon, Olympic athlete)	Member of the National Assembly for Emgwen (2007–?)
David Lelei		
John Harun Mwau	Shooting (Olympic athlete)	Candidate in the 2013 Kenyan general election at Makueni; Candidate in the 2013 Makueni by-election
Orie Rogo Manduli		
Frank O'Brien Wilson		

=== Liberia ===
Name	Sport	Position
Josiah Johnson		
Wesley Momo Johnson	Athletics (Olympic athlete)	Vice-chairman of the National Transitional Government of Liberia (2003–2006)
Clarence Moniba		
Jonathan Sogbie		
George Weah	Association football	President of Liberia (2018–2024); Senator for Montserrado County (2015–2018)

=== Mali ===
Name	Sport	Position
Salif Keïta		
Garan Fabou Kouyate		

=== Morocco ===
Name	Sport	Position
Salaheddine Mezouar	Basketball (international)	Leader of the Opposition (2011–2013)
Nawal El Moutawakel	Athletics (Olympic medalist)	Minister of Sports (2007–?)

=== Nigeria ===
Name	Sport	Position
Justin Nnorom		

=== Republic of Congo ===
Name	Sport	Position
Jacques Yvon Ndolou	Association football	Minister of Defence (2002–2009); Minister of Sport (2009–2011); Ambassador of the Congo to Germany (2012–2017); Ambassador of the Congo to the Central African Republic (2017–present)

=== Seychelles ===
Name	Sport	Position
Jean-Paul Adam	Swimming (Olympic athlete)	Minister for Foreign Affairs (2010–2015)

=== South Africa ===
Name	Sport	Position
Dawie de Villiers		
Peter de Villiers		
André de Wet		
Danny Jordaan	Association football and cricket	Mayor of Nelson Mandela Bay Metropolitan Municipality (2015–2016); Member of South African Parliament for Eastern Cape (1994–1997)
Louis Luyt	Rugby	Leader of Federal Alliance and Member of Parliament
Christopher Newton Thompson		
Ossie Newton-Thompson	Cricket	Member of Parliament
Paul Roos	Rugby	Member of Parliament (1948, died shortly after election)
Frank Waring		

=== Tanzania ===
Name	Sport	Position
Hassan Dyamwale		

=== Uganda ===
Name	Sport	Position
Julius Achon	Middle-distance runner	Member of the Ugandan Parliament (2016-)
Idi Amin	Boxing (light heavyweight boxing champion)	President of Uganda (1971–1979)
Aggrey Awori	Athletics (Olympic athlete)	Member of the Ugandan Parliament (2001–2006); Minister for Information and Communications Technology (2009–2011)
Frank Nyangweso		
Kiwanuka Sulaiman		

=== Zimbabwe ===
Name	Sport	Position
Kirsty Coventry	Swimming	Minister of Youth, Sport, Arts and Recreation (2018–2025)
Tabetha Kanengoni-Malinga		

== Asia ==
=== Afghanistan ===
Name	Sport	Position
Robina Muqimyar	Taekwondo	Member of Parliament (2019–2021)

=== Armenia ===
Name	Sport	Position
Yurik Vardanyan		

=== Bangladesh ===
Name	Sport	Position
Mashrafe Mortaza	Cricket	Member of Parliament
Shakib Al Hasan	Cricket	Member of Parliament

=== China ===
Name	Sport	Position
Liu Xiang	110 metres hurdles (Olympic athlete)	Member of the National Committee of the Chinese People's Political Consultative Conference (2008–2018)
Xu Mengtao	Freestyle skiing (Olympic athlete)	Delegate to National Congress of the Chinese Communist Party (2022)
Wu Dajing	Short-track speed skating (Olympic athlete)	Delegate to National Congress of the Chinese Communist Party (2022)
Zhang Yufei	Swimming (Olympic athlete)	Deputy to the National People's Congress (2023–)
Zhu Ting	Volleyball (Olympic athlete)	Deputy to the National People's Congress (2018–2023)

==== Hong Kong ====
Name	Sport	Position
Vivian Kong	Épée (Olympic athlete)	Member of the Legislative Council of Hong Kong (2026–)
Ronnie Wong	Swimming (Olympic athlete)	Member of the Urban Council (1986–1991; 1995–1998); Member of the Southern District Council (2001–?)

=== Georgia ===
Name	Sport	Position
Kakha Kaladze	Association football	Mayor of Tbilisi (2017–present)
Mikheil Kavelashvili	Association football	President of Georgia (2024–present)
Levan Kobiashvili	Association football	Member of the Parliament of Georgia (2020–2024)
Lasha Talakhadze	Weightlifting	Member of the Parliament of Georgia (2024–present)

=== India ===
Name	Sport	Position
Kirti Azad	Cricket (national team)	Lok Sabha MP for Darbhanga (1999–2004; 2009–2019) and Bardhaman–Durgapur (2024–); Delhi MLA for Gole Market (1993–1998)
Mohammad Azharuddin	Cricket (national team)	Lok Sabha MP for Moradabad (2009–2014)
Prasun Banerjee	Football (national team)	Lok Sabha MP for Howrah (2013–)
Chetan Chauhan	Cricket (national team)	Lok Sabha MP for Amroha (1991–1998); Uttar Pradesh MLA (2017–2020)
Kalikesh Narayan Singh Deo	Shooting and basketball (national teams)	Odisha MLA for Saintala (2004–2009; 2024–); Lok Sabha MP for Bolangir (2009–2019)
Gautam Gambhir	Cricket (national team)	Lok Sabha MP for East Delhi (2019–2024)
Mary Kom	Boxing (Olympic and Asian Games medalist)	Nominated Rajya Sabha MP (2016–2022)
Aslam Sher Khan	Field hockey (World Cup and Asian Games medalist)	Lok Sabha MP for Betul (1984–1989)
Manoharsinhji Pradyumansinhji	Cricket (first-class)	Gujarat MLA for Rajkot West (1967–1971; 1990–1995) and Rajkot South (1980–1985)
Jaipal Singh Munda	Field hockey (Olympic gold)	Member of the Constituent Assembly; Lok Sabha MP for Ranchi (1952–1967) and Khunti (1967–1970)
Yusuf Pathan	Cricket (national team)	Lok Sabha MP for Baharampur (2024–)
Wangnia Pongte	Football	Arunachal Pradesh MLA for Changlang North
Rajyavardhan Singh Rathore	Shooting (Olympic medallist)	Rajasthan MLA (2023–); Rajasthan Minister of Youth Affairs and Sports
Laxmi Ratan Shukla	Cricket (national team)	West Bengal MLA for Howrah Uttar (2016–2021)
Navjot Singh Sidhu	Cricket (national team)	Lok Sabha MP (2004–2014); Nominated Rajya Sabha MP (2016); Punjab MLA (2017–2022)
Jyotirmoyee Sikdar	Athletics (Olympic athlete and Asian Championships medalist)	Lok Sabha MP for Krishnanagar (2004–2009)
Harbhajan Singh	Cricket (national team)	Rajya Sabha MP for Punjab (2022–)
Karni Singh	Shooting (Olympic athlete and Asian Games medalist)	Lok Sabha MP for Bikaner (1952–1977)
Pargat Singh	Field hockey (Olympic athlete and Asian Games medalist)	Punjab MLA for Jalandhar Cantonment (2012–)
Sachin Tendulkar	Cricket (national team)	Nominated Rajya Sabha MP (2012–2018)
Dilip Tirkey	Field hockey (Asian Games medalist)	Rajya Sabha MP for Odisha (2012–2018)

=== Indonesia ===
Name	Sport	Position
Ashari Danudirdjo	Sailing	Minister of Trade (1966–1967); Minister of Textile Industry (1966)
Maladi	Association football	Minister of Information (1959–1962); Minister of Sports (1962–1966)
Moreno Soeprapto	Motorsport	Member of the House of Representatives (2014–present)
Utut Adianto	Chess	Member of the House of Representatives (2009–present); Deputy Speaker of the House of Representatives (2018–2019)
Taufik Hidayat	Badminton	Deputy Minister of Youth and Sports (2024–present)
Yampit Nawipa	Association football	Regent of Paniai (2025–present)

=== Iran ===
Name	Sport	Position
Amir Abedini	Football	Member of the Islamic City Council of Tehran (2000–2003)
Javad Arianmanesh	Football	Member of Parliament
Alireza Dabir	Wrestling	Member of the Islamic City Council of Tehran (2007–2017)
Saeid Daghighi		
Ali Fathollahzadeh	Football	Ran for City Council of Tehran in 2003, but lost Ran for Parliament in 2008, but lost
Mahmoud Goudarzi	Wrestling	Minister of Youth Affairs & Sports (2013–2016)
Abbas Jadidi	Wrestling	Member of the Islamic City Council of Tehran (2013–2017)
Amir Reza Khadem	Wrestling	Member of Parliament (2004–2008); Vice Minister of Youth Affairs & Sports (2013–present)
Rasoul Khadem	Wrestling	Member of the Islamic City Council of Tehran (2003–2013)
Hossein Rezazadeh	Weightlifting	Member of the Islamic City Council of Tehran (2013–2017)
Hadi Saei	Taekwondo	Member of the Islamic City Council of Tehran (2007–2017)
Hamid Sajjadi	Athletics	Minister of Sport and Youth (2021–present)
Nasrollah Sajjadi	Football	Vice Minister of Youth Affairs & Sports (2013–2017)

=== Iraq ===
Name	Sport	Position
Ahmed Radhi	Association football	Member of the Council of Representatives (2007–?)

=== Israel ===
Name	Sport	Position
Yoel Alroy	Soccer	Mayor of Netanya
Aleksandr Averbukh	Athletics	Councilor in Netanya
Michael Kolganov	Kayak	Councilor in Tiberias
Yaron Levi	Judo	Member of Knesset
Moshe Matalon	Athletics	Member of Knesset
Tzipora Obziler	Tennis	Councilor in Givatayim
Orna Ostfeld	Basketball	Councilor in Ramat Hasharon
Yoel Razvozov	Judo	Member of Knesset, Minister of Tourism
Rifaat Turk	Soccer	Deputy mayor of Tel Aviv-Jaffa
Bella Zur	Swimming	Councilor in Ra'anana

=== Japan ===
Name	Sport	Position
Jiro Akama		
Kentaro Asahi		
Takenori Emoto		
Shota Goto		
Ichiro Hatta		
Ryōzō Hiranuma		
Tsukasa Hosaka		
Daisuke Hoshi		
Hiroo Ishii		
Susumu Katsumata		
Akemi Matsuno		
Junko Mihara		
Minanogawa Tōzō		
Jun Misawa		
Masaaki Mori		
Kiyoshi Nakahata		
Kenji Narisako		
Yasutarō Sakagami		
Tomonobu Shimizu		
Genki Sudo		
Daichi Suzuki		
Kenjiro Tamiya		
Toshirō Tomochika		
Ryōta Tsuzuki		
Osamu Umeyama		

=== Kazakhstan ===
Name	Sport	Position
Däulet Turlyhanov		
Serik Konakbayev	Boxing (Olympic athlete)	Member of the Parliament of Kazakhstan (1999–?)

=== Malaysia ===
Name	Sport	Position
Baddrol Bakhtiar		
David E. L. Choong	Badminton	Penang State Legislative Assemblyman for Air Itam (1974–1978); Candidate in the 1964 Malaysian general election at Tanjong; Candidate in the 1990 Malaysian general election at Bukit Bendera
Khairy Jamaluddin		
Muhamad Radhi Mat Din		
Mohd Radzi Sheikh Ahmad		
Ishsam Shahruddin		
Soh Chin Ann	Association football (Olympic athlete)	Candidate in the 1986 Malaysian general election at Kota Melaka

=== Mongolia ===
Name	Sport	Position
Khaltmaagiin Battulga	Sambo	President of Mongolia (2017–2021)
Badmaanyambuugiin Bat-Erdene	Wrestling	Member of the State Great Khural (2004–?)
Dolgorsürengiin Sumyaabazar	Wrestling	Member of the State Great Khural (2013–2020)
Agvaansamdangiin Sükhbat	Wrestling	Member of the State Great Khural (2016–?)
Kyokushūzan Noboru	Sumo	Member of the State Great Khural (2008–2012)

=== Nepal ===
Name	Sport	Position
Ganesh Thapa		

=== North Korea ===
Name	Sport	Position
Han Pil-hwa		

=== Pakistan ===
Name	Sport	Position
Asif Bajwa	Field hockey	Member of the National Assembly
Syed Iftikhar Bokhari	Cricket	Member of the Senate of Pakistan (1988–1991)
Anwar Aziz Chaudhry	Swimming	Member of the National Assembly
Imran Khan	Cricket	Prime Minister (2018–2022)
Zafarullah Khan Jamali	Field hockey	Prime Minister (2002–2004)
Abdul Hafeez Kardar	Cricket	Provincial Assembly of the Punjab
Sarfraz Nawaz	Cricket	Provincial Assembly of the Punjab
Wahab Riaz		
Aamer Sohail	Cricket	Pakistan Muslim League (N) Member
Qasim Zia	Field hockey	Provincial Assembly of the Punjab (2002–2007)

=== Philippines ===
Name	Sport	Position
Ato Agustin	Basketball	Councilor, San Fernando, Pampanga
Don Allado	Basketball	Councilor, San Juan City (2022–present)
Paul Artadi	Basketball	Councilor, San Juan City (2016–present)
Herminio A. Astorga	Basketball	Vice Mayor, Manila (1962–1967)
Aldin Ayo	Basketball	Councilor, Sorsogon City (2010–2019)
Rosendo Balinas Jr.		
Narciso Bernardo		
Eric Buhain		
Philip Cezar	Basketball	Vice Mayor, San Juan City (1992–2001)
Atoy Co	Basketball	Councilor, Pasig City (1998–2007)
Bong Coo		
Jervy Cruz		
Vivencio Cuyugan	Boxing	Mayor, San Fernando, Pampanga (1938–1942; 1945)
Gary David		
Lydia de Vega	Athletics	Councilor, Meycauayan, Bulacan (2001–2004)
Gherome Ejercito		
Gerry Esplana	Basketball	Councilor, Valenzuela City (2004–2013)
Rey Evangelista		
Binky Favis	Basketball	Councilor, Parañaque (2013–2022)
Roilo Golez	Boxing	Congressman, Parañaque (1992–2001; 2004–2013); National Security Adviser (2001–2004)
Richard Gomez	Fencing	Congressman, Leyte (2022–present); Mayor, Ormoc, Leyte (2016–2022)
Yeng Guiao	Basketball	Member, Pampanga Provincial Board (2001–2004); Vice Governor, Pampanga (2004–2013); Congressman, Pampanga (2013–2016)
Dondon Hontiveros	Basketball	Vice Mayor, Cebu City (2021–2022); Councilor, Cebu City (2019–2021; 2022–present)
Hori Horibata		
Robert Jaworski Jr.	Basketball	Congressman, Pasig City (2004–2007); Vice Mayor, Pasig City (2022–present)
Robert Jaworski	Basketball	Senator (1998–2004)
Mark Joseph		
Arsenio Lacson	Boxing; Association football	Congressman, Manila (1949–1952); Mayor of Manila (1952–1962)
Arsenio Lacson		
Carlos Loyzaga		
Mark Macapagal	Basketball	Councilor, San Simon, Pampanga (2019–2022)
Gilbert Malabanan		
Joey Marquez	Basketball	Vice Mayor, Paranaque (1992–1995); Mayor, Paranaque (1995–2004)
Yoyong Martirez	Basketball	Vice Mayor, Pasig City (2004–2013); Councilor, Pasig City (1995–2004; 2013–2022)
Vergel Meneses	Basketball	Mayor, Bulakan, Bulacan (2019–present)
Marcelino "Mar" Morelos	Basketball	Councilor, Valenzuela City
Roehl Nadurata		
Bobby Pacquiao	Boxing	Councilor, General Santos (2016–2019); Congressman, House of Representatives (Philippines) (2019–2022)
Manny Pacquiao	Boxing; Basketball	Congressman, Sarangani (2010–2016); Senator (2016–2022)
Ambrosio Padilla	Basketball	Solicitor General (1954–1957); Senator (1957–1972)
Franz Pumaren	Basketball	Councilor, Quezon City (2001–2010; 2013–2022); Congressman, Quezon City (2022–present)
Francisco Rabat	Basketball	Governor, Davao Oriental (1978–1986); Mayor, Mati, Davao Oriental (2001–2007)
Dennis Roldan	Basketball	Councilor, Quezon City (1988–1992); Congressman, Quezon City (1992–1995)
Mikee Romero	Basketball; Polo	Congressman, House of Representatives (Philippines) (2019–present)
Monsour del Rosario	Taekwondo	Councilor, Makati City (2010–2016); Congressman, Makati City (2016–2019)
Lou Salvador		
Jack Santiago		
Charo Soriano	Volleyball	Councilor, Tuguegarao, Cagayan (2022–present)
Kristian Rome "Tyson" Sy	Auto Racing	Councilor, Valenzuela City (2013–2022)
Jeric Teng		
Chris Tiu	Basketball	Former Sangguniang Kabataan Chairman & Barangay Kagawad, Barangay Urdaneta, Makati City (2002–2018)
Elias Tolentino		
Simeon Toribio	Athletics	Congressman, Bohol (1946–1953)
Turo Valenzona		
Ervic Vijandre	Basketball	Councilor, San Juan City (2022–present)
Freddie Webb	Basketball	Councilor, Pasay City (1971–1978); Congressman, Paranaque (1987–1992); Senator (1992–1998)
James Yap	Basketball	Councilor, San Juan City (2022–present)
Francis Zamora	Basketball	Mayor, San Juan City (2019–present)

=== South Korea ===
Name	Sport	Position
Choi Yun-hui	Swimming	2nd Vice Minister of Culture, Sports and Tourism (2019–)
Hwang Ho-dong		
Jin Jong-oh		
Kim Young-joo		
Lee Ailesa	Table tennis	Member of National Assembly (2012–2016)
Lee Man-ki		
Lee Yong	Bobsleigh, luge, skeleton	Member of National Assembly (2020–)
Lim O-kyeong	Handball	Member of National Assembly (2020–)
Moon Dae-sung		

=== Sri Lanka ===
Name	Sport	Position
Fredrick de Silva		
Tillakaratne Dilshan	Cricket	Candidate for the 2024 Sri Lankan parliamentary election
Wirantha Fernando	Cricket	Minister of Fisheries of the Western Provincial Council
Sanath Jayasuriya	Cricket	Member of Parliament (2010–2015)
Namal Rajapaksa		
Arjuna Ranatunga	Cricket	Member of Parliament (2001–2020)
Malik Samarawickrama		
Sabdharatnajyoti Saravanamuttu		
Sugath Thilakaratne	Athletics	National list candidate for the 2024 Sri Lankan parliamentary election
Hashan Tillakaratne	Cricket	Member of the Western Provincial Council
T. B. Werapitiya		
Pramodya Wickramasinghe	Cricket	Member of the Southern Provincial Council

=== Taiwan ===
Name	Sport	Position
Cheng Chih-lung	Basketball	Legislative Yuan (?-?)
Chi Cheng	Athletics (Olympic medalist)	Legislative Yuan (1981–1989)
Chuang Chia-chia	Taekwondo (Asian Games medalist)	Director of the Taoyuan Department of Sports
Henry Hsu	Volleyball and association football (both Far Eastern Championship Games)	Member of the Legislative Yuan (1973–1987)
Huang Chih-hsiung	Taekwondo (Olympic medalist)	Member of the Legislative Yuan (2008–2016)
Hung Chun-che		
Jack C. K. Teng		
Yang Chuan-kwang		

=== Thailand ===
Name	Sport	Position
Yaowapa Boorapolchai	Taekwondo (Olympic medalist)	
Sot Chitalada		
Khaosai Galaxy		
Muangchai Kittikasem		
Payao Poontarat	Boxing (Olympic medalist)	MP (2001–2005)
Paradorn Srichaphan	Tennis (Olympic athlete)	

=== Turkey ===
Name	Sport	Position
Mehmet Ali Aybar	Track and Field	
Mustafa Dağıstanlı	Wrestling	
Ünal Karaman		
Faruk Koca		
Alpay Özalan	Football	Member of Parliament from Izmir (II)
Saffet Sancaklı	Football	
Kenan Sofuoğlu	Motorcycle Racing	
Hakan Şükür	Football	
Hamza Yerlikaya	Wrestling	

== Europe ==
=== Albania ===
Name	Sport	Position
Dashnor Bajaziti		
Kreshnik Çipi	Football	Member of Parliament
Salvador Kaçaj		
Edi Rama	Basketball	Minister of Culture, Youth and Sports Mayor of Tirana Prime Minister of Albania Minister of Foreign Affairs

=== Austria ===
Name	Sport	Position
Ingo Appelt		
Kira Grünberg	Track and Field	Member of Parliament
Elmar Lichtenegger		
Jürgen Mandl		
Patrick Ortlieb		
Karin Prokop		
Liese Prokop		

=== Belarus ===
Name	Sport	Position
Dzmitry Baskau		
Nastassia Mironchyk-Ivanova		
Vladimir Parfenovich		

=== Belgium ===
Name	Sport	Position
Jean-Marie Dedecker	Judo	Senator (1999–2007); Member of the Flemish Parliament (2004–2007); MP (2007–2014; 2019–); Mayor of Middelkerke (2019–)
Joseph d'Oultremont		
Michel Dighneef	Football	
Veerle Geerinckx		
Ulla Werbrouck		
Marc Wilmots	Football	

=== Bosnia and Herzegovina ===
Name	Sport	Position
Samir Avdić	Basketball	Mayor of Sarajevo (2025–present)

=== Bulgaria ===
Name	Sport	Position
Slavcho Binev		
Boyko Borisov		
Georgi Glouchkov		
Krasen Kralev	Long-distance running	Minister of Youth and Sports of Bulgaria (2014–2017)
Vesela Letcheva		
Yordan Letchkov	Association football	Mayor of Sliven (2003–2010)
Nonka Matova		

=== Croatia ===
Name	Sport	Position
Franjo Arapović		
Danira Bilić		
Perica Bukić		
Mirko Cro Cop	Mixed martial arts	Member of Parliament (2003–2008)
Nika Fleiss		
Ante Ledić		
Sandra Perković	Athletics (Discus throw)	Member of Parliament (2015–present)
Damir Škaro		
Luciano Sušanj		

=== Czech Republic ===
Name	Sport	Position
Augustin Bubník		
Jaroslav Bžoch		
Milan Hnilička		
Jakub Janda		
Karel Kula		
Jiří Šlégr		
Filip Turek		

=== Denmark ===
Name	Sport	Position
Erik Bo Andersen	Football	
Michael Fenger		
Katrine Fruelund		
Jakob Larsen		
Knud Lundberg		
Henriette Mikkelsen		
Joachim B. Olsen	Athletics (Shot put)	Member of the Folketing
Erik Veje Rasmussen		
Ulrik Wilbek	Handball coaching	Mayor of Viborg

==== Faroe Islands ====
Name	Sport	Position
Aksel V. Johannesen		
Kaj Leo Johannesen		
Poul Michelsen		
Bárður á Steig Nielsen		
Annika Olsen		

==== Greenland ====
Name	Sport	Position
Jens-Frederik Nielsen		

=== Estonia ===
Name	Sport	Position
Jüri Jaanson		
Baruto Kaito		
Madis Kallas		
Anastassia Kovalenko-Kõlvart		
Erki Nool	Athletics (decathlon)	
Erika Salumäe		
Jaak Salumets		
Heino Sisask		
Kristina Šmigun-Vähi		
Jüri Tamm		
Toomas Tõniste		
Jaak Uudmäe	Athletics (triple jump, long jump)	

=== Finland ===
Name	Sport	Position
Arto Bryggare	Track and field	MP (1995–1997, 2003–2007)
Sari Essayah	Racewalking	MP (2003–2007, 2015–present)
Timo Furuholm		
Kelpo Gröndahl	Wrestling	MP (1962–1970)
Tony Halme	Professional wrestling	MP (2003–2007)
Lotta Hamari	Basketball	MP (2023–present)
Heikki Hasu	Nordic skier	MP (1962–1970)
Kuuno Honkonen	Athletics	MP (1958–1979)
Shawn Huff		
Antti Kalliomäki	Athletics	MP (1983–2011)
Hanna Kosonen		
Kalervo Kummola		
Eeles Landström		
Marjo Matikainen-Kallström	Skiing	MP (2004–2015)
Juha Mieto	Cross-country skiing	MP (2003–2007)
Eino Pekkala	Decathlon	MP (1927–1930, 1945–1948)
Sylvi Saimo		
Ari Vatanen	World Rally Championship	Member of European Parliament (1999–2009)
Lasse Virén	Athletics (distances)	MP (1999–2007, 2010–2011)

=== France ===
Name	Sport	Position
Lucien Besset		
Alain Calmat		
Éric Di Meco		
Amédée Domenech	Rugby union	
David Douillet		
Guy Drut	Athletics (hurdles)	
Christian Estrosi		
Laura Flessel	Fencing	Minister of Sports
Francis Hardy		
Jacques Heuclin		
Éric Husson	Rugby	Member of Parliament
Chantal Jouanno		
Amélie Oudéa-Castéra		
Jacques Sanglier		
Sarah Soilihi		
Patrick Tambay	Motorsport	Deputy Mayor of Le Cannet
Maurice Trintignant	Motorsport	Mayor

=== Germany ===
Name	Sport	Position
Verena Bentele	Biathlon	SPD, Federal Ministry of Labour and Social Affairs; disabilities commissioner (2014–2018)
Antje Buschschulte	Swimming	Alliance 90/The Greens, Candidate for the 2021 Saxony-Anhalt state election
Heike Drechsler		
Ruth Fuchs	Javelin throw	Member of the Bundestag, Party of Democratic Socialism (1990, 1992–2002, Member of the Thuringian Landtag, PDS, 2004–2009)
Eberhard Gienger	Gymnastics	Member of the German Bundestag, CDU (2002–2021)
Georg Hackl	Luge	Christian Social Union in Bavaria, district Berchtesgadener Land
Gunhild Hoffmeister		
Michael Köhler		
Jens Lehmann		
Claudia Pechstein	Speed skating	Christian Democratic Union of Germany, direct candidate for Berlin Treptow-Köpenick
Barbara Petzold		
Oliver Ruhnert	Football	City councillor and candidate in the 2025 German federal election
Diana Sartor		
Sylvia Schenk		
Täve Schur		
Ilona Slupianek	Shot put	Member of the Volkskammer (1976 to 1986) in the former the German Democratic Republic
Rudolf Thanner		
Gerhard Trabert		
Frank Ullrich	Biathlon	Member of the German Bundestag, SPD (since 2021)

=== Greece ===
Name	Sport	Position
Georgios Anatolakis	Football	Former Member of Parliament
Stavroula Antonakou		
Eleni Avlonitou		
Angelos Charisteas		
Menelaos Chatzigeorgiou		
Pyrros Dimas		
Panagiotis Fasoulas	Basketball	Former Mayor of Piraeus
Giannis Ioannidis	Basketball	Former Member of Parliament
Anna Karamanli		
Pantelis Karasevdas	Sport shooter	Former Member of Parliament
Giorgos Katsibardis		
Vasilis Kikilias		
Konstantinos Kotzias		
Konstandinos Koukodimos		
Elena Kountoura		
Grigoris Lambrakis		
Tasos Mitropoulos		
Vasilis Papageorgopoulos		
Karolos Papoulias		
Nikos Pappas		
Voula Patoulidou	Athletics (hurdles)	
Maria Polyzou	Marathon	
Sofia Sakorafa		
Paschalis Tountouris		
Antonis Tritsis		
George Vassilakopoulos		
Theodoros Zagorakis		

=== Hungary ===
Name	Sport	Position
Zsolt Borkai	Gymnastics	Mayor of Győr
Attila Czene	Swimming	
Béla Dáner	Gymnastics; Athletics (high jump)	Member of the National Assembly
István Friedrich	Association football	Prime Minister
Dezső Gyarmati		
Vilmos Kátai-Németh		
Viktor Orbán	Association football	Prime Minister
Pál Schmitt	Fencing	President

=== Iceland ===
Name	Sport	Position
Ingi Björn Albertsson		
Lúðvík Bergvinsson		
Hanna Katrín Friðriksson	Handball	Member of Althing (2016–present)
Albert Guðmundsson	Association football	Member of Althing (1974–1987)
Þorgerður Katrín Gunnarsdóttir		
Pétur Georg Markan		
Ellert Schram		
Geir Sveinsson		
Willum Þór Þórsson	Association football	Member of Althing (2013–2016)

=== Ireland ===
Name	Sport	Position
Dermot Ahern	Windsurfing (Ulster champion)	TD for Louth (1987–2011)
Bob Aylward	Hurling (County Kilkenny intercounty)	Senator (1973–1974)
Richard Belton	Bridge (national representative)	Senator (1969–1973)
Edward Bligh	Cricket (first-class)	MP for Athboy (1800)
John Boland	Tennis (Olympic medalist)	MP for South Kerry (1900–1918)
Enda Bonner	Gaelic football (Donegal GAA)	Senator (2007–2012); Donegal County Councillor (1999–2019) for Glenties
Joseph Brennan	Gaelic football (Donegal GAA)	TD for Donegal West (1951–1961), Donegal South-West (1961–1969), Donegal–Leitrim (1969–1977), and Donegal (1977–1980)
Francie Brolly	Gaelic football (Derry GAA)	Northern Ireland MLA for East Londonderry (2003–2010)
Seán Brosnan	Gaelic football (Kerry GAA)	TD for Cork North-East (1969–1973; 1974–1979); Senator (1973–1974); MEP for Ireland (1977–1979)
John Browne	Hurling (Wexford GAA)	TD for Wexford (1982–2016)
Hugh Byrne	Gaelic football (Wexford GAA) and hurling (Kildare GAA)	TD for Wexford (1981–1989; 1992–2002)
Patrick Cahill	Gaelic football (Wexford GAA) and hurling (Kildare GAA)	TD for Kerry–Limerick West (1921–1923) and Kerry (1923–1927)
Mark Clinton	Gaelic football (Meath GAA)	TD for Dublin County (1961–1969), Dublin County North (1969–1977), and Dublin County West (1977–1981); MEP for Leinster (1979–1989)
Paddy Clohessy	Hurling (Limerick GAA)	TD for Limerick East (1957–1969)
Eamonn Coghlan	Athletics (Olympic athlete)	Senator (2011–2016)
Clement Coughlan	Gaelic football (Donegal GAA)	TD for Donegal (1980–1983)
Hugh Coveney	Yachting (Admiral's Cup)	TD for Cork South-Central (1981–1982; 1982–1987; 1994–1998); Lord Mayor of Cork (1982–1983)
Brian Cowen	Gaelic football (Offaly GAA)	Taoiseach (2008–2011)
Denny Curran	Gaelic football (Kerry GAA)	Tralee Urban Councillor
Jimmy Deenihan	Gaelic football (Kerry GAA); Rugby union (Garryowen Football Club)	Senator (1983–1987); TD for Kerry North (1987–2011) and Kerry North–West Limerick (2011–2016)
Michael Donnellan	Gaelic football (Galway GAA)	TD for Galway East (1943–1948; 1961–1964) and Galway North (1948–1961)
John Donnellan	Gaelic football (Galway GAA)	TD for Galway East (1964–1969; 1977–1981), Galway North-East (1969–1977), and Galway West (1981–1989)
John Doyle	Hurling (Tipperary GAA)	Senator (1969–1973); Candidate in the 1969 Irish general election for Tipperary North
John Duffy	Gaelic football (Donegal GAA)	Candidate in the 2011 Irish general election for Donegal South-West
Kenny Egan	Boxing (Olympic medalist)	South Dublin County Councillor (2014–2024)
James Ennis	Cricket (first-class for Dublin University)	Candidate in the 1932, 1933, and 1937 Irish general elections at Dublin County
Martin Ferris	Gaelic football (Kerry GAA)	TD for Kerry North (2002–2011), Kerry North–West Limerick (2011–2016), and Kerry (2016–2020)
Jack Finlay	Hurling (Laois GAA)	TD for Laois–Offaly (1933–1938)
Michael Finneran	Gaelic football (Roscommon GAA)	TD for Longford–Roscommon (2002–2007) and Roscommon–South Leitrim (2007–2011); Senator (1989–2002)
Peter Fitzpatrick	Gaelic football (Louth GAA)	TD for Louth (2011–2024)
Seán Flanagan	Gaelic football (Mayo GAA)	TD for Mayo South (1951–1969) and Mayo East (1969–1977)
Des Foley	Gaelic football and hurling (Dublin GAA)	TD for Dublin County (1965–1969) and Dublin County North (1969–1973)
Graham Geraghty	Gaelic football (Meath GAA)	Candidate in the 2007 Irish general election for Meath West
Hugh Gibbons	Gaelic football (Roscommon GAA)	TD for Roscommon (1965–1969) and Roscommon–Leitrim (1969–1977)
Michael Gleeson	Gaelic football (Kerry GAA)	Mayor of Killarney
Jim Glennon	Rugby union (international)	TD for Dublin North (2002–2007); Senator (2000–2002)
Oliver St. John Gogarty	Association football (Preston North End F.C. and Bohemian F.C.)	Senator (1922–1936)
Jackie Healy-Rae	Gaelic football and hurling (Kerry Senior Hurling Championship)	TD for Kerry South (1997–2011)
John Hegarty	Gaelic football (Wexford GAA)	Wexford County Councillor (2014–2024)
Michael Herbert	Hurling (Limerick GAA)	TD for Limerick East (1969–1981); MEP for Ireland (1973–1979)
Tony Herbert	Gaelic football and hurling (Limerick GAA and Dublin GAA)	Senator (1977–1981; 1982–1983)
Lorraine Higgins	Golf (national finalist)	Senator (2011–2016)
Colm Hilliard	Gaelic football and hurling (Meath GAA)	TD for Meath (1982–1997)
Paddy Holohan	Mixed martial arts (TUF 18)	South Dublin County Councillor for Tallaght South (2019–)
Samuel Irwin	Rugby union (national team); Cricket	MP for Queen's University of Belfast (1948–1961)
Manus Kelly	Rally driving	Donegal County Councillor
Seán Kelly	Gaelic football (Kilcummin GAA)	MEP for South (2009–)
Henry Kenny	Gaelic football (Mayo GAA)	TD for Mayo South (1954–1969) and Mayo West (1969–1975)
Séamus Kirk	Gaelic football (Louth GAA)	TD for Louth (1982–2016)
Garry Laffan	Hurling (Wexford GAA)	Wexford County Councillor (2019–)
Patrick Lalor	Hurling (Laois GAA)	TD for Laois–Offaly (1961–1981); MEP for Leinster (1979–1994)
Gordon Lambert	Field hockey (Three Rock Rovers Hockey Club)	Senator (1977–?)
Paddy Lane	Rugby union (national team)	MEP for Munster (1989–1994)
Liam Lawlor	Hurling (GAA Interprovincial Championship)	TD for Dublin County West (1977–1981), Dublin West (1982; 1987–2002)
Patrick Lenihan	Hurling (Westmeath GAA)	TD for Longford–Westmeath (1965–1970)
Jack Lynch	Gaelic football and hurling (Cork GAA)	Taoiseach (1966–1973; 1977–1979)
Seamus Mallon	Gaelic football (Armagh GAA)	Deputy First Minister of Northern Ireland (1998–2001)
Brian McEniff	Gaelic football (Donegal GAA)	Donegal County Councillor (1979–?)
Basil McFarland	Rugby union (international)	Northern Ireland Senator (1945–1950); Mayor of Derry (1939–1940; 1945–1950)
Ian McGarvey	Association football	Donegal County Councillor (2004–2023)
Edward McGuire	Gaelic football (Roscommon GAA)	Senator (1948–1961)
Gerry McLoughlin	Rugby union (1983 British Lions tour to New Zealand)	Mayor of Limerick (2012–2013)
Justin McNulty	Gaelic football (Armagh GAA)	Northern Ireland MLA for Newry and Armagh (2016–)
Jack McQuillan	Gaelic football (Roscommon GAA)	TD for Roscommon (1948–1965)
Anthony Molloy	Gaelic football (Donegal GAA)	Donegal County Councillor (2019–)
Sir Henry Mulholland, 1st Baronet	Cricket (first-class at Cambridge University)	MP for Down (1921–1929) and Ards (1929–1945)
Jimmy Mulroy	Gaelic football (Louth GAA)	Senator (1987–1989)
Sheelagh Murnaghan	Field hockey (national team)	MP for Queen's University of Belfast (1961–1969)
James Myles	Rugby (national team)	TD for Donegal (1923–1937) and Donegal East (1937–1943)
Des O'Grady	Gaelic football (Cork GAA)	Cork County Councillor (2014–2019)
Batt O'Keeffe	Gaelic football (Cork GAA)	Senator (1989–1992); TD for Cork South-Central (1987–1989; 1992–2007) and Cork North-West (2007–2011)
John O'Leary	Gaelic football (Dublin GAA)	Candidate in the 2007 Irish general election for Dublin North
Donogh O'Malley	Rugby union (Connacht, Ulster, and Munster)	TD for Limerick East (1954–1968)
Tom O'Reilly	Gaelic football (Cavan GAA)	TD for Cavan (1944–1948)
Grace O'Sullivan	Surfing (national champion)	Senator (2016–2019); MEP for South (2019–2024)
Barney Rock	Gaelic football (Dublin GAA)	Candidate in the 1991 Dublin Corporation election in the Finglas LEA
Caitríona Ruane	Tennis (Fed Cup)	Northern Ireland MLA for South Down (2003–2017)
Dan Spring	Gaelic football (Kerry GAA)	TD for Kerry North (1943–1981)
Dick Spring	Gaelic football (Kerins O'Rahilly's GAA); Hurling (Crotta O'Neill's)	Tánaiste (1982–1987; 1993–1994; 1994–1997)
Austin Stack	Gaelic football (Kerry GAA)	TD for West Kerry (1918–1921), Kerry–Limerick West (1921–1923), and Kerry (1923–1927)
Martin Storey	Hurling (Wexford GAA)	Wexford County Councillor (2013–2014)
Philip Sutcliffe Snr	Boxer (Olympic medalist)	Dublin City Councillor (2024–)
Oscar Traynor	Association football (Belfast Celtic F.C.)	Minister for Defence (1939–1948; 1951–1954)
Jim Tunney	Gaelic football (Dublin GAA)	Lord Mayor of Dublin (1984–1985)
Éamon de Valera	Rugby (Munster Rugby)	President of Ireland (1959–1973); Taoiseach (1937–1948; 1951–1954; 1957–1959)
Brian Whelahan	Hurling (Offaly GAA)	Birr Town Councillor
John Wilson	Gaelic football (Cavan GAA)	Tánaiste (1990–1993)
William McConnell Wilton	Association football (Institute F.C.)	Northern Ireland Senator (1945–1953)
G. V. Wright	Gaelic football (Dublin GAA); Basketball (international level)	TD for Dublin North (1987–1989; 1997–2007); Senate (1982; 1989–1997)

=== Italy ===
Name	Sport	Position
Maria Teresa Baldini	Basketball	Chamber of Deputies (2019–2022)
Paolo Barelli	Swimming (Olympic athlete)	Senator of the Republic
Giampiero Boniperti		
Josefa Idem	Canoeing (Olympic medalist)	Senator of the Republic; Minister of Sport
Ferdinando Latteri	Motorsport	Chamber of Deputies (1987–1994, 2006–2011)
Pietro Mennea	Athletics (Olympic medalist)	MEP (1999–2004)
Carolina Morace		
Gianni Rivera		
Marco Schenardi		
Giusy Versace		

=== Liechtenstein ===
Name	Sport	Position
Bettina Petzold-Mähr	Volleyball (2009 Games of the Small States of Europe)	Member of the Landtag (2021–present)

=== Lithuania ===
Name	Sport	Position
Viktorija Čmilytė-Nielsen		

=== Luxembourg ===
Name	Sport	Position
Josy Barthel	Athletics (middle distances)	
Camille Dimmer		
Colette Flesch		
Jean Hamilius		
Norbert Haupert		
Nancy Kemp-Arendt		
Anne Kremer		
Nicolas Kremer		
Pierre Mellina		
Tessy Scholtes		

=== Macedonia ===
Name	Sport	Position
Borko Ristovski		

=== Moldova ===
Name	Sport	Position
Said-Muhmat Amaev		
Vasile Bolea		
Nicolae Juravschi		
Chiril Lucinschi		
Octavian Țîcu		
Constantin Țuțu		
Vadim Vacarciuc		

=== Montenegro ===
Name	Sport	Position
Nikola Janović		
Andrija Popović		
Janko Vučinić	Boxing	MP (2012–2019)

=== Netherlands ===
Name	Sport	Position
Roy Bottse	Athletics (Olympic athlete)	Candidate in the 2016 Curaçao general election
Ismail el Abassi	Football (FC Utrecht)	Member of the Tweede Kamer
Jeanet van der Laan		
André du Pon		
James Sharpe	Athletics (hurdles; Olympic athlete)	Member of the Tweede Kamer (2010)
Hans Smolders		
Erica Terpstra	Athletics (Olympic medalist)	Member of the Tweede Kamer (2010)
Ruud Vreeman	Indoor hockey	Member of the Tweede Kamer (1994–1997); Member of the Eerste Kamer (2015–2016)

=== Norway ===
Name	Sport	Position
Hans Bergsland		
Ivar Egeberg		
Eilert Eilertsen		
Håkon Fimland		
Jon Fossum		
Jan Gulbrandsen		
Gunnar Gundersen		
Arne Hamarsland		
Anne Sophie Hunstad		
Peter Mentz Jebsen		
Linda Medalen		
Tove Paule		
Anders Rambekk		
Børre Rognlien		
Frode Scheie		
Helge Sivertsen		
Morten Strand		
Tom Tvedt		

=== Poland ===
Name	Sport	Position
Witold Bańka	Athletics (400 meter)	Minister of Sport and Tourism (2015–2019)
Tomasz Frankowski		
Aleksandra Gajewska	Basketball	Member of the Sejm (2019–), secretary of state of the Ministry of Family, Labour and Social Policy (2023–), member of the Warsaw City Council (2014–2019)
Adam Korol		
Roman Kosecki	Association football	Member of the Sejm (2005–2019)
Janusz Kupcewicz		
Cezary Kucharski		
Grzegorz Lato	Association football	Senator (2001–2005)
Tomasz Lipiec	Athletics (Race Walking)	Minister of Sport (2005–2007)
Jerzy Młynarczyk		
Jacek Niedźwiedzki	Badminton	Member of the Sejm (2023–)
Małgorzata Olejnik	Archery (Paralympic Medalist)	Member of the Sejm (2005–2007)
Paweł Papke	Volleyball	Member of the Sejm (2015–)
Erwina Ryś-Ferens		
Rafał Siemaszko	Football	Member of the Sejm (2023–)
Jerzy Sobera		
Apoloniusz Tajner	Nordic combined skiing	Member of the Sejm (2023–)
Jan Tomaszewski	Association football	Member of the Sejm (2011–2015)
Bogdan Wenta		
Janusz Wójcik	Association football	Member of the Sejm (2005–2007)
Andrzej Wyglenda	Motor sports (Motorcycle speedway)	Member of the Sejm (1985–1989)

=== Romania ===
Name	Sport	Position
Octavian Bellu		
Allen Coliban		
Anghel Iordănescu		
Lia Manoliu		
Cătălin Moroșanu		
Gabriel Mureșan		
Ilie Năstase	Tennis	
Nicolae Rainea		
Marius Stan		
Gabriela Szabo		
Dan Tulpan		

=== Russia ===
Name	Sport	Position
Andrey Arshavin		
Rima Batalova		
Fedor Emelianenko		
Arsen Fadzaev		
Viacheslav Fetisov	Ice hockey	
Valery Gazzaev		
Valeri Gladilin		
Olga Glatskikh		
Svetlana Ishmouratova		
Alina Kabaeva		
Aleksandr Karelin	Wrestling (Greco-Roman)	
Anatoly Karpov	Chess	
Garry Kasparov	Chess	
Murat Khasanov		
Batu Khasikov		
Svetlana Khorkina	Artistic gymnastics	
Pavel Kolobkov		
Andrey Lavrov		
Oleg Malyshkin		
Dmitri Nossov		
Roman Pavlyuchenko		
Irina Rodnina	Figure skating (pairs)	
Yana Romanova		
Marat Safin	Tennis	
Dmitri Sautin		
Anton Shipulin		
Anton Sikharulidze		
Alexey Smertin		
Viktor Sysoyev		
Sergei Tchepikov		
Vladislav Tretiak	Ice hockey	
Nikolai Valuev	Boxing	
Yury Vlasov		
Alexey Voyevoda		
Lyubov Yegorova	Nordic skiing	
Svetlana Zhurova		

=== San Marino ===
Name	Sport	Position
Gian Nicola Berti		
Giorgio Crescentini		
Dalibor Riccardi	Association Football	Captain Regent (2024–2025)
Matteo Rossi	Association Football	Captain Regent (2025–present)
Nicola Selva	Athletics (Olympics athlete)	Captain Regent (2019)

=== Serbia ===
Name	Sport	Position
Vladimir Batez		
Aleksandar Bundalo		
Zoran Gajić		
Marko Kešelj		
Ratko Nikolić		
Aleksandar Šapić		
Rašo Vučinić		

=== Slovakia ===
Name	Sport	Position
Jozef Čapkovič		
Mária Ďurišinová		
Dušan Galis		
Milan Haborák	Athletics (shot-put)	Vice-chairman of Hnutie Vpred
Ján Krošlák		
Karol Kučera		
Vincent Lukáč		
Jirko Malchárek		
Lukáš Pellegrini		
Jozef Pribilinec		
Peter Šťastný	Ice hockey (NHL)	MEP for Slovakia (2004–2014)
Romana Tabak		
Viliam Tankó		
Dušan Tittel		
Erik Vlček		

=== Slovenia ===
Name	Sport	Position
Alenka Bikar	Athletics (Olympic athlete)	Member of the Državni zbor (2012–?)
Katja Koren	Alpine skiing (Olympic medalist)	Candidate
Marta Kos		
Boris Popovič		
Miro Steržaj	Nine-pin bowling	Mayor of Ljutomer
Peter Vilfan		
Gregor Židan		

=== Spain ===
Name	Sport	Position
José Ángel Antelo		
Vicente Barrera		
Ruth Beitia	Athletics (high jump)	Member of the Parliament of Cantabria (2008–2019)
Mateu Cañellas		
Kini Carrasco		
Marta Domínguez		
Fernando Gómez		
Pepu Hernández	Basketball (coach)	Member of the City Council of Madrid (2019–2021)
Andoni Imaz	Football	Sports councillor of Tolosa (2003–2007)
Javier Imbroda	Basketball (coach)	Minister of Education and Sports of Andalusia (2019–2022)
Luis Minguela		
Carlos Pollán		
Juan Manuel Prieto		
Miguel Reina		
Tomás Reñones		
María José Rienda	Alpine skiing	President of the Consejo Superior de Deportes and Secretary of State of Sports (2018–2020)
Emilio Sáez		
Cristian Toro		
Borja Vivas	Athletics (shot put)	Sports councillor of Málaga (2023–present)

=== Sweden ===
Name	Sport	Position
Abgar Barsom		
Thomas Bodström		
Georg Branting		
Bino Drummond		
Yngve Häckner	Athletics (javelin)	Member of the Andra kammaren (1948–1952)
Lasse Johansson		
David Lega		
Tony Ring		
Anna Sjödin		
Anders Wilander		

=== Switzerland ===
Name	Sport	Position
Rocco Cattaneo		
Ruth Humbel		
Marcel Meyer de Stadelhofen		
Bruno Michaud		
Lucia Näfen-Zehnder	Skiing	Municipal councillor at Brig-Glis (2008–?)
Franz Nietlispach		
Jacqueline de Quattro		
Rudolf Reichling		
Celine van Till		
Hansjörg Trachsel		
Paul Wyss		

=== Ukraine ===
Name	Sport	Position
Volodymyr Babayev	Association football	Acting Governor of Kharkiv Oblast (2010); Member of the Kharkiv Oblast Council (2020–); Member of the Kharkiv City Council (1986–1994)
Zhan Beleniuk	Greco-Roman wrestling (Olympic medalist)	People's Deputy for Servant of the People (2019–)
Yuriy Bilonoh	Athletics (shot put) (Olympic medalist)	Candidate in the 2014 Ukrainian parliamentary election for the 133rd (Odesa-Kyivskyi) constituency
Olena Bilosiuk		
Oleg Blokhin	Association football (international)	People's Deputy for Hromada, then for the Communist Party of Ukraine (1998–2006)
Albina Bordunova	Swimming (Olympic athlete)	Member of the Zaporizhzhia City Council (2006–2010)
Valeriy Borzov	Athletics (sprint) (Olympic medalist)	Minister of Youth and Sports (1991–1996); People's Deputy for the People's Movement of Ukraine, then for the Social Democratic Party of Ukraine (united) (1998–2006)
Sergey Bubka	Athletics (pole vault) (Olympic medalist)	People's Deputy for the Party of Regions (2002–2006)
Vasyl Bubka	Athletics (pole vault) (Olympic athlete)	Member of the Donetsk Oblast Council (2010–)
Yevhen Chervonenko	Motorsport	Minister of Transportation and Communication (2005); People's Deputy for Our Ukraine (2002–2005)
Andriy Deryzemlya	Biathlon (European champion)	Member of the Chernihiv City Council (2015–); Candidate in the 2014 Ukrainian parliamentary election for the 205th (Chernihiv) constituency
Nataliya Dobrynska	Heptathlon (Olympic medalist)	Candidate in the 2012 Ukrainian parliamentary election for the 11th (Vinnytsia) constituency Member of Vinnytsia Oblast Council (2010–2015)
Petro Dyminskyi	Association football	People's Deputy for Our Ukraine (2002–2006)
Artem Fedetskyi	Association football (international)	Candidate in the 2019 Ukrainian parliamentary election for the 118th (Lviv) constituency
Vadym Gutzeit	Fencing (Olympic medalist)	Minister of Youth and Sports (2020–); Candidate in the 2019 Ukrainian parliamentary election for the Servant of the People
Vladyslav Helzin	Association football (top league)	Member of the Donetsk Oblast Council (2010–)
Ivan Heshko	Athletics (middle-distance) (Olympic athlete)	Candidate for mayor of Kitsman (2020); Member of the Chernivtsi Oblast Council (2015–2020); Member of the Kitsman City Council (2010–2015); Member of the Chernivtsi City Council (2006–2010)
Stanislav Horuna	Karate (Olympic medalist)	Member of the Lviv Raion Council (2020–)
Olena Hovorova		
Olga Kharlan	Fencing (Olympic medalist)	Candidate in the 2012 Ukrainian parliamentary election for the Party of Regions; Member of the Mykolaiv City Council (2010–2015)
Vitali Klitschko	Boxing (world champion)	Mayor of Kyiv (2014–); People's Deputy for UDAR (2012–2014); Member of the Kyiv City Council (2006–2012)
Yana Klochkova		
Oleksiy Kucherenko	Futsal (top league)	Minister of Housing and Communal Services (2007–2010); People's Deputy for Our Ukraine (2006–2007) and Batkivshchyna (2019–); People's Deputy for the 80th (Vasylivka) constituency (1998–2002); Governor of Zaporizhzhia Oblast (2000–2001)
Serhiy Kvit	Fencing	Minister of Education and Science of Ukraine (2014–2016); People's Deputy for the Petro Poroshenko Bloc (2014)
Heorhiy Mazurashu	Athletics (middle-distance)	People's Deputy for the 203rd (Novoselytsia) constituency (2019–)
Stanislav Medvedenko	Basketball (international)	Candidate in the 2019 Ukrainian parliamentary election for the 214th (Kyiv-Dniprovskyi) constituency
Vadym Merikov	Kickboxing	Governor of Mykolaiv Oblast (2014–2016); People's Deputy for Batkivshchyna (2014); Member of the Mykolaiv Oblast Council (2010–2014); Member of the Mykolaiv City Council (2005–2010)
Oleksandr Onyshchenko	Equestrian (Olympic athlete)	People's Deputy for the 93rd (Myronivka) constituency (2012–2019)
Oleh Osukhovskyi	Association football	People's Deputy for the 152nd (Rivne) constituency (2012–2019)
Viktor Postol	Boxing (world champion)	Member of the Velyka Dymerka Town Counci (2017–2018)
Serhiy Postrekhin	Canoeing (Olympic medalist)	Candidate for mayor of Kherson (2006)
Viktor Prokopenko	Association football (top league)	People's Deputy for the Party of Regions (2006–2007)
Anatoliy Pysarenko	Weightlifting (world champion)	People's Deputy for Social Democratic Party of Ukraine (united) (2002–2006)
Oleksii Reznikov	Motorsport	Minister of Defense (2021–); Deputy Prime Minister (2020–2021); Secretary of the Kyiv City Council (2014–2019); Member of the Kyiv City Council (2008–2014)
Hanna Rizatdinova	Rhythmic gymnastics (Olympic medalist)	Candidate in the 2019 Ukrainian parliamentary election for the 98th (Yahotyn) constituency
Olha Saladukha	Athletics (triple jump) (Olympic medalist)	People's Deputy for Servant of the People (2019–)
Viktor Savchenko	Boxing (Olympic medalist)	People's Deputy for the 80th (Dnipropetrovsk-Leninskyi) constituency (1994–1998)
Andriy Shevchenko	Association football (international)	Candidate in the 2012 Ukrainian parliamentary election for Ukraine – Forward!
Ihor Shopin	Association football (top league)	Mayor of Novoaidar (2015–)
Oleksandr Shovkovskyi	Association football (international)	Member of the Kyiv City Council (2020–)
Viktor Smyrnov	Swimming (Paralympic medalist)	Candidate in the 2014 Ukrainian parliamentary election for the 47th (Sloviansk) constituency
Volodymyr Sydorenko	Boxing (Olympic medalist)	Candidate for mayor of Enerhodar (2020)
Denys Sylantyev	Swimming (Olympic medalist)	People's Deputy for the Radical Party of Oleh Liashko (2014–2019)
Valentyn Symonenko	Mountaineering	Acting Prime Minister (1992); First Deputy Prime Minister (1992); People's Deputy for the 297th (Odesa-Malynovskyi) constituency (1990–1992) and the 298th (Odesa-Pivnichnyi) constituency (1994–1998); Representative of the President in Odesa Oblast (1992); Mayor of Odesa (1983–1992)
Elbrus Tedeyev	Wrestling (Olympic medalist)	People's Deputy for the Party of Regions (2006–2014)
Oleksiy Tsybko	Rugby union (international)	Mayor of Smila (2015–2018); Candidate in the 2014 Ukrainian parliamentary election for the Ukrainian Civil Movement; Candidate in the 2019 Ukrainian parliamentary election for the 198th (Smila) constituency
Roman Virastyuk	Athletics (shot put) (Olympic athlete)	Candidate in the 2019 Ukrainian parliamentary election for the 84th (Tysmenytsia) constituency Candidate in the 2014 Ukrainian parliamentary election for the 84th (Tysmenytsia) constituency
Vasyl Virastyuk	Strongman (world champion)	People's Deputy for the 87th (Nadvirna) constituency (2021–)
Alexander Volkov	Basketball (Olympic medalist)	People's Deputy for Our Ukraine, then for the Party of Regions (2005–2014)
Andriy Vorobey	Association football (international)	Member of the Kurakhove City Council (2020–)
Viktor Yanukovych	Motorsport	People's Deputy for the Party of Regions (2006–2014)
Georgii Zantaraia	Judo (World champion)	Member of the Kyiv City Council (2020–)
Natalia Zhukova	Chess (world champion)	Candidate in the 2019 Ukrainian parliamentary election for the Movement of New Forces

=== United Kingdom ===
Name	Sport	Position
Sir Thomas Abdy, 1st Baronet, of Albyns	Cricket (Marylebone Cricket Club)	MP for Lyme Regis (1847–1852)
Lord Aboyne	Cricket (first-class)	MP for East Grinstead (1818–1830) and Huntingdonshire (1830–1831); Member of the House of Lords (Note: As Marquess of Huntly)
Gerald Abrahams	Chess	Candidate in the 1945 United Kingdom general election at Sheffield Hallam
Charles Allen	Rugby union	MP for Stroud (1900–1918)
Andrew Anderson, Lord Anderson	Association football (Queen's Park F.C.)	MP for North Ayrshire (1910–1911)
David Anderson	Shooting	MP for Dumfriesshire (1963–1964)
David Anderson	Athlete (Commonwealth Games athlete)	Member of the House of Keys (2001–2018)
George Anderson	Association football (200 appearances for Aberdeen F.C.)	Aberdeen Town Councillor
Tonia Antoniazzi	Rugby (international player)	MP for Gower (2017–)
Robert Antrobus	Cricket	London County Councillor for St George Hanover Square (1889–1904; became alderman in 1898)
Arthur Appleby	Cricket (first-class)	Alderman of Lancashire County Council
Jeffrey Archer	Cricket (Marylebone Cricket Club)	MP for Louth (1969–1974); Member of the House of Lords
Vernon Armitage	Cricket (one first-class match for Cambridge University)	Vice-chairman of Lancashire County Council
Alex Arthur	Boxing (WBO Super Featherweight Champion)	Alba Party candidate in the 2021 Scottish Parliament election
James Lloyd Ashbury	Yachting (America's Cup)	MP for Brighton (1874–1880)
Hubert Ashton	Cricket; Association football	MP for Chelmsford (1950–1964)
Lord Astor of Hever	Rackets (Olympic medalist)	Alderman of London County Council (1922–1925); MP for Dover (1922–1945); Member of the House of Lords
Robert Awdry	Cricket (first-class)	Chairman of Wiltshire County Council (1946–1949)
William Bagge	Cricket (first-class)	MP for West Norfolk (1837–1857; 1865–1880)
Matt Baker	Association football	Candidate in the 2010 Leeds City Council election at Weetwood
Bannerman of Kildonan	Rugby union	Chairman of the Scottish Liberal Party (1954–1964); Member of the House of Lords (1967–1969)
Charles James Barnett	Cricket (first-class)	MP for Maidstone (1831–1835)
Henry Barnett	Cricket (first-class)	MP for Woodstock (1865–1874)
Richard Barnett	Shooting (Olympic athlete); Chess	MP for St Pancras West (1916–1918) and St Pancras South West (1918–1929)
Lord Barrymore	Cricket (first-class)	MP for Heytesbury (1791–1793)
Hamar Bass	Cricket (first-class)	MP for Tamworth (1878–1885) and West Staffordshire (1885–1898)
Richard Bateman	Cricket (one first-class match for Hampshire)	Hampshire County Councillor for Aldershot East
Mark Hanbury Beaufoy	Association football (1879 FA Cup final)	MP for Kennington (1889–1895)
Russell Bencraft	Cricket (first-class)	Southampton town councillor
Reginald Bennett	Yachting	MP for Gosport and Fareham (1950–1974) and Fareham (1974–1979)
Lord William Bentinck	Cricket (one match)	MP for Camelford (1796), Nottinghamshire (1796–1803; 1812–1814; 1816–1826), King's Lynn (1826–1828), and Glasgow (1836–1839); Governor-General of India (1828–1835)
John Beresford, 5th Baron Decies	Polo (Olympic gold)	Irish representative peer of the House of Lords (Note: As Baron Decies)
J. G. B. Ponsonby	Cricket (first-class)	MP for Bletchingley (1831), Higham Ferrers (1831–1832), Derby (1835–1847); Member of the House of Lords (1847–1880) (Note: As Earl of Bessborough)
Christopher Bethell-Codrington	Cricket (first-class)	MP for Tewkesbury (1939–1951)
Malcolm Birks	Cricket (Cambridge University)	Candidate in the 2024 United Kingdom general election for Skipton and Ripon
Christopher Bland	Fencing (Olympic athlete)	Greater London Councillor for Lewisham
Lord Blandford	Cricket (first-class)	MP for Chippenham (1818–1820) and Woodstock (1826–1831; 1832–1835; 1838–1840); Member of the House of Lords (Note: As Duke of Marlborough)
Horace Blew	Association football (Wales national team)	Mayor of Wrexham (1923)
John Boland	Tennis (Olympic medalist)	MP for South Kerry (1900–1918)
Dennis Boles	Cricket (Minor Counties Championship)	MP for Wells (1797–1812)
Maurice Bonham-Carter	Cricket (Oxford University and Kent)	Principal Private Secretary to the Prime Minister (1910–1916)
Ronnie Boon	Rugby union (Wales international)	South Glamorgan County Councillor
Geoffrey Boot	Air sports (three-time King's Cup winner)	Member of the House of Keys for Glenfaba & Peel (2001–2018)
Granger Boston	Cricket (Cambridge University)	Candidate in the 1950 United Kingdom general election for West Gloucestershire; Candidate in the 1955 United Kingdom general election for Crewe
Ian Botham	Cricket (England captain)	Member of the House of Lords
Robert Bourne	Rowing (Olympic medalist)	MP for Oxford (1924–1938)
Patrick Bowes-Lyon	Tennis	Candidate in the 1885 United Kingdom general election at Barnard Castle
Sir William Bowyer-Smijth, 11th Baronet	Cricket (MCC)	MP for South Essex (1852–1857)
Dave Boylen	Association football (384 matches for Grimsby Town F.C.)	North East Lincolnshire Councillor (2007–2011)
Robert Bradford	Association football	MP for Belfast South (1974–1981)
H. R. Brand	Cricket (Sussex County Cricket Club)	MP for Hertfordshire (1868–1874) and Stroud (1874–1875; 1880–1886); Member of the House of Lords (Note: As Viscount Hampden)
Gyles Brandreth	Scrabble	MP for City of Chester (1992–1997)
Albert Brassey	Rowing	MP for Banbury (1895–1906)
William Brett	Rowing (The Boat Race)	MP for Helston (1866–1868); Member of the House of Lords (Note: As Baron and later Viscount Esher)
William Bridgeman	Cricket (first-class)	MP for Oswestry (1895–1906); Member of the House of Lords (Note: As Viscount Bridgeman)
William Bromley-Davenport	Association football	MP for Macclesfield (1886–1906); Financial Secretary to the War Office (1903–1905)
Warwick Brookes	Yachting	MP for Mile End (1916–1918)
Henry Brouncker, 3rd Viscount Brouncker	Chess	MP for New Romney (1665–1668)
Ralph Kilner Brown	Athletics (hurdling; British Empire Games medalist)	Candidate in the 1945 United Kingdom general election at Stourbridge
Robert Brudenell	Cricket (first-class)	MP for Marlborough (1797–1802); Member of the House of Lords (Note: As Earl of Cardigan)
Anthony Buller	Cricket (first-class)	MP for West Looe (1812–1816; 1831–1832)
James Redfoord Bulwer	Cricket (first-class)	MP for Ipswich (1874–1880) and Cambridgeshire (1881–1885)
Lord Burghley	Cricket (first-class)	MP for South Lincolnshire (1847–1857) and North Northamptonshire (1857–1867); Member of the House of Lords (Note: As Marquess of Exeter)
Tom Burlison	Association football	Treasurer of the Labour Party; Member of the House of Lords
Lindsay Bury	Association football (England national team); Cricket (first-class)	Bradfield councillor
Edward Buxton	Tennis (two-time Wimbledon player; two-time Woodford Parish Championship winner)	MP for Walthamstow (1885–1886)
Robert Byerley	Horse racing (breeder; Byerley Turk)	MP for County Durham (1865–1690) and Knaresborough (1695–1714)
Dan Byles	Rowing (Atlantic Rowing Race)	MP for North Warwickshire (2010–2015)
Allan Cameron	Curling (won the 1964 Swedish Cup)	Ross and Cromarty County Councillor
Frederick Campbell	Cricket (first-class)	London County Councillor for Norwood
Luke Campbell	Boxing (Olympic medalist)	Mayor of Hull and East Yorkshire (2025–)
Malcolm Campbell	Racing motorist	Candidate in the 1935 United Kingdom general election at Deptford
Menzies Campbell	Athletics (sprinting; Olympic athlete)	MP for North East Fife (1987–2015); Leader of the Liberal Democrats (2006–2007)
Sol Campbell	Association football	Candidate in the 2016 London mayoral election (not shortlisted)
George Cavendish-Bentinck	Cricket (first-class)	MP for Taunton (1859–1865) and Whitehaven (1865–1891)
Victor Cazalet	Squash (four-time champion)	MP for Chippenham (1924–1943)
Tankerville Chamberlayne	Cricket and yachting	MP for Southampton (1892–1895; 1900–1906)
Harry Walker Chambers	Association football (Wanderers F.C.)	Sheffield City Councillor
Arthur Charlton	Association football (Nottingham Forest F.C.)	Mayor of Brentford and Chiswick
Christopher Chataway	Athletics (sprinter)	MP for Lewisham North (1959–1966) and Chichester (1969–1974)
George Stanhope, 7th Earl of Chesterfield	Cricket (first-class)	MP for Nottinghamshire South (1860–1866); Member of the House of Lords (Note: As Earl of Chesterfield)
Joseph William Chitty	Cricket (first-class)	MP for Oxford (1880–1881)
William Clegg	Association football	Lord Mayor of Sheffield (1898); Sheffield City Councillor (1895–?)
Lewis Clive	Rowing (Olympic gold)	Kensington Metropolitan Borough Councillor for St. Charles
Sebastian Coe	Athletics (middle-distance; Olympic medalist)	MP for Falmouth and Camborne (1992–1997); Member of the House of Lords (2000–2022); Chief of Staff to the Leader of the Opposition (1997–2001)
Wenman Coke	Cricket (first-class)	MP for East Norfolk (1858–1865)
Henry Cole	Cricket	MP for Enniskillen (1844–1851) and Fermanagh (1854–1880)
Francis Compton	Cricket (first-class)	MP for South Hampshire (1880–1885) and New Forest (1885–1892)
Arthur Conan Doyle (Note: Better known as a fiction writer.)	Cricket (first-class)	Candidate in the 1900 United Kingdom general election at Edinburgh Central; Candidate in the 1906 United Kingdom general election at Hawick Burghs
Martin Conway	Mountaineering	MP for Combined English Universities (1918–1931); Member of the House of Lords (Note: As Baron Conway of Allington)
Lord Cope	Rugby union	MP for Llandaff and Barry (1918–1929); Member of the House of Lords (1945–1946)
William Courtenay	Cricket (first-class)	MP for Exeter (1812–1826); Member of the House of Lords (Note: As Earl of Devon)
John Coventry	Cricket (first-class)	Mayor of Worcester (1929; 1930); Candidate in the 1929 United Kingdom general election at Carmarthen
Lord Cowdrey of Tonbridge	Cricket (first-class)	Member of the House of Lords (1997–2000)
James Cracknell	Rowing	Candidate in the 2014 European Parliament election in the United Kingdom at South West England
Aidan Crawley	Cricket (first-class)	MP for Buckingham (1945–1951) and West Derbyshire (1962–1967)
Domini Crosfield	Tennis (Olympic non-starter; champion)	Candidate in the 1929 United Kingdom general election for Islington North
Anthony Crossley	Tennis (Wimbledon)	MP for Oldham (1931–1935) and Stretford (1935–1939)
Donald Crowhurst	Sailing (Sunday Times Golden Globe Race)	Bridgwater Borough Councillor
Foster Cunliffe	Cricket (first-class)	Candidate in the 1909 East Denbighshire by-election
Tom Curley	Association football (league football, Hamilton Academical F.C., Celtic F.C.)	Provost of North Lanarkshire
Herbert Mascall Curteis	Cricket (first-class)	MP for Rye (1847–1852)
Lord Dalkeith	Cricket (first-class)	MP for Marlborough (1793–1796; 1806–1807), Ludgershall (1796–1804), and Mitchell (1805–1806)
Daniel Dalton	Cricket (List A)	MEP for West Midlands
Lord Darnley	Cricket (test)	Member of the House of Lords (Irish representative peer) (1905–?)
Ewan Davies	Rugby union	Candidate in the 1924 United Kingdom general election at Cardiff South; Candidate in the 1929 United Kingdom general election at Llandaff and Barry
William Deedes	Cricket (first-class)	MP for East Kent (1845–1857; 1857–1862)
William Deedes	Cricket (first-class)	MP for East Kent (1876–1880)
Philip Dehany	Cricket (pioneer)	MP for St Ives (1778–1780)
George Denman	Rowing	MP for Tiverton (1859–1865; 1866–1872)
Lady Denton of Wakefield	Auto racing	Member of the House of Lords (1991–2001)
Lord Desborough	Fencing (Olympic medalist)	MP for Salisbury (1880–1882; 1885–1886), Hereford (1892–1893), and Wycombe (1900–1905); Member of the House of Lords (1905–1945)
Ted Dexter	Cricket (Test)	Candidate in the 1964 United Kingdom general election at Cardiff South East
Geoffrey Dickens	Boxing (heavyweight)	MP for Huddersfield West (1979–1983) and Littleborough and Saddleworth (1983–1995)
Eric Dolman	Cricket (first-class)	Lord Mayor of Cardiff (1967)
Jack Dormand	Association football and cricket	MP for Easington (1970–1987)
Charles Sackville, 2nd Duke of Dorset	Cricket	MP for East Grinstead (1734–1742; 1761–1765), Sussex (1742–1747), and Old Sarum (1747–1754); Member of the House of Lords (Note: As Duke of Dorset)
John Sackville, 3rd Duke of Dorset	Cricket	Member of the House of Lords
The Marquess of Douglas and Clydesdale	Boxing (Scottish amateur middleweight champion)	MP for East Renfrewshire (1930–1940); Member of the House of Lords (Note: As Duke of Hamilton)
Alec Douglas-Home	Cricket (first-class) (Note: As Lord Dunglass)	MP for Lanark (1931–1945; 1950–1951) and Kinross and Western Perthshire (1963–1974); Prime Minister of the United Kingdom (1963–1964); Member of the House of Lords (1951–1963; (Note: As Lord Home) 1974–1995 (Note: As Lord Home of the Hirsel))
Lord Douglas of Douglas	Cricket (Marylebone Cricket Club)	MP for Lanarkshire (1830–1832); Member of the House of Lords (Note: As Baron Douglas of Douglas)
Lord Drumlanrig	Cricket (first-class)	MP for Dumfriesshire (1847–1857); Member of the House of Lords (Note: As Marquess of Queensberry)
Charles Du Cane	Cricket (first-class)	MP for Maldon (1852–1854) and North Essex (1857–1868)
William Baring du Pré	Croquet (championship winner)	MP for Wycombe (1914–1923)
William Dudley Ward	Sailing (Olympic medalist)	MP for Southampton (1906–1922)
Sir John Eardley-Wilmot, 2nd Baronet	Cricket (first-class)	MP for South Warwickshire (1874–1885)
Peter Eckersley	Cricket (first-class)	MP for Manchester Exchange (1935–1940)
Tom Edwards-Moss	Rowing (The Boat Race)	MP for Widnes
George Elliot	Cricket (first-class)	MP for Chatham (1874–1875)
Walter Elliot	Rugby union	MP for Carshalton (1960–1974)
Lord Ernle	Cricket (first-class)	President of the Board of Agriculture (1916–1919)
Lestocq Robert Erskine	Tennis (Wimbledon)	Candidate in the 1906 United Kingdom general election at Horsham
David Evans	Association football	MP for Welwyn Hatfield (1987–1997)
Lindsay Everard	Cricket (first-class)	MP for Melton (1924–1945)
Lord Exeter	Athletics (hurdles and relay)	MP for Peterborough (1931–1943) (Note: As Lord Burghley); Governor of Bermuda (1943–1945)
Ian Fairbairn	Rowing (Olympic athlete)	Candidate in the 1924 United Kingdom general election at Burnley; Candidate in the 1929 United Kingdom general election at Burnley
Michael Falcon	Cricket (first-class)	MP for East Norfolk (1918–1923)
Percy Fender	Cricket (Test)	London County Councillor for Norwood
Eustace Fiennes	Tennis (1883 Swanage LTC Tournament singles winner; Cirencester Park Lawn Tennis Tournament competitor)	MP for Banbury (1906–1910; 1910–1918)
William Wentworth-Fitzwilliam, 6th Earl Fitzwilliam	Cricket (Sheffield Cricket Club)	MP for Malton (1837–1841; 1846–1847) and Wicklow (1847–1857); Member of the House of Lords (Note: As Earl Fitzwilliam)
John Floyer	Cricket (first-class)	MP for Dorset (1846–1857; 1864–1885)
Lord Forchester	Cricket (first-class)	MP for Wootton Bassett (1831–1832)
Henry Forster	Cricket (first-class)	MP for Sevenoaks (1892–1918) and Bromley (1918–1919); Member of the House of Lords (Note: As Baron Forster)
Clifford Forsythe	Association football	MP for South Antrim (1983–2000)
Francis Foster	Cricket (first-class)	Hampshire County Councillor (1889–?)
Henry Foster	Cricket (first-class)	Mayor of Cambridge
Walter Fowden	Swimming (world champion)	Hyde Borough Councillor for Werneth (1913–?); Mayor of Hyde (1922); Candidate in the 1918 United Kingdom general election at Stalybridge and Hyde
Hew Fraser	Field hockey (Olympic medalist)	Candidate in the 1929 United Kingdom general election at Wood Green; Candidate in the 1935 United Kingdom general election at Wood Green
Peter Freeman	Lawn tennis (Welsh Championship)	MP for Brecon and Radnorshire (1929–1931) and Newport (1945–1956)
John Fremantle	Rowing (Boat Race)	London County Councillor for Hampstead; Member of the House of Lords (Note: As Baron Cottesloe)
Thomas French	Cricket (first-class)	East Suffolk County Councillor
C. B. Fry	Association football Cricket (test)	Candidate in the 1922 United Kingdom general election at Brighton; Candidate in the 1923 United Kingdom general election at Banbury; Candidate in the 1924 Oxford by-election
William Fuller-Maitland	Cricket (first-class)	MP for Breconshire (1875–1895)
George Fuller	Cricket (first-class)	MP for Westbury (1885–1895)
Reginald Fulljames	Cricket (first-class)	Candidate in the 1945 United Kingdom general election at Southampton
John Carpenter Garnier	Cricket (first-class)	MP for South Devon (1873–1884)
Richard Garth	Cricket	MP for Guildford (1866–1868)
Fred Gibson	Cricket (first-class)	Barrow upon Soar Rural District Councillor for Mountsorrel
Thomas Milner Gibson	Sailing	MP for Ipswich (1837–1839), Manchester (1841–1857) and Ashton-under-Lyne (1857–1868)
William Kennedy Gibson	Association football (Ireland national team)	Belfast City Councillor
Ronald Gilbey	Figure skating	Westminster City Councillor (1945–1948); London County Councillor for Holborn and St Pancras South (1952–1958); St Pancras Borough Councillor (1959–1962); Greater London Councillor for Haringey (1967–1973); Candidate in the 1950 United Kingdom general election at Greenwich
William Henry Gladstone	Association football (Scotland international)	MP for Chester (1865–1868), Whitby (1868–1880), and East Worcestershire
Lord Glentoran	Bobsleigh	Member of the House of Lords (1995–2018 (Note: Since 1999, as elected hereditary peer))
Lord Gorrell	Cricket (first-class)	Under-Secretary of State for Air (1921–1922)
Donald Gorrie	Track and field (1957 Canadian Track and Field Championships)	MP for Edinburgh West (1997–2001); MSP for Central Scotland (1999–2007)
Lord Gower	Cricket (first-class)	MP for St Mawes (1808–1812), Newcastle-under-Lyme (1812–1815), and Staffordshire (1815–1820); Member of the House of Lords (Note: As Duke of Sutherland)
Lord James Graham	Cricket (first-class)	MP for Cambridge (1825–1832); Member of the House of Lords (Note: As Duke of Montrose)
Katherine Grainger	Rowing (Olympic and world champion)	Member of the House of Lords (2026–)
Henry Grayson	Cricket (first-class)	MP for Birkenhead (1918–1922)
George Greenwood	Cricket (first-class)	MP for Peterborough (1906–1918)
Lord Gretton	Sailing (Olympic medalist)	MP for Derbyshire South (1895–1906), Rutland (1907–1918), and Burton (1918–1943); Member of the House of Lords (1944–1947)
Lady Grey-Thompson	Athletics (Paralympic medalist)	Member of the House of Lords (2010–present)
Tommy de Grey	Cricket (first-class)	MP for West Norfolk (1865–1870); Member of the House of Lords (Note: As Baron Walsingham)
Edward Grimston	Cricket (first-class)	MP for St Albans (1835–1841)
Lord Grimston	Cricket (first-class)	MP for St Albans (1830–1831), Newport Iuxta Launceston (1831–1832), and Hertfordshire (1832–1845); Member of the House of Lords (Note: As Earl of Verulam)
Robert Grosvenor	Cricket (first-class)	MP for Westminster (1865–1874); Member of the House of Lords (Note: As Baron Ebury)
Lord Guernsey	Cricket (first-class)	MP for South Warwickshire (1849–1857)
Freddie Guest	Polo	Secretary of State for Air (1921–1922); MP for Plymouth Drake (1931–1937)
Rupert Guinness	Rowing	MP for Haggerston (1908–1910), South East Essex (1912–1918), Southend (1918–1927); Member of the House of Lords (Note: As Earl of Iveagh)
John Gully	Boxing	MP for Pontefract (1832–1837)
Peter Burrell, 1st Baron Gwydyr	Cricket (first-class)	MP for Haslemere (1776–1780) and Boston (1782–1796); Member of the House of Lords (Note: As Baron Gwydyr)
Henry St John Halford	Rifle shooting (tournament winner; considered "the father of rifle-shooting")	Leicestershire County Councillor
George Montagu-Dunk, 2nd Earl of Halifax	Cricket	Lord Lieutenant of Ireland (1761–1763); Member of the House of Lords
Gordon Halland	Cricket (first-class)	Lincolnshire County Councillor
Angus Hambro	Golf	MP for South Dorset (1910–1922) and North Dorset (1937–1945)
Alfred Hamersley	Rugby union	MP for Woodstock (1910–1918)
Lord George Hamilton	Cricket	MP for Middlesex (1868–1885) and Ealing (1885–1906); First Lord of the Admiralty (1885–1886; 1886–1892); Secretary of State for India (1895–1903)
Robert Hamilton	Association football (Great Britain Olympic team, Scottish men’s national team)	Provost of Elgin, Moray
Frederick Hankey	Cricket (first-class)	MP for Chertsey (1885–1892)
Henry Eric Southey Harben	Cricket (first-class)	Candidate in the 1945 United Kingdom general election at Watford
Frank Hardcastle	Cricket (first-class)	MP for Westhoughton (1885–1892)
Viscount Hardwicke	Cricket (first-class)	MP for Cambridgeshire (1865–1873); Member of the House of Lords (Note: As Earl of Hardwicke)
Lord Harris	Cricket (Test)	Under-Secretary of State for India (1885–?); Under-Secretary of State for War (1886–1890); Governor of Bombay (1890–1895)
Brian Harrison	Rowing (The Boat Race)	MP for Maldon (1955–1974)
William Harrison	Cricket (two matches for Staffordshire County Cricket Club)	Member of Staffordshire County Council
William Hart Dyke	Tennis (world champion)	MP for West Kent (1865–1868), Mid Kent (1868–1885), and Dartford (1885–1906)
Tom Hayhoe	Sailing (national and international competitor)	Candidate in the 1987 United Kingdom general election at Wycombe
Lord Hazlerigg	Cricket (first-class)	Candidate in the 1906 United Kingdom general election at Melton; Member of the House of Lords (1945–1949)
Arthur Heath	Cricket (first-class); Rugby union	MP for Hanley (1900–1906) and Leek (1910)
Edward Heath	Yachting (Admiral's Cup winning captain)	Prime Minister of the United Kingdom (1970–1974)
Sir James Heath, 1st Baronet	Cricket (first-class)	MP for North West Staffordshire (1892–1906)
Edward Hemmerde	Rowing	MP for East Denbighshire (1906–1910), North West Norfolk (1912–1918), and Crewe (1922–1924)
Arthur Henfrey	Association football (England national team); Cricket (first-class)	Northamptonshire County Councillor
John Heron-Maxwell	Cricket	MP for Kirkcudbrightshire (1880–1885)
Sir Frederick Hervey-Bathurst, 4th Baronet	Cricket (first-class)	MP for South Wiltshire (1861–1865)
Lady Heyhoe Flint	Cricket (WTest and WODI)	Member of the House of Lords (2010–2015)
Lord Higgins	Athletics (Commonwealth medalist)	MP for Worthing (1964–1997); Financial Secretary to the Treasury (1972–1974); Member of the House of Lords (1997–present)
Samuel Hill-Wood	Cricket (first-class)	MP for High Peak (1910–1929)
Lord Edwin Hill	Cricket	MP for Down (1845–1880); Member of the House of Lords (Note: As Baron Trevor)
Earl of Hillsborough	Cricket (Marylebone Cricket Club)	MP for County Down (1836–1845); Member of the House of Lords (Note: As Marquess of Downshire)
Alan Hinde	Cricket (first-class)	Melford Rural District Councillor
David Hodge	Association football (Greenock Morton F.C.)	Lord Provost of Glasgow (1977–1980)
Quintin Hogg	Association football (1876 FA Cup final; Scotland men's national team)	Alderman of London County Council
Lord Holmes of Richmond	Swimming (Paralympic medalist)	Member of the House of Lords (2013–present)
Henry Home-Drummond-Moray	Association football	MP for Perthshire (1878–1880)
Arthur Hope	Cricket (first-class)	MP for Nuneaton (1924–1929) and Birmingham Aston (1931–1939); Member of the House of Lords (Note: As Baron Rankeillour)
Sir James Horlick, 4th Baronet	Cricket (first-class)	MP for Gloucester (1923–1929)
Edward Hornby	Cricket (first-class)	MP for Blackburn (1869–1874)
Edward Horsman	Cricket (first-class)	MP for Cockermouth (1836–1852), Stroud (1853–1868), and Liskeard (1869–1876)
Henry Howard	Cricket (first-class)	MP for Steyning (1824–1826) and New Shoreham (1826–1832)
Lord Howe	Auto racing (24 Hours of Le Mans)	MP for Battersea South (1918–1929); Member of the House of Lords (1929–1964)
David Hughes-Morgan	Cricket	Mayor of Tenby (eight times)
Thomas Hughes	Cricket (first-class)	MP for Lambeth (1865–1868) and Frome (1868–1874)
Harrington Hulton	Cricket (Lancashire)	Candidate in the 1886 United Kingdom general election for Bosworth; Candidate in the 1892 United Kingdom general election for Bosworth
Henry Hunloke	Cricket	MP for West Derbyshire (1938–1944)
Francis Hurt	Cricket	MP for South Derbyshire (1837–1841)
Lord Hyde	Cricket (first-class)	MP for Brecon (1869–1870); Member of the House of Lords (Note: As Earl of Clarendon)
David Icke	Association football	Candidate in the 2008 Haltemprice and Howden by-election
Percy Illingworth	Rugby	MP for Shipley (1906–1915)
Davina Ingrams	Swimming and table tennis (Paralympic medalist)	Member of the House of Lords (1969–2008) (Note: As Baroness Darcy de Knayth)
Stanley Jackson	Cricket (Test)	MP for Howdenshire (1915–1926); Financial Secretary to the War Office (1922–1923); Governor of Bengal (1927–1932)
Arthur Frederick Jeffreys	Cricket	MP for Basingstoke (1887–1906); Parliamentary Secretary to the Local Government Board (1905)
Marc Jenkins	Triathlete (Olympic and Commonwealth athlete)	Candidate in the 2024 United Kingdom general election at Gower
William Jolliffe	Cricket (first-class)	MP for Petersfield (1830–1832; 1837–1838; 1841–1866); Member of the House of Lords (Note: As Baron Hylton)
James Robertson Justice (Note: Better known as an actor.)	Ice hockey	Candidate in the 1950 general election at North Angus and Mearns
William Kenyon-Slaney	Cricket (first-class) and association football	MP for Newport (1886–1908)
Michael Kilby	Cricket (minor counties)	Mayor of Dunstable (1963–1964); MEP for East of England (1984–1989)
Lord Kimberley	Polo	MP for Mid Norfolk (1906–1910); Member of the House of Lords (1932–1941)
Douglas Kinnaird	Cricket (first-class)	MP for Bishop's Castle (1819–1820)
Jack Kitching	Rugby league	Candidate in the 1950 United Kingdom general election at Bradford North
James Kitson	Cricket (first-class)	Mayor of Leeds (1860-1862)
Bruce Lamb	Cricket (first-class)	Andover Town Councillor
William Lascelles	Cricket (first-class)	MP for East Looe (1826–1830), Northallerton (1831–1832), Wakefield (1837–1841; 1842–1847), and Knaresborough (1847–1851)
Bonar Law	Chess	MP for Prime Minister of the United Kingdom (1922–1923)
Beilby Lawley	Cricket (I Zingari)	MP for Chester (1880); Member of the House of Lords (Note: As Baron Wenlock)
Joseph Leese	Cricket	MP for Accrington (1892–1910)
Jim Leishman	Association football (Dunfermline Athletic F.C. and Cowdenbeath F.C.)	Provost of Fife (2012–)
Charles Lennox	Cricket	MP for Sussex (1790–1806); Member of the House of Lords (Note: As Duke of Richmond)
Charles Powell Leslie	Cricket (first-class)	MP for Monaghan (1843–1871)
Sir John Leslie, 1st Baronet	Cricket	MP for Monaghan (1871–1880)
Lord Lewisham	Cricket (first-class)	MP for West Kent (1878–1885) and Lewisham (1885–1891); Member of the House of Lords (Note: As Earl of Dartmouth)
Morgan Lindsay	Association football (Royal Engineers A.F.C. at the 1878 FA Cup final)	Candidate in the 1900 United Kingdom general election at East Glamorganshire
George Lloyd	Rowing (The Boat Race)	MP for West Staffordshire (1910–1918) and Eastbourne (1924–1925); Member of the House of Lords (Note: As Baron Lloyd)
Richard Penruddocke Long	Cricket (first-class)	MP for Chippenham (1859–1865) and North Wiltshire (1865–1868)
Henry Longhurst	Golf	MP for Acton (1943–1945)
Robert Reid, 1st Earl Loreburn	Cricket (first-class)	MP for Hereford (1880–1885) and Dumfries Burghs (1886–1905); Member of the House of Lords (Note: As Earl Loreburn)
Henry Lowther	Cricket (first-class)	MP for Westmorland (1812–1867)
Laddie Lucas	Golf	MP for Brentford and Chiswick (1950–1959)
Stephen Lushington	Cricket (first-class)	MP for Great Yarmouth (1806–1808), Ilchester (1820–1826; 1831–1832), Tregony (1826–1830), Winchelsea (1831), and Tower Hamlets (1832–1841)
Philip Lybbe Powys Lybbe	Rowing (The Boat Race)	MP for Newport (1859–1865)
Leonard Lyle	Tennis (Wimbledon)	MP for Stratford West Ham (1918–1922), Epping (1923–1924), and Bournemouth (1940–1945); Member of the House of Lords (Note: As Baron Lyle of Westbourne)
Robert Lyne	Field hockey (Wales international)	Lord Mayor of Bristol (1951–1952)
Alfred Lyttelton	Cricket (Test)	MP for Warwick and Leamington (1895–1906) and Westminster St George's (1906–1913); Secretary of State for the Colonies (1903–1905)
Charles Lyttleton	Cricket (first-class)	MP for East Worcestershire (1868–1874); Member of the House of Lords (Note: As Baron Lyttleton and Viscount Cobham)
John Lyttelton	Cricket (first-class)	MP for Droitwich (1910–1916); Member of the House of Lords (Note: As Viscount Cobham)
Donald Macgregor	Marathon (Olympic athlete)	Fife Councillor
Lord Macnaghten	Rowing (The Boat Race)	MP for Antrim (1880–1885) and North Antrim (1885–1887); Lord of Appeal in Ordinary (Note: As Baron Macnaughten)
Angus MacNeil	Shinty	MP for Na h-Eileanan an Iar (2005–2024)
Ninian MacWhannell	Association football (1885 FA Cup Final)	Councillor
John Malcolm, 1st Baron Malcolm of Poltalloch	Association football	MP for Boston (1860–1878) and Argyllshire (1886–1892); Member of the House of Lords (Note: As Baron Malcolm of Poltalloch)
Seamus Mallon	Gaelic football	Deputy First Minister of Northern Ireland (1998–2001)
Sir Horatio Mann, 2nd Baronet	Cricket (first-class)	MP for Maidstone (1774–1784) and Sandwick (1790–1807)
John Manners-Sutton	Cricket (first-class)	MP for Cambridge (1839–1840; 1841–1847); Member of the House of Lords (Note: As Viscount Canterbury)
Robin Marlar	Cricket (first-class)	Candidate in the 1959 United Kingdom general election at Bolsover; Candidate in the 1962 Leicester North East by-election Candidate in the 1993 Newbury by-election
Hubert Martineau	Para-swimming and table tennis (first-class)	Candidate in the 1918 United Kingdom general election at Monmouth
Lady Masham of Ilton	Para-swimming and table tennis (Paralympic medalist)	Member of the House of Lords (1970–2023)
Maurice Matthews	Shooting (Olympic gold)	London County Councillor for St Pancras South West
Lord Maugham	Rowing	Lord High Chancellor of Great Britain (1938–1939); Member of the House of Lords (1939–1958)
Laura McAllister	Association football (Wales national women’s team)	Plaid Cymru parliamentary candidate (1987, 1992)
Thomas Stanislaus McAllister	Association football (Bohemian F.C.)	Senator (1929–1950)
Harry McCalmont	Yachting (Royal Yacht Squadron)	MP for Newmarket (1895–1902)
Reginald McKenna	Rowing	MP for North Monmouthshire (1895–1918)
Winston McKenzie	Boxing	Perennial candidate
Henry McLeish	Association football (semi-professional)	MP for Central Fife (1987–2001); Member of the Scottish Parliament for Central Fife (1999–2003); First Minister of Scotland (2000–2001)
R. J. McNeill	Cricket (first-class)	MP for St Augustine's (1911–1918) and Canterbury (1918–1927); Member of the House of Lords (Note: As Baron Cushenden)
Paul Methuen, 1st Baron Methuen	Cricket (first-class)	MP for Wiltshire (1812–1819) and North Wiltshire (1832–1837); Member of the House of Lords (Note: As Baron Methuen)
Hal Miller	Cricket (Free Foresters)	MP for Bromsgrove and Redditch (1974–1983) and Bromsgrove (1983–1992)
John Mills	Cricket (first-class)	MP for Rochester (1831–1835)
Robert Mitchell	Water polo (Olympic athlete)	Chair of the Greater London Council (1971–1972); Parliamentary candidate for West Ham South (1964, 1966)
Walter Monckton	Cricket (first-class)	MP for Bristol West (1951–1957); Member of the House of Lords (Note: As Viscount Monckton of Brenchley)
David John Morgan	Association football	MP for Walthamstow (1900–1906)
Ebenezer Cobb Morley	Rowing (Grand Challenge Cup)	Surrey County Councillor for Barnes (1903–1919)
James Morris	Cricket	MP for Halesowen and Rowley Regis (2010–2024)
Arthur Henry Aylmer Morton	Cricket	MP for Deptford (1897–1906)
Thomas Mostyn	Cricket	MP for Flintshire (1854–1861) (Note: As Thomas Lloyd-Mostyn)
Lord Moynihan	Rowing (Olympic medalist)	MP for Lewisham East (1983–1992); Member of the House of Lords (1997–present)
John Maclay	Rowing (The Boat Race)	MP for Montrose Burghs (1940–1950) and West Renfrewshire (1950–1964); Member of the House of Lords (Note: As Viscount Muirshiel)
Sir Henry Mulholland, 1st Baronet	Cricket	MP for Down (1921–1929) and Ards (1929–1945)
Patrick Munro	Rugby	MP for Llandaff and Barry (1931–1942)
Henry Munster	Cricket and rowing	MP for Mallow (1870)
Evan Nepean	Cricket	MP for Queenborough (1796–1802) and Bridport (1802–1812)
William Nicholson	Cricket (first-class)	MP for Petersfield (1866–1874; 1880–1885)
Philip Noel-Baker	Athletics (Olympic medalist)	MP for Coventry (1929–1931), Derby (1936–1950), and Derby South (1950–1970)
Denzil Onslow	Cricket (first-class)	MP for Guildford (1874–1885)
T. Onslow	Cricket (first-class)	MP for Rye (1775–1784) and Guildford (1784–1806); Member of the House of Lords (Note: As Earl of Onslow)
George Osbaldeston	Cricket (first-class)	MP for East Retford (1812–1818)
Arthur Page	Jeu de paume (Olympic athlete); Cricket (first class)	Candidate in the January 1910 United Kingdom general election for Derby
Almeric Paget	Sailing (regatta winner)	MP for Cambridge (1910–1917); Member of the House of Lords (Note: As Baron Queenborough)
Gerald Palmer	Cricket	MP for Winchester (1935–1945)
Edwin Patchitt	Cricket (first-class)	Mayor of Nottingham (1858)
William Pearce	Cricket (first-class)	London County Councillor for Limehouse (1892–1901); MP for Limehouse (1906–1922)
Charles Peat	Cricket (first-class)	MP for Darlington (1931–1945)
James Pender	Yachting	MP for Mid Northamptonshire (1895–1900)
John Philipps	Cricket (first-class)	MP for Haverfordwest (1847–1868) (Note: As John Scourfield)
James Pitman	Rugby union	MP for Bath (1945–1964)
Charles Ponsonby	Cricket	MP for Sevenoaks (1935–1950)
Thomas Colyear, 4th Earl of Portmore	Cricket (first-class)	MP for Boston (1796–1802); Member of the House of Lords (Note: As Earl of Portmore)
John Prescott	Boxing	MP for Kingston upon Hull East (1970–2010)
William Preston	Cricket	MP for Walsall (1924–1929)
Arthur Priestley	Cricket	MP for Grantham (1900–1918)
Dominic Raab	Karate (black belt, third Dan)	MP for Esher and Walton (2010–2024)
John Raphael	Rugby union and cricket (first-class)	Candidate in the 1909 Croydon by-election
John Rawlinson	Association football	MP for Cambridge University (1906–1926)
Tim Razzall	Cricket (first-class)	Member of the House of Lords (1997–) (Note: As Baron Razzall)
William Rees-Davies	Cricket	MP for Isle of Thanet (1953–1974) and Thanet West (1974–1983)
Peter Remnant	Cricket (first-class)	MP for Wokingham (1950–1959)
Edward Royd Rice	Cricket (first-class)	MP for Dover (1847–1857)
John Maunsell Richardson	Cricket (first-class)	MP for Brigg (1894–1895)
Philip Richardson	Shooting	MP for Chertsey (1922–1931)
Lord Richmond	Cricket	MP for Chichester (1722–1723) (Note: As Charles Lennox); Member of the House of Lords
Lord March	Cricket	MP for West Sussex (1841–1860); President of the Board of Trade (1867–1868; 1885); Lord President of the Council (1874–1880); Secretary for Scotland (1885-1886); Member of the House of Lords
Clyde Rimple	Cycling (Olympic athlete for the British West Indies)	Bracknell councillor
Robert Collier	Cricket (first-class)	Member of the House of Lords; Under-Secretary of State for War (1895); Chairman of the London County Council (1903–1904)
Lord Rochdale	Cricket (first-class)	MP for Heywood (1895–1906) and Manchester North West (1910–1912); Member of the House of Lords (1913–1945)
Edward Romilly	Cricket (first-class)	MP for Ludlow (1832–1835)
Frederick Romilly	Cricket (first-class)	MP for Canterbury (1850–1852)
Lord Ronaldshay	Tennis and auto racing	Would-be-candidate for a later-cancelled United Kingdom general election that was to take place in 1939 or 1940; Member of the House of Lords (Note: As Marquess of Zetland)
Lord Rosebery	Cricket (first-class)	MP for Midlothian (1906–1910); Member of the House of Lords (1929–1974)
Horatio Ross	Shooting	MP for Aberdeen Burghs (1831–1832) and Montrose Burghs (1832–1835)
Don Rossiter	Association football	Medway District Councillor; Mayor of Rochester, Kent (1985–1986)
James Round	Cricket (first-class)	MP for East Essex (1868–1885) and Harwich (1885–1906)
Charles Savile Roundell	Cricket (first-class)	MP for Grantham (1880–1885) and Skipton (1892–1895)
Henry John Rous	Horse racing (Jockey Club steward)	MP for Westminster (1841–1846)
Percy Royds	Rugby union	MP for Kingston-upon-Thames (1937–1945)
Charles Russell	Cricket (first-class)	MP for Bedfordshire (1832–1841; 1847)
Oliver Russell, 2nd Baron Ampthill	Rowing (The Boat Race)	Member of the House of Lords (1884–1935) (Note: As Baron Ampthill); Governor of Madras (1900–1906)
Samuel Ryder	Golf (amateur who later sponsored the Ryder Cup)	Mayor of St Albans (1905)
Walter Rye	Cross country running (1868 AAC Championships 7 mile winner)	Mayor of Norwich (1908–1909)
Lord John Sackville	Cricket	MP for Tamworth (1734–1747)
Molly Samuel	Karate (world champion)	Candidate in the 2015 United Kingdom general election at Walthamstow; Candidate in the 2017 United Kingdom general election at Walthamstow; Candidate in the 2021 London Assembly election at Brent and Harrow
Lancelot Sanderson	Cricket (first-class)	MP for Appleby (1910–1915)
Roz Savage	Ocean rowing	MP for South Cotswolds (2024–)
Lord Seaham	Cricket	MP for North Durham (1847–1854); Member of the House of Lords (Note: As Marquess of Londonderry)
John Edmund Severne	Rowing	MP for Ludlow (1865–1868) and South Shropshire (1876–1885)
Rosi Sexton	Mixed martial arts (Cage Warriors and Ultimate Fighting Championship)	Solihull Metropolitan Borough Councillor for Shirley West (2019–?); Candidate in the 2019 United Kingdom general election for Solihull
Michael Shaw-Stewart	Cricket (first-class)	MP for Renfrewshire (1855–1865)
Graham Shaw	Association football (284 league matches)	Newcastle-under-Lyme Borough Councillor for Knutton (2026–present)
Henry Holroyd, 3rd Earl of Sheffield	Cricket	MP for East Sussex (1857–1865); Member of the House of Lords (Note: As Earl of Sheffield)
Sir John Shelley, 6th Baronet	Cricket (first-class)	MP for Helston (1806) and Lewes (1816–1831)
Tommy Sheridan	Association football	MSP for Glasgow (1999–2007)
Samuel Silkin	Cricket (first-class)	MP for Dulwich (1964–1983); Member of the House of Lords (Note: As Baron Silkin of Dulwich)
Ronnie Simpson	Association football (Scottish men’s national team)	Edinburgh City Councillor (1970s)
Arthur Smith-Barry	Cricket (first-class)	MP for County Cork (1865–1874) and Huntingdon (1886–1900); Member of the House of Lords
Eric Smith	Golf (championship)	MP for Grantham (1950–1951)
Liz Smith	Cricket	MSP for Mid Scotland and Fife (2007–2026)
Thomas Assheton Smith	Cricket (first-class)	MP for Caernarvonshire (1774–1780)
Thomas Assheton Smith	Cricket	MP for Andover (1821–1831) and Caernarvonshire (1832–1837)
Sir John Smyth, 1st Baronet	Cricket (first-class)	MP for Norwood (1950–1966)
Percy Spark	Decathlon (Olympic athlete)	Lord Mayor of Stoke-on-Trent (1949–1950)
Edward Stanhope	Cricket	MP for Mid Lincolnshire (1874–1885) and Horncastle (1885–1893)
Arthur Stanley	Ice hockey (Rideau Hall Rebels)	MP for Ormskirk (1898–1918)
Alexander Stevenson	Bowls (Scotland international)	Lord Provost of Edinburgh (1926–1929)
Alan Plantagenet Stewart	Cricket (first-class)	MP for Wigtownshire (1868–1873); Member of the House of Lords (Note: As Earl of Galloway)
Patrick Stirling	Association football (Doncaster Rovers F.C.)	Mayor of Doncaster (1914)
Alex Story	Rowing (Olympic athlete)	Candidate in the 2014 European Parliament election in the United Kingdom at Yorkshire and the Humber
Henry Strutt	Cricket (MCC)	MP for East Derbyshire (1868–1874) and Berwick-upon-Tweed (1880)
Kynaston Studd	Cricket (first-class)	Lord Mayor of London (1928–1929)
Peter Malden Studd	Cricket (first-class)	Lord Mayor of London (1970–1971)
William Harbord, 2nd Baron Suffield	Cricket (first-class)	MP for Ludgershall (1790–1796) and Plympton Erle (1807–1810); Member of the House of Lords (Note: As Baron Suffield)
Christopher Sutton-Mattocks	Cricket (Oxford University and Surrey County Cricket Club)	Candidate in the 1987 United Kingdom general election for Maidstone
Matthew Syed	Table tennis (Commonwealth Games gold medalist)	Candidate in the 2001 United Kingdom general election for Wokingham
Thomas Tapling	Cricket (first-class)	MP for Harborough (1886–1891)
Richard Grenville-Temple, 2nd Earl Temple	Cricket	MP for Buckingham (1734–1741; 1747–1752) and Buckinghamshire (1741–1747); Member of the House of Lords (Note: As Earl Temple)
Henry Tufton, 11th Earl of Thanet	Cricket	MP for Rochester (1796–1802) and Appleby (1826–1832); Member of the House of Lords (Note: As Earl of Thanet)
Clem Thomas	Rugby union (international)	Candidate in the 1974 February United Kingdom general election at Gower; Candidate in the 1979 United Kingdom general election at Carmarthen; Candidate in the 1979 European Parliament election at Mid and West Wales
Eddie Thomas	Boxing (1949 British welterweight champion and 1951 European welterweight title)	Mayor of Merthyr Tydfil (1994)
Sir Douglas Thomson, 2nd Baronet	Rowing (The Boat Race)	MP for Aberdeen South (1935–1946)
Percy Thornton	Cricket	MP for Clapham (1892–1910)
Cyril Tolley	Golf	Candidate in the 1950 United Kingdom general election at Hendon South
Michael Tomlinson	Cricket (Minor Counties)	MP for Mid Dorset and North Poole (2015–2024)
Stuart Townend	Athletics	Paddington Borough Councillor (10 years, years unknown); London County Councillor for Chelsea (1958–1965); Candidate in the 1950 United Kingdom general election at Torquay; Candidate in the 1951 United Kingdom general election at Falmouth and Camborne
Alfred Trestrail	Cricket (first-class)	Candidate in the December 1910 United Kingdom general election at Tiverton; Candidate in the 1918 United Kingdom general election at Tiverton
Neville Tufnell	Cricket (Test)	Candidate in the 1945 United Kingdom general election at Windsor
John Tufton	Cricket (first-class)	MP for Appleby (1796–1799)
Robert Uniacke-Penrose-Fitzgerald	Rowing (The Boat Race)	MP for Cambridge (1885–1906)
Arthur Upton	Cricket	MP for Bury St Edmunds (1818–1826)
Solomon Upton	Association football (Tottenham Hotspur F.C.)	Mayor of Higham Ferrers (1949)
Richard Vernon	Horse racing (Jockey Club)	MP for Tavistock (1754–1761), Bedford (1761–1774), Okehampton (1774–1784), and Newcastle-under-Lyme (1784–1790)
Hugh Vincent	Rugby union (Wales international)	Mayor of Bangor
Lord Wakefield of Kendal	Rugby union	MP for Swindon (1935–1945) and St Marylebone (1945–1963)
Frank Walkinshaw	Cricket (first-class)	Hartley Wintney Rural District Councillor
W. H. Walrond	Cricket	MP for East Devon (1880–1885) and Tiverton (1885–1906); Member of the House of Lords (Note: As Baron Walrond)
James Leslie Wanklyn	Cricket	MP for Bradford Central (1895–1906)
Arnold Ward	Cricket	MP for Watford (1910–1918)
W. Ward	Cricket	MP for City of London (1826–1831)
Simon Warley	Cricket (first-class)	Canterbury City Councillor
Charles Warren	Cricket (Middlesex)	MP for Dorchester (1819–1826)
James Watney Jr	Cricket (first-class)	MP for East Surrey (1871–1885)
Billy Watson	Association football (England national team; 340 appearances for Burnley F.C.)	Southport councillor
Brian Whittle	Athletics (Commonwealth medalist)	Member of the Scottish Parliament for South Scotland (2016–2026)
William Whitwell	Cricket (first-class)	North Riding County Councillor
Herbert Wilberforce	Tennis	Candidate in the 1900 United Kingdom general election at Hackney North; London County Councillor for St Pancras North (1901–1904)
Frank Willan	Rowing (Boat Race)	Alderman of Hampshire County Council
Lord Williams of Elvel	Cricket (first-class)	Member of the House of Lords (1985–2019)
Freeman Freeman-Thomas, 1st Marquess of Willingdon	Cricket (Cambridge University)	MP for Hastings (1900–1906) and Bodmin (1906–1910); Governor General of Canada (1926–1931); Member of the House of Lords (Note: As Marquess of Willingdon and previous titles)
Roy Wilson	Cricket (Minor Counties Championship)	MP for Lichfield (1924–1929)
William McConnell Wilton	Association football	Member of the Senate of Northern Ireland (1945–1953)
Ivor Guest, 1st Viscount Wimborne	Polo	MP for Plymouth (1900–1906) and Cardiff (1906–1910); Member of the House of Lords (Note: As Viscount Wimborne)
Ernest Woodhead	Rugby union	Mayor of Huddersfield, Yorkshire (?-?); Candidate in the 1918 United Kingdom general election at Huddersfield; Candidate in the 1923 United Kingdom general election at Sheffield Hillsborough; Candidate in the 1924 United Kingdom general election at Pudsey and Otley
David Wrench	Rugby union (Harlequin F.C. and English national team)	Somerset County Councillor
Henry Wright	Cricket (first-class)	MP for Leominster (1912–1918)
Henry Smith Wright	Rowing	MP for Nottingham South (1886–1895)
Derek Wyatt	Rugby union	MP for Sittingbourne and Sheppey (1997–2010)
Charles Wynne	Cricket	MP for Caernarfon (1859–1865)
Marmaduke Wyvill	Chess	MP for Richmond (1847–1865; 1866–1868)
Lord Yarmouth	Cricket (first-class)	MP for Orford (1797–1802), Lisburn (1802–1812), Antrim (1812–1818), and Camelford (1820–1822); Member of the House of Lords (Note: As Marquess of Hertford)
John Young	Cricket (first-class)	Eastbourne Town Councillor for Hampden Park Ward

== North America ==
=== Anguilla ===
Name	Sport	Position
Dee-Ann Kentish-Rogers	Athletics (Commonwealth Games athlete)	MHA for Valley South (2020–2025); Minister for Education and Social Development (2020–2025)

=== Antigua and Barbuda ===
Name	Sport	Position
Lester Bird	Cricket (1959 Pan American Games medalist)	Prime Minister (1994–2004)

=== Bahamas ===
Name	Sport	Position
Bradley Cooper	Athletics (Olympic athlete)	MP
Leonardo Lightbourne	Basketball	MP
Shonel Ferguson		
Iram Lewis		
Bernard Nottage	Sprinting (Olympics)	MP (1987-?; 2012–2017)
Robert Symonette	Sailing (Olympics)	MP; Speaker of the House of Assembly of the Bahamas (1962–1967)
Renward Wells		

=== Barbados ===
Name	Sport	Position
Grantley Herbert Adams	Cricket (first-class)	Prime Minister of the West Indies Federation (1958–1962); Premier of Barbados (1953–1958)
Harold Austin		
G. Aubrey Goodman		
Wes Hall		

=== Bermuda ===
Name	Sport	Position
Reginald Conyers		
Randy Horton		
Kim Swan		

=== Canada ===
Name	Sport	Position
Keith Acton	Ice hockey (NHL)	Candidate in the 2018 York Region municipal elections at Whitchurch-Stouffville
Al Adair	Baseball (North Peace Baseball League)	Alberta MLA for Peace River (1971–1993)
Roger Allen	Cross-country skiing	Northwest Territories MLA for Inuvik Twin Lakes (1999–2004)
A. Thomas Alsbury	Soccer (Pacific Coast Soccer League)	Mayor of Vancouver (1959–1962)
David Anderson	Rowing (Olympic medalist)	MP for Esquimalt—Saanich (1968–1972) and Victoria (1993–2006); British Columbia MLA for Victoria
Sandy Annunziata	Canadian football (CFL)	Niagara Regional Councillor (2014–2018)
Syl Apps	Ice hockey (NHL)	Ontario MPP for Kingston (1963–1967) and Kingston and the Islands (1967–1975)
Roland Armitage	Horse racing (racer)	Mayor of West Carleton (1991–1994)
Uzoma Asagwara	Basketball (2007 Pan American Games)	Manitoba MLA for Union Station (2019–); Deputy Premier of Manitoba (2023–)
Don Atchison	Ice hockey (Western Hockey League)	Mayor of Saskatoon (2003–2016)
Ewart C. Atkinson	Ice hockey (coached the UNB Reds men's team)	New Brunswick MLA for Sunbury (1925–1935)
Bob Attersley	Ice hockey (Olympic medalist)	Mayor of Whitby, Ontario (1981–1992)
Clem Aubin	Ice hockey (Ottawa City Hockey League)	Alderman on Ottawa City Council (1947–1962)
Susan Auch	Speed skating (Olympic medalist)	Candidate in the 2011 Manitoba general election at Assiniboia; Candidate in the 2025 Transcona provincial by-election
Emery Barnes	Canadian football	British Columbia MLA for Vancouver-Burrard (1991–1996) and Vancouver Centre (1972–1991)
Betty Baxter	Volleyball (Olympic athlete)	Candidate in the 1993 Canadian federal election at Vancouver Centre
Roland Beaudry	Ice hockey (Montreal Victorias)	MP for St. James (1945–1953) and Saint-Jacques (1953–1958)
Jonathan Beaulieu-Richard	Canadian football (CFL)	Candidate in the 2018 Quebec general election at Maskinongé
Dick Beddoes	Curling	Etobicoke Borough Councillor (1969–?)
Reginald Bell	Curling (Prince Edward Island at the 1940 and 1942 Macdonald Briers)	Prince Edward Island MLA for 2nd Queens (1944–1960)
Lyne Bessette	Cycling (Olympic athlete)	MP for Brome—Missisquoi (2019–2021)
Dan Biocchi	Athletics (Olympic athlete)	Candidate in the 2004 Canadian federal election at Ottawa—Orléans; Candidate in the 2006 Ottawa municipal election at Cumberland Ward
Marilyn Bodogh	Curling	Candidate in the 2006 St. Catharines municipal election
John Borger	Canadian football (Calgary Stampeders)	Candidate in the 1974 Alberta Liberal Party leadership election
Denis Boucher	Baseball (MLB)	Candidate in the 2021 Montreal municipal election at Lachine
Pierre Bourque	Auto racing (NASCAR)	Ottawa City Councillor at By-Rideau Ward (1991); Candidate in the 1993 Canadian federal election at Rosemont
James Langstaff Bowman	Curling (Olympic gold medalist)	MP for Dauphin (1930–1935); Speaker of the House of Commons (1935–1936)
John Bracken	Curling	Premier of Manitoba (1922–1943)
Luc Brodeur-Jourdain	Canadian football (127 games for the Montreal Alouettes)	Candidate in the pending Saint-Hyacinthe—Bagot—Acton federal by-election
Albert A. Brown	Canadian football	MP for Hamilton East (1935–1940)
Allan Percy Brown	Boxing (national welterweight champion)	Saskatchewan MLA for Melville (1952–1956)
Norman Buchanan	Baseball (New Brunswick Senior Baseball League)	New Brunswick MLA for Charlotte County (1952–1960)
Bev Buckway	Curling	Mayor of Whitehorse, Yukon (2006–2012)
William Herbert Burns	Curling (Olympic gold medalist)	MP for Portage la Prairie (1930–1935)
Chrissy Cadorin	Curling (2017 Curling Ontario Trophy Championship)	Candidate in the 2026 York Region municipal elections at Markham City Council Ward 1c
David Calder	Rowing (Olympic medalist)	Candidate in the 2017 British Columbia general election at Saanich South
Thane Campbell	Curling	Premier of Prince Edward Island (1936–1943)
Colin Campbell	Curling (Macdonald Brier)	MP for Frontenac—Addington (1934–1937); Ontario MPP for Sault Ste. Marie (1937–1943)
Herb Capozzi	Canadian football (CFL)	British Columbia MLA at Vancouver Centre (1966–1972)
Gary Carr	Ice hockey (Ontario Hockey League)	Ontario MPP for Oakville South (1990–1999) and Oakville (1999–2003); MP for Halton (2004–2006)
Donald Carrick	Boxing (Olympic athlete)	MP for Trinity (1954–1957)
Terry Cavanagh	Ice hockey (Quebec Senior Hockey League and Western International Hockey League)	Mayor of Edmonton (1975–1977; 1988–1989)
Steve Charbonneau	Canadian football (CFL)	Candidate in the 2025 Canadian federal election at Brome—Missisquoi
Isabelle Charest	Short-track speed skating	Quebec MNA for Brome-Missisquoi (2018–2026)
Enrico Ciccone	Ice hockey (NHL)	Quebec MNA for Marquette (2018–)
Chub Collins	Baseball (MLB)	Mayor of Dundas, Ontario (1901–1902); Reeve of Barton Township, Ontario
Lionel Conacher	Canadian football and ice hockey (Grey Cup and Stanley Cup champions)	Ontario MPP for Bracondale (1937–1943); MP for Trinity (1949–1954)
Joseph E. Connolly	Curling (played in The Brier for New Brunswick)	New Brunswick MLA for Gloucester (1940–1960)
Tim Cranston	Ice hockey (professional games; Great British men's national team)	Candidate in the 2021 Nova Scotia general election at Halifax Atlantic
Jimmy Creighton	Ice hockey (NHL)	Mayor of Brandon, Manitoba (1952–1955; 1958–1961)
Bill Crothers	Athletics (Olympic medalist)	Trustee of the York Region District School Board
Troy Crowder	Ice hockey (NHL)	Candidate in the 2018 Ontario general election at Sudbury; Candidate in the 2018 Greater Sudbury municipal election
Malachy Bowes Daly	Cricket	MP for Halifax (1878–1887); Lieutenant Governor of Nova Scotia (1890–1900)
Jason Day	Mixed martial arts (UFC)	Withdrawn candidate in the 2024 British Columbia general election at Columbia River-Revelstoke
Buddy Daye	Boxing	Candidate in the 1967 Nova Scotia general election at Halifax Needham
Paul Delorey	Curling	Northwest Territories MLA for Hay River North (1999–2011)
Jacques Demers	Ice hockey (coach)	Senator from Rigaud (2009–2019)
Terry Dennis	Curling	Saskatchewan MLA for Canora-Pelly (2016–2024)
Laurent Desjardins	Canadian football (Winnipeg Blue Bombers)	Manitoba MLA for St. Boniface (1959–1973; 1974–1988)
Mabel DeWare	Curling	New Brunswick MLA for Moncton West (1978–1987); Senator at New Brunswick (1990–2001)
Marco Di Girolamo	Rugby union (Canada men's national team)	Candidate in the 2022 York Region municipal elections for Aurora Town Council
Marie-Eve Dicaire	Boxing (IBF female super-welterweight world champion)	Terrebonne City Councillor
Nathan Divinsky	Chess	Vancouver City Councillor (1981–1982)
Jerry Dobrovolny	Canadian football (CFL)	New Westminster City Councillor (1996–2005)
Fin Donnelly	Swimming (marathon)	MP for New Westminster—Coquitlam (2009–2015) and Port Moody—Coquitlam (2015–2019)
Clive Doucet	Canadian football (Carleton Ravens)	Ottawa City Councillor (2001–2010)
Nancy Drolet	Ice hockey (Olympic medalist)	Candidate in the 2021 Canadian federal election at Rosemont—La Petite-Patrie
Ken Dryden	Ice hockey (NHL)	MP for York Centre (2004–2011)
Dick Duff	Ice hockey (NHL)	Candidate in the 1972 Canadian federal election at Timiskaming
Guylaine Dumont	Beach volleyball (Olympic athlete)	Candidate in the 2021 Canadian federal election at Lévis—Lotbinière
Evan Dunfee	Race walking (Olympic athlete)	Candidate in the 2022 British Columbia municipal elections for Richmond City Council
Peter Dyakowski	Canadian football (CFL)	Candidate in the 2019 Canadian federal election at Hamilton Mountain
Maxime Elmaleh	Curling (2006 Tim Hortons Brier champion)	Quebec City Councillor (2025–)
Angelo Esposito	Ice hockey (Motor České Budějovice)	Candidate in the 2019 Canadian federal election at Alfred-Pellan
Wayne Ewasko	Curling	Manitoba MLA for Lac du Bonnet (2011–)
Lee Fairclough	Rugby union (women's national team)	Ontario MPP for Etobicoke—Lakeshore (2025–)
Sylvia Fedoruk	Curling	Lieutenant Governor of Saskatchewan (1988–1994)
Dan Ferrone	Canadian football (CFL)	Candidate in the 2000 Canadian federal election at Oakville
Pat Fiacco	Boxing (national bantamweight champion)	Mayor of Regina, Saskatchewan (2000–2012)
Maria Fitzpatrick	Athletics	Alberta MLA for Lethbridge-East (2015–2019)
Larry Fleisher	Canadian football (Hamilton Tigers and Hamilton Wildcats)	Hamilton City Councillor
Rick Folk	Curling (world champion)	Saskatchewan MLA for Saskatoon University (1982–1986)
Peter Fonseca	Athletics (marathon)	Ontario MPP for Mississauga East (2003–2007) and Mississauga East—Cooksville (2007–2011); MP for Mississauga East—Cooksville (2015–)
Robert Forhan	Ice hockey (Olympic medalist)	Mayor of Newmarket, Ontario (1971–1978); Regional Municipality of York Chair (1978–1984)
Len Fox	Ice hockey (Vanderhoof Bears)	British Columbia MLA for Prince George-Omineca (1991–1996)
Sylvie Fréchette	Synchronised swimming (Olympic gold medalist)	Candidate in the 2019 Canadian federal election at Rivière-du-Nord
Philippe Gagnon	Swimming (Paralympic medalist)	Candidate in the 2019 Canadian federal election at Jonquière
Arthur D. Ganong	Curling	MP for Charlotte (1930–1935)
Hardy N. Ganong	Curling	St. Stephen Town Councillor (?-?); Federal candidate at New Brunswick Southwest (1949 and 1953)
Garde Gardom	Basketball (UBC Thunderbirds)	Lieutenant Governor of British Columbia (1995–2001); British Columbia MLA at Vancouver-Point Grey (1966–1986)
Don Getty	Canadian football (Grey Cup)	Premier of Alberta (1985–1992); Alberta MLA for Strathcona West (1967–1971), Edmonton-Whitemud (1971–1979; 1985–1989), and Stettler (1989–1992)
Scott Gillingham	Ice hockey (Manitoba Junior Hockey League)	Mayor of Winnipeg (2022–)
E. A. Gilroy	Ice hockey (coach in the Manitoba Professional Hockey League)	Alderman in Portage la Prairie; Candidate in the 1933 Portage la Prairie provincial by-election
Paul Goodman	Ice hockey (52 Chicago Black Hawks games)	Winnipeg City Councillor (1954–1959); Candidate in the 1958 Manitoba general election at Winnipeg Centre
Jean-François Gosselin	Ice hockey (Shreveport Mudbugs)	Quebec MNA for Jean-Lesage (2007–2008)
Wells Gray	Lacrosse (New Westminster Salmonbellies world champions)	Mayor of New Westminster (1913–1919; 1927–1933); British Columbia MLA for New Westminster (1927–1944)
Nancy Greene Raine	Alpine skiing (Olympic medalist)	Senator at British Columbia (2009–2018)
Jason Groleau	Ice hockey (QMJHL)	MP for Beauce (2025–)
Marwan Hage	Canadian football (CFL)	Candidate in the 2019 Canadian federal election at Hamilton East—Stoney Creek; not nominated
Alfred Hales	Canadian football (Toronto Argonauts)	MP for Wellington (1957–1968) and Wellington South (1968–1974)
Jack Hamilton	Ice hockey (coached the Regina Victorias)	Mayor of Sutherland, Saskatchewan (1916–?)
Howard Hampton	Ice hockey (NCAA Division I)	Ontario MPP for Rainy River District (1987–1999) and Kenora—Rainy River (1999–2011)
Ned Hanlan	Rowing	Alderman at Toronto
Fred Haynes	Aikido (instructor)	Mayor of Saanich, British Columbia (2018–2022)
George Hees	Boxing; Canadian football (Grey Cup 1938)	MP for Broadview (1950–1963), Northumberland (1965–1968; 1979–1988), and Prince Edward—Hastings (1968–1979)
Kent Hehr	Ice hockey (Alberta Junior Hockey League)	Alberta MLA for Calgary-Buffalo (2008–2015); MP for Calgary Centre (2015–2019)
Mickey Hennessy	Boxing (national champion)	Ontario MPP for Fort William (1977–1987)
John Gilbert Higgins	Ice hockey (Oxford-Canadian)	Senator at St. John's East (1959–1963)
Frederick Hoblitzell	Golf (Ontario amateur champion)	MP for Eglinton (1940–1945)
Balarama Holness	Canadian football (CFL)	Candidate in the 2017 Montreal municipal election
Anthony Housefather	Swimming (Maccabiah Games medalist)	MP for Mount Royal (2015-)
Ted Hsu	Chess (Class A)	MP for Kingston and the Islands (2011–2015)
Rod Hunter	Curling (world champion)	Viking, Alberta Town Councillor
C. S. Hyman	Tennis	MP for London (1891–1892; 1900–1907)
Bert Iannone	Canadian football (Grey Cup)	Candidate in the 1953 Canadian federal election at Regina
Daniel Igali	Wrestling (Olympic medalist)	Candidate in the 2005 British Columbia general election at Surrey-Newton
Mike Jakubo	Curling (Brier)	Greater Sudbury City Councillor at Ward 7
Otto Jelinek	Figure skating (Olympic athlete)	MP for High Park—Humber Valley (1972–1979), Halton (1979–1988), and Oakville—Milton (1988–1993)
Ferguson Jenkins	Baseball (MLB)	Candidate in the 1985 Ontario general election at Windsor—Riverside
Boss Johnson	Lacrosse (Vancouver Lacrosse Club)	Premier of British Columbia (1947–1952)
Ray Johnson	Canadian football (Edmonton Eskimos)	Candidate in the 1993 Canadian federal election at Hamilton—Wentworth
Sam Johnston	Archery (North American Indigenous Games)	Yukon MLA for Campbell (1985–1992)
Sam Johnston	Taekwondo (gold medalist at the World Taekwondo Hanmadang)	New Brunswick MLA for Miramichi Bay-Neguac (2024–)
Greg Joy	Athletics (Olympic medalist)	Candidate in the 1995 Ontario general election at Ottawa West
Ravi Kahlon	Field hockey (Olympic athlete)	British Columbia MLA for Delta North (2017–)
Hugh Llewellyn Keenleyside	Soccer (coached the Penn State Nittany Lions men's team); Ice hockey (coached the Syracuse Orangemen)	Commissioner of the Northwest Territories (1947–1950)
Morley Kells	Lacrosse (Minto Cup)	Ontario MPP for Humber (1981–1985) and Etobicoke—Lakeshore (1995–2003)
Red Kelly	Ice hockey (NHL)	MP for York West (1962–1965)
Trevor Kennerd	Canadian football (Grey Cup)	Candidate in the 2008 Canadian federal election at Winnipeg South Centre
Obby Khan	Canadian football (CFL)	Manitoba MLA for Fort Whyte (2022–)
Chris Kibermanis	Ice hockey (Western Hockey League)	Candidate in the 2004 Alberta general election at Edmonton-Castle Downs; Candidate in the 2008 Alberta general election
Bruce Kidd	Track and field (Commonwealth athlete)	Candidate in the 1971 Ontario general election at Beaches—Woodbine
Bob Kilger	Ice hockey (played in the minor leagues)	MP for Stormont—Dundas (1988–2000) and Stormont—Dundas—Charlottenburgh (2000–2004); Mayor of Cornwall, Ontario (2006–2014)
Anna Kindy	Skiing (Olympic athlete)	British Columbia MLA for North Island (2024–)
Ray Kingsmith	Curling	Candidate in the 1971 Alberta general election
John Nesbitt Kirchhoffer	Cricket	Senator at Selkirk, Manitoba (1892–1914); Manitoba MLA for Brandon West (1886–1888)
Kiviaq	Boxing (prizefighter); Canadian football (CFL, never played a game)	Edmonton City Councillor (1968–1974)
Fred Koe	Curling	Northwest Territories MLA for Inuvik (1991–1995)
Helena Konanz	Tennis (Wimbledon) (Note: As Helena Manset)	Penticton City Councillor (2011–2019); Candidate in the 2019 Canadian federal election at South Okanagan—West Kootenay
Jamie Korab	Curling	St. John's City Councillor at Ward 3 (2017–2024)
Oscar Kruger	Canadian football (CFL)	Candidate in the 1967 Alberta general election at Strathcona South
Norman Kwong	Canadian football	Lieutenant Governor of Alberta (2005–2010)
Edgar Laprade	Ice hockey (NHL)	Port Arthur City Councillor (1959–1970); Thunder Bay City Councillor (1970–1972)
Georges Laraque	Ice hockey (NHL)	Deputy Leader of the Green Party of Canada (2010–2013)
Penny LaRocque	Curling (1983 Scott Tournament of Hearts winner)	Candidate in the 1988 Nova Scotia general election at Halifax Bedford Basin
Jeane Lassen	Weightlifting (Commonwealth champion)	Candidate in the 2016 Yukon general election at Takhini-Kopper King
Robert Lebel	Ice hockey (Quebec Senior Hockey League)	Mayor of Chambly, Quebec (1955–1957)
Edgar Leduc	Ice hockey (Montreal Canadiens)	MP for Jacques Cartier (1949–1953) and Jacques-Cartier—Lasalle (1953–1957); Mayor of Lachine, Quebec (1939–1944)
Richard Legendre	Tennis (Davis Cup)	Quebec MNA for Blainville (2001–2007)
Ron Lemieux	Ice hockey (United States Hockey League)	Manitoba MLA for La Verendrye (1999–2011) and Dawson Trail (2011–2016)
Doug Livingston	Archery	Yukon MLA for Lake Laberge (1996–1999)
Alexa Loo	Snowboarding (Olympic athlete)	Richmond City Councillor (2014–?)
Peter Lougheed	Canadian football (Edmonton Eskimos)	Premier of Alberta (1971–1985)
Cec Luining	Canadian football (Grey Cup)	Member of the Selkirk City Council
Neil Lumsden	Canadian football (CFL)	Ontario MPP for Hamilton East—Stoney Creek (2022–2026)
Don Luzzi	Canadian football (CFL)	Candidate in the 1971 Alberta general election at Calgary-Buffalo
Keith MacDonald	Ice hockey	Ontario MPP for Prince Edward—Lennox (1987–1990)
Gus MacFarlane	Rugby union (coach at Verdun Shamcats); Canadian football (coach at Mount Allison Mounties football)	MP for Hamilton Mountain (1974–1979)
Peter MacKay	Rugby union (Nova Scotia Keltics)	MP for Pictou—Antigonish—Guysborough (1997–2004) and Central Nova (2004–2015)
Bob MacMillan	Ice hockey (NHL)	Prince Edward Island MLA for Charlottetown-Kings Square (2000–2003)
Gordon MacMurchy	Ice hockey (player-coach for the Semans Wheat Kings)	Saskatchewan MLA for Last Mountain (1971–1975) and Last Mountain-Touchwood (1975–1982)
Nicolas Macrozonaris	Athletics (Olympic athlete)	Candidate in the 2017 Laval City Council election at Sainte-Dorothée District
Frank Mahovlich	Ice hockey (NHL)	Senator at Toronto (1998–2013)
Gene Makowsky	Canadian football (CFL)	Saskatchewan MLA for Regina Dewdney (2011–2016) and Regina Gardiner Park (2016–2024)
Gary Malkowski	Table tennis (Deaflympics)	Ontario MPP for York East (1990–1995)
Moe Mantha Sr.	Ice hockey (NHL)	MP for Nipissing (1984–1988)
Nevin Markwart	Ice hockey (309 NHL games)	Candidate in the 2023 Regina Walsh Acres provincial by-election
Richard Martel	Ice hockey (QMJHL coach)	MP for Chicoutimi—Le Fjord (2018–2026); Senator (2026–)
Steve Mazurak	Canadian football (CFL)	Candidate in the 1984 Canadian federal election at Regina West
Marnie McBean	Rowing (Olympic gold medalist)	Senator from Ontario (2023–)
Hazel McCallion	Ice hockey	Mayor of Mississauga (1978–2014)
Bob McDonald	Canadian football	MP for Hamilton South (1957–1963)
Wilfred McDonald	Ice hockey (NHL)	MP for Parry Sound (1945–1949) and Parry Sound-Muskoka (1949–1957)
Hugh McFadyen	Curling	Manitoba MLA for Fort Whyte (2005–2012)
Pat McGeer	Basketball (Olympic athlete)	British Columbia MLA for Vancouver-Point Grey (1962–1986)
Harold McGiverin	Cricket	MP for City of Ottawa (1908–1911; 1921–1925)
Walt McKechnie	Ice hockey (955 NHL games)	Mayor of Dysart et al (2026–)
D. C. McNeil	Ice hockey (minor leagues)	Nova Scotia MLA for Halifax West (1963–1967) and Halifax-St. Margaret's (1967–1970)
Roland Fairbairn McWilliams	Rugby union (1893 champion)	Lieutenant Governor of Manitoba (1940–1953)
Howie Meeker	Ice hockey (NHL)	MP for Waterloo South (1951–1953)
Vic Mercredi	Ice hockey (NHL)	Candidate in the 2011 Northwest Territories general election at Kam Lake
Jasmine Mian	Wrestling (Olympic athlete)	Calgary City Councillor for Ward 3
Mike Kanentakeron Mitchell	Lacrosse	Grand Chief of the Mohawk Council of Akwesasne (1984-after 2012)
Don Mitchell	Lacrosse (Brooklin Redmen)	Mayor of Whitby, Ontario (2014–2022)
Christie Mjolsness	Canoe polo	Alberta MLA for Edmonton-Calder (1986–1993)
Graeme Murray	Para ice hockey (Paralympic medalist)	Gravenhurst, Ontario Town Councillor
M. Wayne Neal	Canadian football (drafted by CFL)	Mayor of St. Thomas, Ontario (1975–1976)
Cindy Nicholas	Swimming	Ontario MPP for Scarborough Centre (1987–1990)
Tom O'Neill	Ice hockey (66 games for the Toronto Maple Leafs)	Candidate in the 1958 Canadian federal election at Rosedale
Stan Obodiac	Ice hockey (1951 World Ice Hockey Championships gold)	Candidate in the 1953 Canadian federal election at Yorkton
Gerry Organ	Canadian football (Grey Cup)	Candidate in the 1993 Canadian federal election at Guelph—Wellington
John Percy Page	Basketball (coached the Edmonton Grads)	Lieutenant Governor of Alberta (1959–1966)
Brian Pallister	Curling	Manitoba MLA for Portage la Prairie (1992–1997) and Fort Whyte (2012–2021); MP for Portage—Lisgar (2000–2008); Premier of Manitoba (2016–2021)
Steve Paproski	Canadian football	MP for Edmonton North (1968–1979) and Edmonton Centre (1979–1993)
Stephen Patrick	Canadian football (CFL)	Manitoba MLA for Assiniboia (1962–1977)
Lester B. Pearson	Baseball (Guelph Maple Leafs)	Prime Minister of Canada (1963–1968)
Janko Peric	Soccer	MP for Cambridge (1993–2004)
Chantal Petitclerc	Athletics (Paralympic medalist)	Senator at Grandville (2016–)
David Piccini	Soccer (coached the Ottawa Gee-Gees men's team)	Ontario MPP for Northumberland—Peterborough South (2018–)
Bob Pickering	Curling (Brier)	Saskatchewan MLA for Bengough-Milestone (1978–1991)
Hugh Plaxton	Ice hockey (Olympic medalist)	MP for Trinity (1935–1940)
Nelson D. Porter	Ice hockey (Ottawa Hockey Club)	Mayor of Ottawa (1915–1916)
Daniel Poudrier	Ice hockey (NHL)	Thetford Mines City Councillor at District 10
Charles Poulin	Ice hockey (CHL Player of the Year)	Candidate in the 2015 Canadian federal election at Brome—Missisquoi
Robert Pow	Curling (Olympic athlete)	Mayor of Fort William, Ontario (1933–1936)
Charles Gavan Power	Ice hockey (Quebec Bulldogs)	MP for Quebec South (1917–1955); Canadian Senator at Gulf (1955–1968)
Greg Power	Athletics (British Empire Games)	Newfoundland MLA for Placentia-St. Mary's (1951–1956) and Placentia East (1956–1959)
Joe Power	Ice hockey (NHL)	Quebec MNA for Québec-Ouest (1927–1935)
John Powers	Ice hockey (Ottawa City Hockey League)	Alderman on Ottawa City Council (1937–1951); Member of the Ottawa Board of Control (1951–1954)
Dwayne Provo	Canadian football (CFL)	Nova Scotia provincial candidate at Preston (2006 and 2009)
Doug Pruden	Endurance (world records for push-ups)	Candidate in the 1992 Edmonton municipal election at Ward 5
Carla Qualtrough	Swimming (Paralympic medalist)	MP for Delta (2015–2025)
Jack Radford	Canadian football (CFL)	British Columbia MLA for Vancouver South (1972–1975)
Dan Rashovich	Canadian football (CFL)	Member of Regina City Council
Colin Ratushniak	Ice skating (Manitoba men's novice champion)	Mayor of La Ronge (2020–2022)
Willard Reaves	Canadian football (Winnipeg Blue Bombers); American football (Miami Dolphins, Washington Redskins)	Leader of the Manitoba Liberal Party (2025–)
Frank Reid	Canadian football (CFL)	Ottawa-Carleton Regional Councillor at Nepean (1980s)
Jennifer Robinson	Figure skating (Olympic athlete)	Barrie City Councillor at Ward 8 (2010–2012)
John Beverley Robinson	Cricket	Mayor of Toronto (1856); MP for Algoma (1872–1874) and West Toronto (1875–1880); Lieutenant Governor of Ontario (1880–1887)
Philip Ross	Ice hockey (Ottawa Senators)	Ottawa City Councillor (1902–1903)
Samuel Rothschild	Ice hockey (NHL)	Greater Sudbury City Councillor
Doug Routley	Cycling	British Columbia MLA for Cowichan-Ladysmith (2005–2009) and Nanaimo-North Cowichan (2009–2024)
Jack Roxburgh	Ice hockey (junior leagues)	MP for Norfolk (1962–1968)
Louis Rubenstein	Figure skating	Montreal Alderman at St Louis Ward (1916–1931)
Terry Ryan	Ice hockey (8 games for the Montreal Canadiens)	Candidate for Mount Pearl City Council
Fred Sasakamoose	Ice hockey (NHL)	Ahtahkakoop Cree Nation Chief
Brian Saunderson	Rowing (Olympic athlete)	Mayor of Collingwood, Ontario (2018–2022); Ontario MPP for Simcoe—Grey (2022–)
Tubby Schmalz	Ice hockey (coached the Walkerton Capitols)	Reeve of Walkerton, Ontario (1979–1981)
Toby Sexsmith	Ice hockey (Portage la Prairie men's team)	Manitoba MLA for Portage la Prairie (1933–1943)
Tom Shypitka	Curling (Brier)	British Columbia MLA for Kootenay East (2017–2024)
Max Silverman	Ice hockey (coached the Canada men's national team)	Mayor of Sudbury, Ontario (1966)
Jim Silye	Canadian football (Grey Cup)	MP for Calgary Centre (1993–1997)
Bob Simpson	Canadian football (CFL); Basketball (Olympic athlete)	Ottawa City Councillor at Wellington Ward (1960–1963)
Scott Sinclair	Ice hockey (Saskatchewan Junior Hockey League champion)	Alberta MLA for Lesser Slave Lake (2023–)
George Sleeman	Ice hockey (Guelph Maple Leafs)	Mayor of Guelph, Ontario (1880-1882; 1905-1906)
Bill Smith	Canadian football (Grey Cup)	Mayor of Edmonton (1995–2004)
Larry Smith	Canadian football (Grey Cup)	Senator at Saurel (2010–2026)
Greg Smith	Curling (2018/2021 winner of the Newfoundland and Labrador Tankard)	Candidate for St. John's City Council in several elections
Ron Smith	Ice hockey (11 games for the New York Islanders)	Mayor of Port Hope, Ontario (1994–2000)
David Sprague	Canadian football (CFL)	Ottawa City Councillor at Elmdale Ward (1940)
George Springate	Canadian football (CFL)	Quebec MNA for Sainte-Anne (1970–1976) and Westmount (1976–1981)
Jack St. John	Ice hockey (St. Louis Flyers, etc.)	Manitoba MLA for Winnipeg Centre (1953–1958)
Thomas Steen	Ice hockey (NHL)	Winnipeg City Councillor at Elmwood/East Kildonan Ward (2010–2014)
Michelle Stilwell	Athletics (Paralympic medalist)	British Columbia MLA for Parksville-Qualicum (2013–2020)
Michael Strange	Boxing (Olympic athlete)	Niagara Falls City Councillor (2014–); Candidate in the 2018 Ontario general election at Niagara Falls; not nominated
Annis Stukus	Canadian football (played 45 games for the Toronto Argonauts; coached the Edmonton Eskimos and BC Lions)	Candidate in the 1969 British Columbia general election at North Vancouver-Seymour
Joseph Albert Sullivan	Ice hockey (Olympic medalist)	Senator at North York (1957–1965)
Bruny Surin	Track and field (Olympic medalist)	Candidate in a 2019 by-election for Laval City Council
Chris Szarka	Canadian football (CFL)	Regina City Councillor at Ward 10 (2009–2012)
Cyclone Taylor	Ice hockey	Candidate in the 1952 British Columbia general election at Vancouver Centre
Linda Thom	Shooting (Olympic medalist)	Candidate in the 1995 Ontario general election at Ottawa South
Frederick John Thompson	Boxing	Saskatchewan MLA for Athabasca (1975–1995)
John M. Tobin	Ice hockey (college)	Newfoundland MLA for St. John's East Extern (1928–1932)
Pierre Trudeau	Judo (nidan)	Prime Minister of Canada (1968–1979; 1980–1984)
John Turner	Athletics (track sprinting; Olympic prospect)	Prime Minister of Canada (1984)
Larry Uteck	Canadian football (CFL)	Halifax Regional Councillor at District 13 (1995–1999)
Adam van Koeverden	Sprint kayaking (Olympic medalist)	MP for Milton (2019–2025) and Burlington North—Milton West (2025–); Minister of Sport and Physical Activity (2025–)
Dan Vandal	Boxing (top national middleweight, 1983)	Deputy Mayor of Winnipeg (2003–2004); Acting Mayor of Winnipeg (2004); MP for Saint Boniface—Saint Vital (2015–2025)
Josh Vander Vies	Boccia (Paralympic medalist)	Candidate in the 2021 Canadian federal election at Vancouver East
Fitz Vanderpool	Boxing	Candidate in the 2018 Ontario general election at Kitchener South—Hespeler
Cory Vanthuyne	Curling (Northwest Territories Men's Curling Championship)	Northwest Territories MLA for Yellowknife North (2015–2019)
Nicholas Vinnicombe	Ice hockey	Newfoundland MLA for St. John's East (1928–1932)
Stan Wadlow	Soccer (National Soccer League)	Alderman for East York, Ontario (1972-?)
Galen Wahlmeier	Canadian football (Grey Cup)	Mayor of Estevan, Saskatchewan
Tony Wakeham	Basketball (two of the Newfoundland and Labrador men's teams at the Canada Winter Games)	Premier of Newfoundland and Labrador (2025–)
Ray Watrin	Canadian football (Grey Cup)	Okotoks Town Councillor (2010–)
Richard Deans Waugh	Curling	Mayor of Winnipeg
Andrew Weaver	Chess	British Columbia MLA for Oak Bay-Gordon Head (2013–2020)
Reg Wheeler	Canadian football (Winnipeg Blue Bombers and Edmonton Eskimos)	Winnipeg City Councillor
Keith White	Marathon (2024 Berlin Marathon, 2025 Chicago Marathon)	Newfoundland and Labrador MHA for St. John's West (2025–)
Dan Wicklum	Canadian football (Grey Cup)	Candidate in the 2004 Canadian federal election at Carleton—Lanark
Errick Willis	Curling (Olympic medalist)	Lieutenant Governor of Manitoba (1960–1965); MP for Souris (1930–1935); Manitoba MLA for Deloraine (1936–1945) and Turtle Mountain (1945–1960)
Evan Maurice Wolfe	Curling	British Columbia MLA for Vancouver Centre (1966–1972) and Vancouver-Little Mountain (1975–1983)
Peter Wong	Curling (Brier)	Mayor of Greater Sudbury (1982–1991); Chair of Regional Municipality of Sudbury (1997–1998)
Joseph Wright	Rowing (Olympic medalist)	Toronto City Councillor (1928–1931)
Daniel Yanofsky	Chess (eight-time Canadian Chess Champion)	Mayor of West Kildonan, Manitoba; Winnipeg City Councillor (1970–1986); Candidate in the 1959 Manitoba general election at St. Johns
Steve Young	Ice hockey (Western Hockey League)	Alberta MLA for Edmonton-Riverview (2012–2015)

=== Cuba ===
Name	Sport	Position
Yarisleidis Cirilo	Canoeing (Olympic medalist)	Member of the National Assembly of People's Power (2023–)

=== Curaçao ===
Name	Sport	Position
William Millerson		

=== Dominican Republic ===
Name	Sport	Position
Raúl Mondesí		

=== El Salvador ===
Name	Sport	Position
Wilfredo Iraheta	Association football	Candidate in the 2011 San Salvador mayoral election

=== Guatemala ===
Name	Sport	Position
Luis Alberto Flores Asturias	Athletics (Olympic athlete)	Vice President (1996–2000)
Dwight Pezzarossi		

=== Honduras ===
Name	Sport	Position
Chelato Uclés		

=== Mexico ===
Name	Sport	Position
Herminio Ahumada	Athletics (Olympic athlete)	President of the Chamber of Deputies (1944)
Cuauhtémoc Blanco	Association football	Mayor of Cuernavaca (2016–18); Currently governor of the state of Morelos (2018–present).
Ana Guevara	Olympic track and field athlete	Senator (2012–2018)
Jesús Hernández Hernández		
Jorge Kahwagi		
Felipe Muñoz	Swimming (Olympic athlete)	Member of the Chamber of Deputies
Rommel Pacheco		
Roberto Ruiz Esparza		

=== Nicaragua ===
Name	Sport	Position
Alexis Argüello	Boxing	Mayor of Managua

=== Saint Kitts and Nevis ===
Name	Sport	Position
Vance Amory	Cricket (List-A)	Premier of Nevis (1992–2006; 2013–2017)

=== Trinidad and Tobago ===
Name	Sport	Position
Ato Boldon	Athletics (Olympic medalist)	Senator (2006–2007)
Selwyn Charles		
Learie Constantine		
Clifton De Coteau		
Mervyn Dillon		
Marilyn Gordon	Athletics (javelin)	MP, senator and minister
Wendell Mottley	Athletics (Olympic medalist)	Senator; MP; Minister of Finance (1991–1995)
David Nakhid		
Jean Pierre		
Brent Sancho	Association football (national team)	Minister of Sport (2015–?)

== Oceania ==
=== Australia ===
Name	Sport	Position
John Alexander	Tennis (Davis Cup and Australian Open Doubles winner)	MP for Bennelong (2010–)
Edward Angelo	Australian rules football (Rovers Football Club)	Western Australia MLA at Gascoyne (1917–1933); Western Australia MLC at North Province (1934–1940)
John Atkinson	Wrestling (state champion)	Mayor of Toowoomba (1913)
Darrel Baldock	Australian rules football	Tasmanian MHA for Lyons and Wilmot (1972–1987)
Henry Barwell	Lawn bowls	Premier of South Australia (1920–1924); Senator for South Australia (1925–1928)
Frank Beaurepaire	Swimming (Olympic medalist)	Lord Mayor of Melbourne (1940–1942)
Bob Bennett	Rugby league	Candidate in the 2006 Queensland state election at Electoral district of Southport
Tony Benneworth	Cricket (Tasmania)	Tasmanian MHA (1992–1998)
Cory Bernardi	Rowing (1989 World Rowing Championships)	Senator for South Australia (2006–)
Ted Best	Athletics (British Empire Games medalist)	Lord Mayor of Melbourne (1969–1971)
John Beveridge	Cricket (captain)	Mayor of Redfern (1891)
Shane Broad	Rowing (world championship)	Tasmanian MHA for Braddon (2017–)
Jim Brown	Australian rules football (1949 WANFL season)	Western Australia MLA at Merredin-Yilgarn (1971–1974); Western Australia MLC at South-East Province (1980–1989) and Agricultural Region (1989–1992)
William Cameron	Cricket (New South Wales cricket team)	New South Wales MLA for Upper Hunter (1918–1920; 1927–1931) and Maitland (1920–1927)
Steve Cansdell	Boxing (national light heavyweight champion)	New South Wales MLA for Clarence (2003–2011)
Elaine Cassidy	Bridge (gold life master)	Mayor of Woollahra (1988–1989)
Gilbert Chandler	Australian rules football (one game at 1928 VFL season)	Victoria MLC at South Eastern Province (1935–1937), Southern Province (1937–1967), and Boronia Province (1967–1973)
Ric Charlesworth	Cricket (first-class); Field hockey (Olympic medalist)	MP for Perth (1983–1993)
Bob Cheek	Australian rules football (Clarence Football Club)	Tasmania MHA for Denison (1996–2002)
Don Chipp	Australian rules football (Victorian Football League)	MP for Higinbotham (1960–1969) and Hotham (1969–1977); Senator for Victoria (1978–1986); Leader of the Australian Democrats (1977–1986)
Geoff Clark	Boxing	Aboriginal and Torres Strait Islander Commission Chairman (1999–2004)
Ron Clarke	Athletics (Olympic and Commonwealth medalist)	Mayor of the Gold Coast (2004–2012)
Michael Cleary	Rugby union and rugby league Athletics (Commonwealth medalist)	New South Wales MLA for Coogee (1974–1991)
Phil Cleary	Australian rules football (Victorian Football Association)	MP for Wills (1992; 1993–1996)
Morton Cohen	Cricket (first-class)	New South Wales MLA for Bligh (1965–1968)
Percy Colquhoun	Rugby union Tennis (1908 Australian Open QF)	New South Wales MLA for Mosman (1913–1920)
E. H. Coombe	Cricket (first-class)	South Australia MHA for Barossa (1901–1912; 1915–1917)
Matt Cowdrey	Swimming (Paralympic medalist)	South Australia MHA for Colton (2018–)
Joe Darling	Cricket (Test)	Tasmania MLC for Cambridge (1921–1946)
Everard Darlot	Australian rules football	Western Australia MLA for East Kimberley (1890–1894)
Dexter Davies	Australian rules football (WANFL)	Western Australia MLC for Agricultural Region (1998–2001)
John George Davies	Cricket (first-class)	Tasmania MHA for Fingal (1884–1909) and Denison (1909–1913)
Brian Davison	Cricket (first-class)	Tasmania MHA for Franklin (1990–1996)
Hugh Delahunty	Australian rules football (VFL)	Victoria MLA for Wimmera (1999–2002) and Lowan (2002–2014)
John Devine	Australian rules football (VFL and TFL)	Tasmania MHA for Denison (1979–1984)
Richard Di Natale	Australian rules football (VFA)	Senator for Victoria (2011–2020); Leader of the Australian Greens (2015–2020)
Brian Dixon	Australian rules football (VFL)	Victoria MLA for Electoral district of St Kilda (1964–1982)
Jerry Dolan	Australian rules football	Western Australia MLC for West Province (1963–1974)
Adye Douglas	Cricket (first-class)	Premier of Tasmania (1884–1886)
Richard Driver	Cricket (New South Wales cricket team)	New South Wales MLA for West Macquarie (1860–1869), Carcoar (1869–1872), and Windsor (1872–1880)
Damian Drum	Australian rules football (AFL)	MP for Murray (2016–2019) and Nicholls (2019–); Victoria MLC for North Western Province (2002–2006) and Northern Victoria Region (2006–2016)
Thomas Duff	Australian rules football	Western Australia MLA at Claremont (1918–1921)
Henry Dumaresq	Cricket (first-class)	Tasmania MHA for Longford
David Dunworth	Rugby union (national team)	Queensland MLA for Sherwood (1990–1992)
Charles Eady	Cricket and Australian rules football	President of the Tasmanian Legislative Council (1944–1945)
Alistair Edwards	Association football (national team)	Cockburn City Councillor (2002–2006)
Ross Elliott	Australian rules football	Western Australia MLA for Canning (1965–1968)
Hadyn Evans	Lawn bowls (Commonwealth medalist)	Norfolk Island MLA (2013–2015)
Clive Evatt	Rugby league	New South Wales MLA for Hurstville (1939–1959)
Pat Farmer	Athletics (ultramarathon)	MP for Macarthur (2001–2010)
John Fihelly	Rugby league (1907–08 New Zealand rugby tour of Australia and Great Britain)	Queensland MLA for Paddington (1912–1922)
John Fletcher	Cricket (first-class)	Queensland MLA for Port Curtis (1920–1923); Booringa Shire Council Chairman (1931)
Tom Fox	Australian rules football	Western Australia MLA for South Fremantle (1935–1951)
Alexander Fraser	Australian rules football (VFL)	Victoria MLA for Grant (1950–1952), Caulfield East (1955–1958), and Caulfield (1958–1965)
Dawn Fraser	Swimming (Olympic medalist)	New South Wales MLA for Balmain
Gordon Freeth	Rowing (British Empire Games medalist)	MP for Forrest (1949–1969)
George Thomas Gahan	Boxing	Mayor of Prahran, Victoria (1965–1966; 1970–1971)
John Galbally	Australian rules football (VFL)	Victoria MLC for Melbourne North Province (1949–1979)
Albert Gardiner	Rugby union	Senator for New South Wales (1910–1926; 1928)
Jack Gervasoni	Australian rules football (VFL)	Mayor of Kew, Victoria (1978)
Paul Gibson	Rugby league (New South Wales Rugby League premiership)	New South Wales MLA for Londonderry (1988–1999) and Blacktown (1999–2011)
Alex Gillon	Australian rules football (VFA)	Mayor of the City of Brunswick (?–?)
Bob Giltinan	Tennis (Davis Cup winner)	Warringah Councillor (2008-after 2012)
Allan Grice	Auto racing (Bathurst 1000)	Queensland MLA for Broadwater (1992–2001)
Ray Groom	Australian rules football (VFL)	Premier of Tasmania (1992–1996); MP for Braddon (1975–1984); Tasmania MHA for Denison (1986–2001)
Sam Groth	Tennis (ATP top 60); Australian rules football (amateur)	Victorian MP for Nepean (2022–present)
Arthur Gull	Australian rules football	Western Australia MLA at Swan (1905–1908)
Damian Hale	Australian rules football and rugby league	MP for Solomon (2007–2010)
Peter Hall	Australian rules football (VFL)	Victoria MLA for Gippsland Province (1988–2006) and Eastern Victoria Region (2006–2014)
Thomas Ferrier Hamilton	Cricket (Melbourne Cricket Club original member)	Victoria MLC for Southern Province (1871–1884)
Jim Handby	Australian rules football (SANFL)	MP for Kingston (1949–1951)
Kevin Hardiman	Australian rules football (VFL)	Mayor of Preston, Victoria (1967–1968)
John Hardwick	Australian rules football	Western Australia MLA for East Perth (1904–1911; 1914–1921)
Stan Heal	Australian rules football	Western Australia MLA for West Perth (1953–1962) and Perth (1962–1965)
John Hearman	Rowing (King's Cup)	Western Australia MLA for Blackwood (1950–1968)
James Hegney	Australian rules football	Western Australia MLA for Middle Swan (1930–1947; 1950–1962) and Belmont (1962–1968)
Ernest Henty	Australian rules football	Western Australia MLC for Central Province (1894–1895)
William Henty	Cricket (first-class)	Tasmania MLC for Tamar (1856–1862)
Matthew Hervey	Cricket (first-class)	Victoria MLC for Murray (1853–1856) and Eastern Province (1856–1865)
Lionel Hill	Australian rules football (Norwood Football Club)	Premier of South Australia (1926–1927; 1930–1933)
Mac Holten	Australian rules football	MP for Indi (1958–1977)
Robert Otto Homburg	Cricket (first-class)	South Australia MHA for Burra Burra (1912–1915)
Mike Horan	Rugby league (Parramatta Eels); Rugby union	Queensland MLA for Toowoomba South (1991–2012)
Thomas Hughes	Australian rules football	Western Australia MLA for East Perth (1922–1927; 1936–1943)
Brian Hurn	Cricket (first-class)	Mayor of Barossa Council (1996–2014)
Emma Hurst	Bodybuilding	New South Wales MLC (2019–)
Ross Hutchinson	Australian rules football	Western Australia MLA for Cottesloe (1950–1977)
Percy Hutton	Cricket (first-class)	City of Unley Councillor (?–?)
Steve Irons	Australian rules football (WAFL)	MP for Swan (2007–2022)
Francis Ivory	Golf (first one in Queensland)	Queensland MLA for Burnett (1873–1878); Queensland Legislative Councillor (1879–1881)
Walter James	Australian rules football	Premier of Western Australia (1902–1904)
Shirley Jeffries	Australian rules football (SAFL)	South Australia MHA for North Adelaide (1927–1930; 1933–1938) and Torrens (1938–1944; 1947–1953)
James Kennedy	Australian rules football	Victoria MLC for Higinbotham Province (1937–1954); Mayor of the City of Brighton (1932–1933)
Wilfrid Kent Hughes	Athletics (Olympic athlete)	MP for Chisholm (1949–1970); Victorian MLA for Kew (1927–1949)
Walter Kingsmill	Australian rules football	Senator for Western Australia (1923–1935)
Ted Kinnear	Australian rules football (VFL)	Mayor of Essendon, Victoria (1919; 1920)
Gil Langley	Australian rules football (SANFL); Cricket (first-class)	South Australia MHA for Unley (1962–1982)
Joseph Langsford	Australian rules football	Western Australia MLC at Metropolitan-Suburban Province (1904–1911)
Edward Larkin	Rugby union (national team)	New South Wales MLA for Willoughby (1913–1915) (Note: As Edward Larkin)
John Latham	Lacrosse	Chief Justice of Australia (1935–1952); MP for Kooyong (1922–1934)
Glenn Lazarus	Rugby league (international level)	Senator for Queensland (2014–2016)
John Leckie	Australian rules football (Fitzroy Football Club)	MP for Indi (1917–1919); Senator for Victoria (1935–1947)
Mervyn Lee	Australian rules football (Acton Football Club)	MP for Lalor (1966–1969)
Henry Lette	Cricket (first-class)	Tasmania MHA for Launceston (1862–1871), Central Launceston (1871–1877), and North Launceston (1877–1892)
Sam Loxton	Cricket (Test); Australian rules football (VFL)	Victoria MLA for Prahran (1955–1979)
Brendan Lyons	Australian rules football (1948 Australian Amateur Football Carnival)	Tasmania MHA for Bass (1982–1986)
Justin Madden	Australian rules football (AFL)	Victoria MLA for Essendon (2010–2014)
Jim Manson	Australian rules football (Glenorchy Football Club)	Glenorchy City Councillor (1996–2010)
Arthur Marshall	Australian rules football	Western Australia MLA for Murray (1993–1996) and Dawesville (1996–2005)
Bob Marshall	Billiards (World Amateur Billiards Championship)	Western Australia MLA for Maylands (1965–?)
Kirstie Marshall	Freestyle skiing (world champion)	Victoria MLA for Forest Hill (2002–2010)
Ron McAuliffe	Rugby league (Northern Suburbs)	Senator for Queensland
Alick McCallum	Australian rules football	Western Australia MLA for South Fremantle (1922–1935)
Bill McGrath	Australian rules football (VFL)	Victoria MLA for Lowan (1979–1992) and Wimmera (1992–1999)
Charles McGrath	Australian rules football (South Ballarat Football Club)	MP for Ballaarat (1913–1919; 1920–1934)
Frank McGuren	Rugby league (North Sydney Bears)	MP for Cowper (1961–1963)
Ian McLachlan	Cricket (first-class)	MP for Barker (1990–1998)
Tom McNeil	Australian rules football	Western Australia MLA for Upper West Province (1977–1989)
Ray McPharlin	Australian rules football	Western Australia MLA for Mount Marshall (1967–1983)
Bob Miller	Australian rules football (VFL)	Victoria MLA for Prahran (1979–1985)
Tom Mitchell	Alpine skiing	Victoria MLA for Benambra (1947–1976)
Frederick Monger	Australian rules football	Western Australia MLA at York (1892–1903; 1905–1914)
William Moule	Cricket (Test)	Victoria MLA (?–1900)
Jack Mundey	Rugby league (Parramatta Eels)	City of Sydney Council (1984–1987)
Dean Nalder	Australian rules football	Western Australia MLA at Alfred Cove (2013–2017) and Bateman (2017–)
Mick Nanovich	Australian rules football	Western Australia MLA at Toodyay (1974–1977) and Whitford (1977–1983)
Chris Natt	Australian rules football (SANFL)	Northern Territory MLA at Drysdale (2005–2008)
Frederic North	Cricket (first-class)	Mayor of the Municipality of Cottesloe (1911–1916)
Joseph O'Carroll	Australian rules football (VFL)	Victoria MLA for Clifton Hill (1949–1955)
Ray O'Connor	Australian rules football	Premier of Western Australia (1982–1983)
Hubert Opperman	Cyclist (Tour de France)	MP for Corio (1949–1967)
Paul Osborne	Rugby league (first-grade)	ACT MLA for Brindabella electorate (1995–2001)
Stephen Patterson	Australian rules football (AFL)	South Australia MHA for Morphett (2018–); Mayor of City of Holdfast Bay (2014–2018)
Nova Peris	Field hockey (Olympic gold)	Senator for Northern Territory (2013–2016)
Bruce Pie	Australian rules football (one game at 1926 VFL season)	Queensland MLA for Hamilton (1941–1943), Windsor (1944–1950), and Kedron (1950–1951)
David Pocock	Rugby union (international level)	Senator for the Australian Capital Territory (2022–present)
Robert Evelyn Porter	Polo (champion)	Mayor of Adelaide (1968–1971)
Frederick Powlett	Cricket (first-class)	Treasurer of Victoria (1852–1853)
Dan Repacholi	Pistol shooting (Commonwealth Games medalist and Olympian)	MP for Hunter (2022–)
Maurice Rioli	Australian rules football (NTFL, WAFL, and VFL)	Northern Territory MLA for Arafura (1992–2001)
Greg Rowell	Cricket (List A)	Candidate in the 2008 Brisbane City Council election for Lord Mayor
Kevin Ryan	Rugby (dual-code rugby international)	New South Wales MLA for Hurstville (1976–1984); Mayor of the City of Hurstville (1974–1979)
Arthur Rymill	Polo (interstate)	Lord Mayor of Adelaide (1950–1953)
Don Seccombe	Cricket (first-class)	Mayor of Redland City (2001–2008)
Doug Shave	Australian rules football	Western Australia MLA at Melville (1989–1996) and Alfred Cove (1996–2001)
Maurie Sheehy	Australian rules football (VFL)	Victoria MLC (1952–1958)
Nicholas Shehadie	Rugby union (Test)	Lord Mayor of Sydney (1973–1975)
Glen Sheil	Tennis (Australian Championships competitor)	Senator for Queensland (1974–1981; 1984–1990)
Jack Simpson	Australian rules football (VFL)	Victoria MLA for Niddrie (1976–1988)
Charles Sladen	Cricket	Premier of Victoria (1868)
Matt Smith	Basketball (Cairns Taipans)	MP for Leichhardt (2019–)
Tim Smith	Rowing (2004 World Rowing Championships)	Victoria MLA for Kew (2014–)
Trevor Sprigg	Australian rules football	Western Australia MLA at Murdoch (2005–2008)
Zali Steggall	Alpine skiing (Olympic medalist)	MP for Warringah (2019–)
Frank Stewart	Rugby league (Canterbury-Bankstown Bulldogs)	MP for Lang (1953–1977) and Grayndler (1977–1979)
Shirley Strickland	Athletics (Olympic and British Empire Games medalist)	Perennial candidate (see her page for her election info); City of Melville Councillor (1988–1996; 1999–2003)
Bill Sykes	Australian rules football (VFL)	Victoria MLA for Benalla (2002–2014)
Joe Szakacs	Swimming (2002–03 FINA Swimming World Cup)	South Australia MHA for Cheltenham (2019–)
Liesl Tesch	Wheelchair basketball (Olympic gold)	New South Wales MLA for Gosford (2017–)
Murray Thompson	Australian rules football (Richmond Football Club)	Victoria MLA for Sandringham (1992–2018)
Rex Townley	Cricket (first-class)	Tasmania MHA for Denison (1946–1965)
Neil Trezise	Australian rules football (VFL)	Victoria MLA for Geelong West (1964–1967) and Geelong North (1967–2002)
William Tunks	Cricket (first-class)	New South Wales MLA for St Leonards (1864–1874); Mayor of St Leonards (1867–1883)
Dan van Holst Pellekaan	Basketball (Hobart Devils)	South Australia MHA for Stuart (2010–)
Mick Veivers	Rugby league (international level)	Queensland MLA for Southport (1987–2001)
Tom Veivers	Cricket (Test)	Queensland MLA for Ashgrove (1983–1986)
Charles Veryard	Australian rules football (West Perth Football Club)	Lord Mayor of Perth (1964–1967)
Ken Vowles	Cricket (Australia national under-19 cricket team)	Northern Territory MLA at Johnston (2012–)
Charles Wade	Rugby union (university and national team)	Premier of New South Wales (1907–1910); New South Wales MLA for Gordon (1904–1917)
Terry Waldron	Australian rules football	Western Australia MLA at Wagin (2001–2017)
William Walker	Yachting (Royal Sydney Yacht Squadron)	New South Wales MLC (1863–1867)
Edward Wolstenholme Ward	Cricket	New South Wales MLC (1861–1865)
Jim Wilkinson	Australian rules football (VFL)	President of the Tasmanian Legislative Council (2013–2019)
Bill Young	Australian rules football	Western Australia MLA at Roe (1967–1974)
Tony Zappia	Powerlifting	MP for Makin (2007–)

=== Fiji ===
Name	Sport	Position
Edward Cakobau		
George Cakobau		
Frederick Clapcott		
Iliesa Delana		
Penaia Ganilau		
Harold Brockett Gibson		
Hector Hatch	Boxing (Olympic athlete)	Cabinet minister
Farouk Janeman		
Penaia Kadavulevu		
Marika Latianara		
Kamisese Mara		
Pita Nacuva		
Sitiveni Rabuka	Athletics (1974 British Commonwealth Games)	Prime Minister of Fiji (1992–1999)
Jagannath Sami		
Henry Milne Scott		
Ilaitia Tuisese		
Nat Uluiviti		
Samuela Vunivalu	Rugby union	Member of the Parliament of Fiji (2014–2018)

=== Kiribati ===
Name	Sport	Position
David Collins	Association football	Minister for Women, Youth and Sports; Minister of Education; MP for Maiana

=== Nauru ===
Name	Sport	Position
Sprent Dabwido	Weightlifting	President of Nauru (2011–2013); MP for Meneng (2004–2016)
Valdon Dowiyogo	Association football (national championship)	MP for Ubenide (2004–2016)
Maverick Eoe	Powerlifting	MP for Anabar (2019–present)
Russell Kun	Powerlifting	Speaker of the Parliament of Nauru (2004); MP for Ubenide (2003–2004)
Marcus Stephen	Weightlifting (Commonwealth medalist)	President of Nauru (2007–2011); MP for Anetan (2003–2016)

=== New Zealand ===
Name	Sport	Position
Paul Adams	Rally driving (champion)	MP for United Future (2002–2005)
Eric Armishaw	Boxing (national welterweight champion)	Auckland City Councillor (1953–1971)
Doug Armstrong	Cricket (first-class)	Mayor of Rodney District (1992–2000)
Tommy Armstrong	Boxing; Rugby league (Canterbury Rugby League)	MP for Napier (1943–1951)
Erin Baker	Triathlon (world champion)	Christchurch City Councillor
Philippa Baker	Rowing (Commonwealth medalist)	Wanganui District Councillor (2006–)
Jim Barnes	Athletics (cross-country)	MP for St Kilda (1951–1957); Mayor of Dunedin (1968–1977)
Francis Bell	Cricket (first-class)	MP for Wellington (1893–1896)
Denis Blundell	Cricket (first-class)	Governor-General of New Zealand (1972–1977)
Stephen Boock	Cricket (first-class)	Dunedin City Councillor (1992–?)
James Benn Bradshaw	Cricket	MP for Gold Field Towns (1866–1870), Waikaia (1871–1875), and Dunedin Central (1884–1886)
Frank Buckland	Cricket (first-class)	MP for Franklin North (1884–1887) and Manukau (1890–1893)
Martin Chapman	Cricket (first-class)	Wellington City Councillor (1888–1890)
Tony Coll	Rugby league (national team)	Grey District Councillor (2011–?)
John Collinge	Cricket (university)	President of the New Zealand National Party (1989–1994)
William Collins	Cricket (first-class)	New Zealand Legislative Councillor (1907–1934)
Graham Condon	Swimming (Paralympic champion)	Christchurch City Councillor (1995-after 2007)
Joe Cotterill	Rugby and field hockey (Wanganui)	MP for Wanganui (1935–1960)
Ben Couch	Rugby union (All Blacks)	MP for Wairarapa (1975–1984)
Tuariki Delamere	Athletics (Commonwealth athlete)	MP for Te Tai Rawhiti (1996–1999)
Billy Dillicar	Lawn bowls (1934 British Empire Games)	Hamilton Borough Councillor (?-?)
Quentin Donald	Rugby union (All Blacks)	Featherston County Councillor (1938–1965)
Roger Drayton	Cricket and association football (Royal New Zealand Air Force)	MP for St Albans (1969–1976)
Thomas Ellison	Rugby union (1888–89 New Zealand Native football team)	Candidate in the general elections at Southern Maori
Frank Fisher	Tennis (Australian Open finalist)	MP for Wellington (1905) and Wellington Central (1905–1910; 1911–1914)
Billy Glenn	Rugby union (All Blacks)	MP for Rangitīkei (1919–1928)
Ken Gray	Rugby union (All Blacks)	Porirua City Councillor (1973–1980), Wellington Regional Councillor (1986–1992)
Barrie Hutchinson	Water polo (British Empire Games medalist)	Auckland City Councillor (1983–1989)
Thomas Jordan	Rugby union (played in the Ranfurly Shield)	Mayor of Masterton (1925–1944)
Colin Kay	Athletics (British Empire and Commonwealth athlete)	Mayor of Auckland City (1980–1983)
David Kirk	Rugby union (All Blacks)	Candidate in the 1992 Tamaki by-election; not nominated
Alexander Kirkpatrick	Rugby union (All Blacks)	Deputy Mayor of Hastings (?-?, 18 years)
Ken Laban	Rugby league (Wainuiomata Lions)	Mayor of Lower Hutt (2025–)
Chris Laidlaw	Rugby union (All Blacks)	MP for Wellington Central (1992–1993); Wellington Regional Council Chairperson (2015–)
Martin Luckie	Cricket (First-class)	Deputy Mayor of Wellington (1923–1931; 1936–1947)
Victor Macky	Rugby union (All Blacks)	Candidate for mayor of Auckland City in 1944
Les Mills	Athletics (Commonwealth athlete)	Mayor of Auckland City (1990–1998)
John Morrison	Cricket (international)	Wellington City Councillor (1998–2013)
William Murison	Cricket (first-class)	MP for Waikouaiti (1966–1968)
Tiaki Omana	Rugby union (All Blacks)	MP for Eastern Maori (1943–1963)
Tom Pearce	Rugby union (Auckland rugby union team)	Auckland City Councillor (1962–1968), Auckland Regional Councillor (1965–1976)
Winston Peters	Rugby union (university)	Acting Prime Minister of New Zealand (2018)
Hugh Poland	Rugby union (Auckland rugby union team)	MP for Ohinemuri (1905–1925)
Vic Pollard	Cricket (international)	Candidate in the general election for the Christian Heritage Party of New Zealand
The Lord Porritt	Athletics (Olympic medalist)	Governor-General of New Zealand (1967–1972)
Dick Quax	Athletics (Olympic medalist)	Manukau City Councillor (2001–2007); Auckland Councillor (2011–2018)
Paul Quinn	Rugby union (Māori All Blacks)	MP for the New Zealand National Party list (2008–2011)
William Lee Rees	Cricket	MP for Auckland East (1875–1879) and City of Auckland (1890–1893)
Ben Sandford	Skeleton racing (world championships)	Candidate in the 2017 New Zealand general election at Rotorua
Bhupinder Singh	Cricket (first-class)	Candidate in the 2017 New Zealand general election at Manukau East
Charles Speight	Rugby union (All Black)	Hamilton Borough Councillor
Tony Steel	Rugby union (All Black)	MP for Hamilton East (1990–1993; 1996–2002)
Edward Cephas John Stevens	Cricket	MP for Selwyn (1866–1870) and City of Christchurch (1876–1881); New Zealand Legislative Councillor (1882–1915)
William Stevenson	Rowing (national champion)	Mayor of Howick, New Zealand (1953–1962)
Bill Sullivan	Rugby union (Taranaki)	MP for Bay of Plenty (1941–1957)
Graham Sycamore	Cycling	Invercargill City Councillor (2001–2016)
Howie Tamati	Rugby league	New Plymouth District Councillor (1999–2007; 2010–2016); Candidate for Te Tai Hauāuru (2017)
Grahame Thorne	Rugby union (All Blacks)	MP for Onehunga (1990–1993)
Gary Troup	Cricket (Test)	Manukau City Councillor (2007–?)
Ian Tulloch	Auto racing	Mayor of Mataura (1983–1989)
John Walker	Athletics (Olympic medalist)	Auckland Councillor
Louisa Wall	Rugby union (national team); Netball (national team)	MP for Manurewa (2011–2020) and the Labour Party list (2008; 2011; 2020–2022)
Mike Ward	Coast to Coast (completed the first 28)	MP for the Green Party list (2002–2005)
Puti Tipene Watene	Rugby league	MP for Eastern Maori (1963–1967)
Ben Waters	Rowing (British Empire Games medalist)	Perennial candidate (see his page for details)
Richard White	Rugby union (All Blacks)	Mayor of Gisborne, New Zealand (1977–1983)
Stanley Whitehead	Rugby league	MP for Nelson (1957–1976)
Simon Wi Rutene	Alpine skiing (Olympic athlete)	List candidate in the 2005 New Zealand general election for the Māori Party
Hercules Wright	Rugby league (1907–08 New Zealand rugby tour of Australia and Great Britain)	Petone Borough Councillor
Tu Wyllie	Rugby union (All Blacks)	MP for Te Tai Tonga (1996–1999)

==== Cook Islands ====
Name	Sport	Position
Inatio Akaruru	Lawn bowls (Commonwealth athlete)	MP for Pukapuka; Deputy Prime Minister of the Cook Islands
Danielle Tungane Cochrane	Canoeing (2011 Pacific Games)	Minister of Education (2018–?)
William (Smiley) Heather	Rugby union (national team)	MP for Ruaau (2006–2022)
Albert Henry	Rugby union (played against the All Blacks in a friendly)	Premier of the Cook Islands (1965–1978)
Tekaotiki Matapo	Rugby union (national team captain); Athletics (national representative)	MP; Minister of Justice (1989–1999); President of the Cook Islands Party (2018–)
Selina Napa	Netball (national team)	MP for Titikaveka (2012–2022)
Akaiti Puna	Netball (Nagtangiia; managed the 1981 South Pacific Mini Games national team)	MP for Manihiki (2021–2026)
Kiriau Turepu	Tennis (1971 South Pacific Games)	MP for Matavera (2006; 2010–2018)

=== Papua New Guinea ===
Name	Sport	Position
Josephine Abaijah		
Lauta Atoi	Rugby league	Member of the National Parliament of Papua New Guinea (2011–2017)
John Kaputin	Athletics (Commonwealth athlete)	Foreign Minister (1992–1994; 1999–2000)
Noah Kool		
Michael Marum		
Walter Schnaubelt		
Anthony Siaguru		

=== Solomon Islands ===
Name	Sport	Position
Joseph Onika	Athletics (1990 Oceania Athletics Championships)	MP for East Central Guadalcanal (2010–present)

=== Tuvalu ===
Name	Sport	Position
Lotoala Metia	Association football	Minister of Finance (2010–2012); Minister for Finance, Economic Planning and Industries (2006–2010); MP for Nukufetau (2006–2012)
Kausea Natano	Association football	Prime Minister (2019–2024)

== South America ==
=== Argentina ===
Name	Sport	Position
Inés Arrondo		
Héctor Baldassi		
Héctor Campana	Basketball	Vice Governor of Cordoba Province (2007–2011)
Ariel Cozzoni		
Carlos Espínola	Windsurfing	Senator for Corrientes Province (from 2015); Mayor of Corrientes (2009–2013)
Nestor García-Veiga	Motorsport	
Mario Lobo		
Carlos Mac Allister		
Claudio Morresi		
Luis Rubén di Palma	Motorsport	
Aldo Poy		
Antonio Rattín		
Carlos Retegui		
Carlos Reutemann	Motorsport	Senator for Santa Fe Province (2003–2021); Governor of Santa Fe Province (1991–1995, 1999–2003)
Daniel Scioli	Offshore powerboat racing	Secretary of Tourism, Environment and Sports (from 2024); Minister of Productive Development (2022); Ambassador of Argentina to Brazil (2020–2024); Deputy for Buenos Aires Province (2017–2020); Governor of Buenos Aires Province (2007–2015); Vice President of Argentina (2003–2007); Deputy for the City of Buenos Aires (1997–2002)
Daniela Vilar		
Juan Zabaleta		

=== Bolivia ===
Name	Sport	Position
Cielo Veizaga	Football	Deputy Minister of Sport (2020–2023)

=== Brazil ===
Name	Sport	Position
Leila Barros	volleyball	Senator for the Federal District (from 2019)
Bebeto	Football	State deputy of Rio de Janeiro (2011–2023)
Biro-Biro		
Bobô	Football	State deputy of Bahia (from 2015)
Athiê Jorge Coury		
Harry Forssell	Swimming	
Acelino "Popó" Freitas	boxing	Federal deputy for Bahia (2011–2015)
Ademir da Guia	Football	São Paulo city councillor (2005–2008)
Danrlei	Football	Federal deputy for the Rio Grande do Sul (from 2011)
Éder Jofre		
João Leite		
Luiz Lima	Swimming	Federal deputy for the Rio de Janeiro (from 2019)
Mário Jardel	Football	State deputy of Rio Grande do Sul (2015–2016)
Aurélio Miguel		
Renan Miranda		
Ana Moser	Volleyball	Minister of Sports (from 2023)
João Carlos de Oliveira	Track and field	State deputy of São Paulo (1986–1994)
Paulo Sérgio		
Pelé	Football	Extraordinary Minister of Sport (1995–1998)
José Reinaldo de Lima		
Roberto Dinamite		
Róbson	Football	State deputy of Pará (2007–2011)
Romário	Football	Federal deputy (2011–15); Senator for Rio de Janeiro (from 2015)
Marta Sobral		
Rita Teixeira		
Carlos Alberto Torres		
Douglas Viegas		
Zé Maria		
Zico	Football	

=== Chile ===
Name	Sport	Position
Damaris Abarca	Chess	Member of the Constitutional Convention (2021–2022)
Jorge Acuña	Football	Candidate in the 2016 Chilean municipal elections
Juan José Albornoz	Football	Candidate in the 2024 Chilean municipal elections
Vicente Almonacid	Paralympic swimming	Candidate in the 2025 Chilean general election
Franz Arancibia	Football	Candidate in the 2012 Chilean municipal election
Alexandra Benado	Football (women's national team)	Minister of Sports (2022–2023)
José Luis Cabión	Football	Councilor of Melipilla (since 2021)
Matías Campos Toro	Football	Candidate in the 2021 Chilean municipal elections
Víctor Hugo Castañeda	Football	Candidate in the 2021 Chilean municipal elections Candidate in the 2021 Chilean general election
Sandrino Castec	Football	Candidate in the 2012 Chilean municipal elections Candidate in the 2016 Chilean municipal elections
Carlos Caszely	Football	Press attaché in sports in the Embassy of Chile in Spain (2014–2015)
Mauricio Cataldo	Football	Candidate in the 2016 Chilean municipal elections
Luis Ceballos	Football	Councilor of Lota (2012–2016)
Mariano Celasco	Football	Candidate in the 2024 Chilean municipal elections
Carlos Chandía	Football	Mayor of Coihueco (2012–2024); Member of the Chamber of Deputies (since 2026)
Jorge Contreras	Football	Candidate in the 2012 Chilean municipal election
Wilson Contreras	Football	Candidate in the 2012 Chilean municipal election
Ada Cruz	Football (women's national team)	Candidate in the 2013 Chilean general election Candidate in the 2021 Chilean municipal elections
Natalia Duco	Athletics (shot put)	Minister of Sports (2026); Advisor to the President of Chile (since 2026)
Óscar Fabbiani	Football	Councilor of Recoleta (1992–1996)
Marco Fajre	Football	Candidate in the 2024 Chilean regional elections
Ismael Fuentes	Football	Member of the Regional Council of Maule (since 2025)
Pablo Galdames	Football	Candidate in the 2017 Chilean general election
Jorge Garcés	Football	Candidate in the 2021 Chilean municipal elections Candidate in the 2025 Chilean general election
Aníbal González	Football	Councilor of Rancagua (2012–2016)
Ricardo González	Football	Candidate in the 2008 Chilean municipal election
Nicola Hadwa	Football	Candidate in the 2017 Chilean general election
David Henríquez	Football	Candidate in the 2017 Chilean general election
Leonel Herrera	Football	Councilor of Santiago (2012–2021)
Francisco Huaiquipán	Football	Candidate in the 2016 Chilean municipal elections
Pauline Kantor	Alpine skiing	Executive Secretary of the Bicentennial Commission (2010); Minister of Sports (2018–2019); Candidate in the 2021 Chilean Constitutional Convention election
Sebastián Keitel	Athletics (sprinting)	Candidate in the 2012 Chilean municipal election Member of the Chamber of Deputies (2018–2022); Member of the Senate (since 2022)
Norberto Ladrón de Guevara	Football; Rowing	Councilor (Regidor) of Municipality of Valparaíso; Member of the Chamber of Deputies (1949–1953)
Frank Lobos	Football	Councilor of Cerro Navia (since 2024)
Juan Gonzalo Lorca	Football	Candidate in the 2024 Chilean municipal elections
Juan Machuca	Football	Candidate in the 2016 Chilean municipal elections
Alí Manouchehri	Football	Mayor of Coquimbo (since 2021)
Patricio Mardones	Football	Candidate in the 2024 Chilean municipal elections
Rubén Martínez	Football	Candidate in the 2025 Chilean general election
Gabriel Mendoza	Football	Councilor of Viña del Mar (2016–2021); Candidate in the 2021 Chilean municipal elections
Pablo Milad	Athletics (shot put, combined track and field)	Intendant of the Maule Region (2018–2020)
Alexander "Sasha" Mitjaew	Football	Candidate in the 2017 Chilean general election
Daniel Morón	Football	Candidate in the 2017 Chilean general election
Rodolfo Moya	Football	Councilor of Concón (2016–2021)
Adolfo Nef	Football	Councilor of San Miguel (2008–2012); Candidate in the 2012 Chilean municipal election
Érika Olivera	Athletics (marathon)	Member of the Chamber of Deputies (2018–2026); Candidate in the 2025 Chilean general election
Juvenal Olmos	Football	Councilor of La Reina (2021)
Santiago Oñate	Football	Candidate in the 2016 Chilean municipal elections Candidate in the 2021 Chilean municipal elections
Mario Osbén	Football	Councilor of Chiguayante (2004–2008, 2012–2016)
Héctor Parra	Football	Consul of Chile in Buenos Aires, Argentina (1940s)
Caupolicán Peña	Football	Candidate in the 1965 Chilean parliamentary election Councilor of La Florida (2004–2008)
Jaime Pizarro	Football	Undersecretary of Sports (2007–2009); Minister of Sports (2023–2026)
Pablo Prieto	Football	Member of the Chamber of Deputies (2002–2006, 2018–2022); Candidate in the 2005 Chilean parliamentary election Member of the Regional Council of Maule (2014–2016); Candidate in the 2021 Chilean general election
Francisco Rojas	Football	Candidate in the 2021 Chilean municipal elections
Ricardo Rojas	Football	Councilor of La Serena (2013–2016)
Iona Rothfeld	Football (women's national team)	Candidate in the 2021 Chilean Constitutional Convention election
Arturo Salah	Football	Undersecretary of Sports (2001–2003)
José Salcedo	Football	Councilor of Los Ángeles (2021–2024)
Rubén Selman	Football	Candidate in the 2016 Chilean municipal elections
Eduardo Simián	Football	Candidate in the 1957 Chilean parliamentary election Minister of Mining (1964–1966)
Pablo Squella	Athletics (middle-distance running)	Minister of Sports (2016–2018)
José Sulantay	Football	Candidate in the 2012 Chilean municipal election
Marco Antonio Sulantay	Football	Candidate in the 2004 Chilean municipal election Director of Chiledeportes Coquimbo (2011–2014); Member of the Regional Council of Coquimbo (2018–2020); Candidate in the 2021 Chilean gubernatorial elections Member of the Chamber of Deputies (since 2021)
Leonardo Véliz	Football	Councilor of Santiago (2004–2008)
Eduardo Vilches	Football	Candidate in the 2024 Chilean municipal elections
Richard Zambrano	Football	Candidate in the 2012 Chilean municipal election
Marcelo Zunino	Football	Councilor of La Florida (2004–2016); Member of the Metropolitan Regional Council (since 2022)

=== Colombia ===
Name	Sport	Position
María Isabel Urrutia	Weightlifting	Minister of Sports (2022–2023); Representative for Valle del Cauca (2002–2010)

=== Ecuador ===
Name	Sport	Position
Abdalá Bucaram		President of Ecuador (1996–1997); Mayor of Guayaquil (1984–1985)
Abdalá Bucaram Jr.	Football	Congressman
Ulises de la Cruz	Football	Congressman
Agustín Delgado	Football	Congressman
Iván Hurtado	Football	Congressman

=== Guyana ===
Name	Sport	Position
Roy Fredericks	Cricket (Test)	Minister for Youth, Sport and Culture
Rupert Roopnaraine		

=== Paraguay ===
Name	Sport	Position
José Luis Chilavert		

=== Peru ===
Name	Sport	Position
Eduardo Dibós Chappuis	Auto racing	Mayor of Lima (1970–1973)
George Forsyth		
Gabriela Pérez del Solar	Volleyball	Congresswoman for Lima (2006–2011)
Cecilia Tait	Volleyball	Congresswoman for Lima (2000–2006, 2011–2016)
Cenaida Uribe	Volleyball	Congresswoman for Lima (2006–2016)

=== Suriname ===
Name	Sport	Position
Ronny Aloema		

=== Venezuela ===
Name	Sport	Position
Magglio Ordóñez		

== See also ==
- List of actor-politicians
- Politics and sport
