= Brian Charlton =

Canadian politician

The Honourable Brian Charlton ECO

Ontario MPP
- In office 1977–1995
- Preceded by: John Roxburgh Smith
- Succeeded by: Trevor Pettit
- Constituency: Hamilton Mountain

Personal details
- Born: Brian Albert Charlton; May 22, 1947 (age 79) Hamilton, Ontario, Canada
- Party: New Democrat
- Spouse: Chris Charlton
- Occupation: Non-profit executive

Brian Albert Charlton (born May 22, 1947) is a former politician in Ontario, Canada. He was a New Democratic member of the Legislative Assembly of Ontario from 1977 to 1995 who represented the riding of Hamilton Mountain. He served as a cabinet minister in the government of Bob Rae. He serves on the board of directors of a sustainable living non-profit called Green Venture.

== Background ==
Charlton worked as a property assessor before entering political life. His father, John Charlton, was a candidate for the Ontario NDP in the 1963 provincial election in the riding of Wentworth. His wife, Chris Charlton, campaigned for federal, provincial and municipal office numerous times from 1997, notably serving as NDP Member of Parliament for Hamilton Mountain from 2006 to 2015.

== Politics ==
=== In opposition ===
Charlton ran for the Ontario legislature in the provincial election of 1975, but lost to Progressive Conservative John Smith by 1,727 votes in Hamilton Mountain. He ran again in the 1977 provincial election, and defeated Smith by 373 votes.

In 1979, Charlton sponsored a private member's bill that would have given domestic workers the same protection as regular workers including a minimum wage of $3. At the time domestic workers were excluded form such protections as human rights, worker's compensation and minimum pay. The governing Tories killed the bill saying that many people could not afford to pay these workers such a high wage. In 1980, he proposed an affirmative action bill that would have promoted equal pay for women and other job protections. The bill was blocked by the Tories.

He was re-elected over Progressive Conservative Duncan Beattie in the 1981 provincial election by 197 votes. He was appointed as the party's environment critic. In 1982, Charlton proposed a bill called the Safe Drinking Water Act that would have protected water sources for human consumption. The bill was never passed but was a forerunner for legislation passed twenty years later in response to the Walkerton Inquiry. Charlton supported Bob Rae for the provincial NDP leadership in 1982.

He was re-elected by a greater margin in the 1985 provincial election, and defeated Liberal Jane Milanetti by 1,632 votes in the 1987 election. After the election he was appointed as the party's energy critic.

=== In government ===
The NDP won a majority government in the 1990 provincial election, and Charlton was re-elected by a landslide. After the election he was named as parliamentary assistant to the Minister of Energy, Jenny Carter.

He was appointed to cabinet on March 18, 1991, as Minister of Financial Institutions. He was also named Minister Responsible for Auto Insurance. He was named acting Minister of Energy on February 14, 1992, finally being appointed to the full portfolio on September 23 of the same year. Following a cabinet shuffle on February 3, 1993, he was named Chair of the Management Board of Cabinet as well as government House Leader.

After campaigning on a platform of publicly funded automobile insurance, the New Democrats backtracked due to the recession in the 1990s. Charlton took over management of the issue in 1991 and handled it through to the passing of Bill 164 in July 1993. The bill increased benefits for accident victims under the new no-fault system.

As Chair of the Management Board, Charlton faced a broad range of issues that concerned the public. However, one issue in particular raised a few eyebrows. In 1993 the government published a job advertisement for a management board director. The ad read that competition was limited to, "...aboriginal peoples, francophones, persons with disabilities, racial minorities and women." Many read this to mean that "white males" would be excluded and that this was a broad-minded government policy. Charlton said, "Most of the backlash was in fact the impression that all government jobs were going to be handled in that way, which wasn't correct." The government pulled the ad after the ensuing controversy.

In February 1995, Charlton suffered a heart attack and was hospitalized but returned to work three weeks later. He ran in the June 1995 provincial election but he finished third behind Liberal Marie Bountrogianni and the winner, Progressive Conservative Trevor Pettit.

=== Cabinet positions ===
Rae ministry, Province of Ontario (1990–1995)
Cabinet posts (3)
Predecessor	Office	Successor
Dave Cooke	Chair of the Management Board of Cabinet; 1993–1995	David Johnson
William Ferguson	Minister of Energy; 1992–1993	Bud Wildman
Peter Kormos	Minister of Financial Institutions; 1991–1993; Also Responsible for Auto Insurance	Position abolished

== Later life ==
After leaving office, Charlton worked as an executive assistant to Howard Hampton, the Ontario NDP leader who followed Bob Rae.

As of 2012, Charlton is the past chair of Green Venture, a non-profit group which focuses on sustainable living initiatives. and has chaired employment adjustment committees for the Hamilton Steelworkers Area Council and the Canadian Auto Workers.

== Electoral record ==
1977 Ontario general election: Hamilton Mountain
Party	Candidate	Votes	%	±%
New Democratic	Brian Charlton	12,681	38.26	+4.70
Progressive Conservative	John Roxburgh Smith	12,308	37.13	–1.67
Liberal	Kris Channan	7,910	23.86	–3.24
Communist	Mike Mirza	247	0.75	+0.21
Total valid votes		33,146	99.60	
Total rejected ballots		132	0.40	+0.08
Turnout		33,278	72.04	–0.54
Eligible voters		46,192		
New Democratic gain from Progressive Conservative		Swing		+3.19
Source: Elections Ontario

1981 Ontario general election: Hamilton Mountain
Party	Candidate	Votes	%	±%
New Democratic	Brian Charlton	11,008	35.77	–2.49
Progressive Conservative	Duncan Beattie	10,811	35.13	–2.00
Liberal	Vincent Agro	8,956	29.10	+5.24
Total valid votes		30,775	99.64	
Total rejected ballots		110	0.36	–0.04
Turnout		30,885	66.90	–5.15
Eligible voters		46,169		
New Democratic hold		Swing		–0.24
Source: Elections Ontario

1985 Ontario general election: Hamilton Mountain
Party	Candidate	Votes	%	±%
New Democratic	Brian Charlton	13,871	44.24	+8.47
Progressive Conservative	Steve Oneschuk	9,729	31.03	–4.10
Liberal	Dominic Agostino	7,757	24.74	–4.36
Total valid votes		31,357	99.60	
Total rejected ballots		127	0.40	+0.05
Turnout		31,484	69.21	+2.31
Eligible voters		45,491		
New Democratic hold		Swing		+6.28
Source: Elections Ontario

1987 Ontario general election: Hamilton Mountain
Party	Candidate	Votes	%	±%
New Democratic	Brian Charlton	14,743	42.82	–1.42
Liberal	Jane Milanetti	13,111	38.08	+13.34
Progressive Conservative	John Smith	6,580	19.11	–11.92
Total valid votes		34,434	99.75	
Total rejected ballots		85	0.25	–0.16
Turnout		34,519	65.87	–3.34
Eligible voters		52,408		
New Democratic hold		Swing		–7.38
Source: Elections Ontario

1990 Ontario general election: Hamilton Mountain
Party	Candidate	Votes	%	±%
New Democratic	Brian Charlton	22,488	59.76	+16.95
Progressive Conservative	Grant Darby	7,709	20.49	+1.38
Liberal	Al Bailey	7,432	19.75	–18.33
Total valid votes		37,629	98.61	
Total rejected, unmarked and declined ballots		529	1.39	+1.14
Turnout		38,158	66.55	+0.68
Eligible voters		57,337		
New Democratic hold		Swing		+7.78
Source: Elections Ontario

1995 Ontario general election: Hamilton Mountain
Party	Candidate	Votes	%	±%
Progressive Conservative	Trevor Pettit	13,852	36.60	+16.12
Liberal	Marie Bountrogianni	12,824	33.89	+14.14
New Democratic	Brian Charlton	9,837	25.99	–33.77
Family Coalition	Michael O'Grady	1,329	3.51	–
Total valid votes		37,842	98.96	
Total rejected, unmarked and declined ballots		399	1.04	–0.34
Turnout		38,241	64.41	–2.14
Eligible voters		59,371		
Progressive Conservative gain from New Democratic		Swing		+24.95
Source: Elections Ontario
