= Hamilton Mountain (provincial electoral district) =

Provincial electoral district in Ontario, Canada

Coordinates: 43.212°N 79.862°W

Ontario electoral district
- Hamilton Mountain in relation to the other Hamilton ridings

Provincial electoral district
- Legislature: Legislative Assembly of Ontario
MPP
Monica Ciriello
Progressive Conservative
- District created: 1976
- First contested: 1967
- Last contested: 2025

Demographics
- Population (2016): 104,875
- Electors (2018): 80,578
- Area (km²): 33
- Pop. density (per km²): 3,178
- Census division: Hamilton
- Census subdivision: Hamilton

Hamilton Mountain is a provincial electoral district in Ontario, Canada, that has been represented in the Legislative Assembly of Ontario since 1967. The riding is located in the Hamilton region.

The socio-economic composition of the Hamilton Mountain is diverse, having low-income public housing residents and million-dollar estates, highly paid unionized workers and small-wage unskilled workers, and well-established families and recent immigrants.

== Geography ==
In 2003, the riding was redefined to consist of the part of the City of Hamilton bounded by a line drawn west from the Niagara Escarpment along Red Hill Creek, south along Mountain Brow Boulevard, Arbour Road and Glover Road, west along the hydroelectric transmission line situated south of Rymal Road East, north along Glancaster Road, east along Garner Road East, north along the hydroelectric transmission line situated west of Upper Paradise Road, east along Lincoln M. Alexander Parkway, north along West 5th Street, northeast along James Mountain Road, and east and south along the Niagara Escarpment to the point of commencement.

== History ==
Provincially, this riding has been held by every major Ontario political party having at least one time. The current NDP Member of Provincial Parliament, Monique Taylor, defeated Liberal Cabinet Minister, Sophia Aggelonitis in 2011.

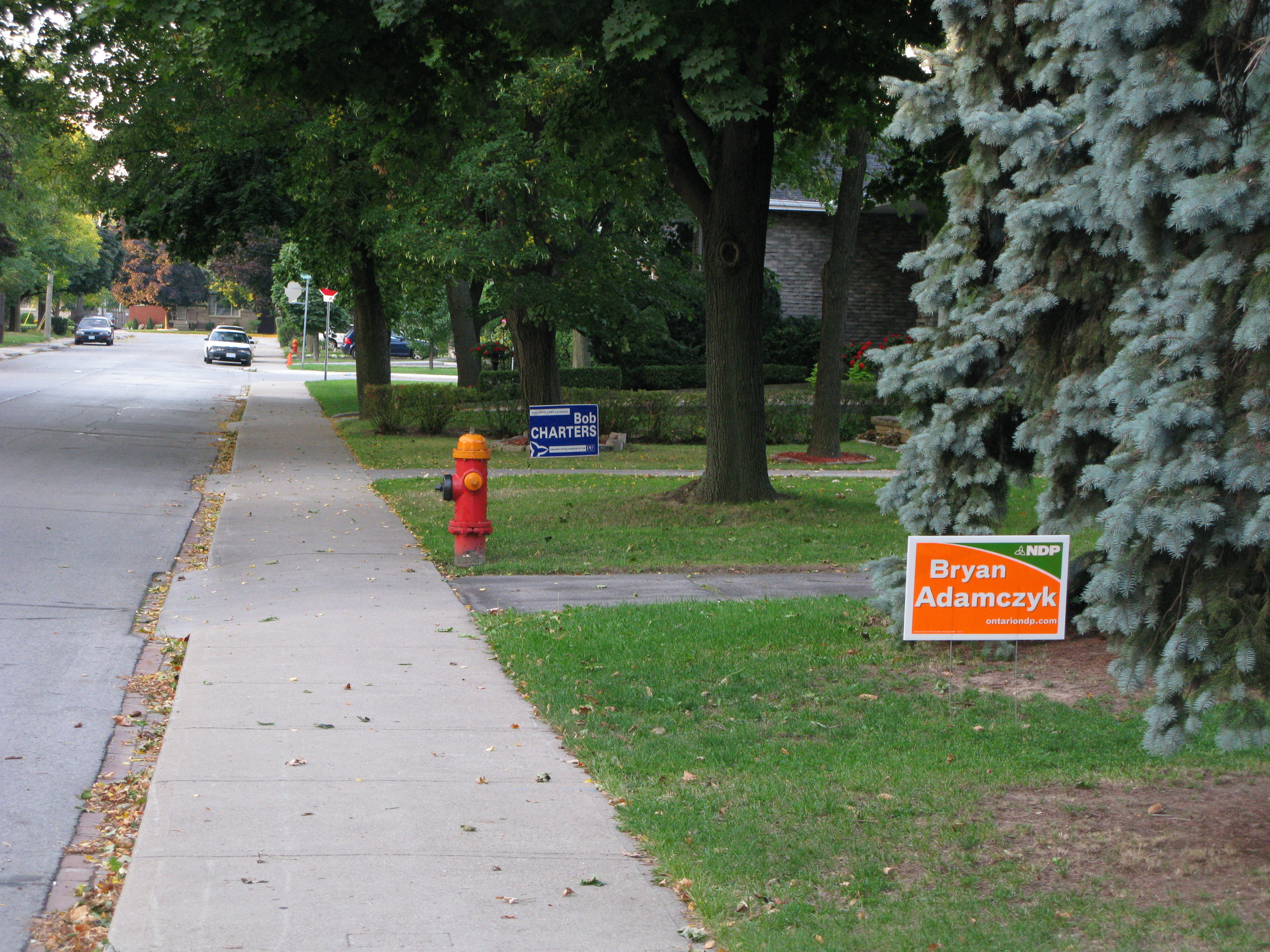
Lawn signs for Hamilton Mountain candidates in 2007 election

== Members of Provincial Parliament ==
This riding has elected the following members of the Legislative Assembly of Ontario:

Hamilton Mountain
Assembly	Years	Member	Party
Riding created from Wentworth in 1967
28th	1967–1971	John Roxburgh Smith	Progressive Conservative
29th	1971–1975	John Roxburgh Smith	Progressive Conservative
30th	1975–1977	John Roxburgh Smith	Progressive Conservative
31st	1977–1981	Brian Charlton	New Democratic
32nd	1981–1985	Brian Charlton	New Democratic
33rd	1985–1987	Brian Charlton	New Democratic
34th	1987–1990	Brian Charlton	New Democratic
35th	1990–1995	Brian Charlton	New Democratic
36th	1995–1999	Trevor Pettit	Progressive Conservative
37th	1999–2003	Marie Bountrogianni	Liberal
38th	2003–2007	Marie Bountrogianni	Liberal
39th	2007–2011	Sophia Aggelonitis	Liberal
40th	2011–2014	Monique Taylor	New Democratic
41st	2014–2018	Monique Taylor	New Democratic
42nd	2018–2022	Monique Taylor	New Democratic
43rd	2022–2025	Monique Taylor	New Democratic
44th	2025–present	Monica Ciriello	Progressive Conservative

== Election results ==
Winning party in each polling division of Hamilton Mountain at the 2025 Ontario general election

2025 Ontario general election
Party	Candidate	Votes	%	±%	Expenditures
Progressive Conservative	Monica Ciriello	13,948	36.16	+6.15	$75,486
Liberal	Dawn Danko	11,933	30.93	+15.36	$57,529
New Democratic	Kojo Damptey	10,037	26.02	–18.79	$62,639
Green	Joshua Czerniga	1,544	4.00	–1.62	$525
New Blue	Layla Marie-Angela Protopapa	392	1.02	–1.25	$0
None of the Above	Dan Preston	278	0.72	–	$0
Independent	Ejaz Butt	267	0.69	–	$2,191
Ontario Party	Bing Wong	178	0.46	–1.27	$565
Total valid votes		38,577	99.42	–	$135,739
Total rejected, unmarked and declined ballots		225	0.58	–0.00	
Turnout		38,802	46.02	+4.54	
Eligible voters		84,310			
Progressive Conservative gain from New Democratic		Swing		+12.47	
Source: Elections Ontario

Winning party in each polling division of Hamilton Mountain at the 2022 Ontario general election

2022 Ontario general election
Party	Candidate	Votes	%	±%	Expenditures
New Democratic	Monique Taylor	15,250	44.81	–9.77	$75,864
Progressive Conservative	Mike Spadafora	10,211	30.00	+1.17	$27,375
Liberal	Chantale Lachance	5,300	15.57	+6.33	$10,000
Green	Janet Errygers	1,913	5.62	+0.48	$559
New Blue	Baylee Nguyen	770	2.26	–	$0
Ontario Party	Andy Busa	590	1.73	–	none listed
Total valid votes		34,034	99.42		
Total rejected, unmarked and declined ballots		200	0.58	–0.60	
Turnout		34,234	41.49	–14.68	
Eligible voters		82,518			
New Democratic hold		Swing		–5.47	
Source: Elections Ontario

2018 Ontario general election
Party	Candidate	Votes	%	±%	Expenditures
New Democratic	Monique Taylor	24,406	54.58	+5.97	$60,699
Progressive Conservative	Esther Pauls	12,891	28.83	+11.27	$47,227
Liberal	Damin Starr	4,134	9.24	–18.82	$28,018
Green	Dave Urquhart	2,300	5.14	+0.81	$39
Libertarian	Kristofer Maves	533	1.19	–	none listed
None of the Above	Scott Patrick Miller	453	1.01	–	$0
Total valid votes		44,717	98.81		
Total rejected, unmarked and declined ballots		538	1.19		
Turnout		45,255	56.16		
Eligible voters		80,578			
New Democratic hold		Swing		–2.65	
Source: Elections Ontario

2014 general election redistributed results
Party	Vote	%
New Democratic	19,649	48.61
Liberal	11,343	28.06
Progressive Conservative	7,099	17.56
Green	1,750	4.33
Others	585	1.45

2014 Ontario general election
Party	Candidate	Votes	%	±%
New Democratic	Monique Taylor	23,006	46.90	+1.73
Liberal	Javid Mirza	14,508	29.57	–2.81
Progressive Conservative	Albert Marshall	8,795	17.93	–1.12
Green	Greg Lenko	2,047	4.17	+2.52
Libertarian	Hans Wienhold	379	0.77	+0.28
Freedom	Brian Goodwin	320	0.65	+0.37
Total valid votes		49,055	98.38	
Total rejected, unmarked and declined ballots		810	1.62	+1.17
Turnout		49,865	52.85	+2.40
Eligible voters		94,360		
New Democratic hold		Swing		+2.27
Source: Elections Ontario

2011 Ontario general election
Party	Candidate	Votes	%	±%
New Democratic	Monique Taylor	20,492	45.16	+11.64
Liberal	Sophia Aggelonitis	14,694	32.38	–4.86
Progressive Conservative	Geordie Elms	8,641	19.04	–4.48
Green	Tony Morris	748	1.65	–3.00
Family Coalition	Jim Enos	450	0.99	–0.06
Libertarian	Hans Wienhold	222	0.49	–
Freedom	Brian Goodwin	126	0.28	–
Total valid votes		45,373	99.54	
Total rejected, unmarked and declined ballots		208	0.46	–0.33
Turnout		45,581	50.45	–2.89
Eligible voters		90,355		
New Democratic gain from Liberal		Swing		+8.25
Source: Elections Ontario

2007 Ontario general election
Party	Candidate	Votes	%	±%
Liberal	Sophia Aggelonitis	17,387	37.24	–14.55
New Democratic	Bryan Adamczyk	15,653	33.53	+7.07
Progressive Conservative	Bob Charters	10,982	23.52	+4.51
Green	Ivan Miletic	2,172	4.65	+3.56
Family Coalition	Mary Maan	493	1.06	–0.59
Total valid votes		46,687	99.22	
Total rejected, unmarked and declined ballots		368	0.78	+0.10
Turnout		47,055	53.33	–5.63
Eligible voters		88,231		
Liberal hold		Swing		–10.81
Source: Elections Ontario

2003 Ontario general election
Party	Candidate	Votes	%	±%
Liberal	Marie Bountrogianni	23,524	51.79	+11.54
New Democratic	Chris Charlton	12,017	26.46	+4.05
Progressive Conservative	Shakil Hassan	8,637	19.02	–15.58
Family Coalition	Eleanor Johnson	748	1.65	+0.75
Green	Selwyn Inniss	494	1.09	+0.13
Total valid votes		45,420	99.32	
Total rejected, unmarked and declined ballots		310	0.68	–0.27
Turnout		45,730	58.96	–3.06
Eligible voters		77,565		
Liberal hold		Swing		+3.75
Source: Elections Ontario

1999 Ontario general election
Party	Candidate	Votes	%	±%
Liberal	Marie Bountrogianni	19,076	40.25	+6.36
Progressive Conservative	Trevor Pettit	16,397	34.60	–2.01
New Democratic	Chris Charlton	10,622	22.41	–3.58
Green	Kelli Gallagher	456	0.96	–
Family Coalition	Jim Enos	426	0.90	–2.61
Natural Law	Bob Danio	261	0.55	–
Independent	Rolf V. Gerstenberger	159	0.34	–
Total valid votes		47,397	99.05	
Total rejected, unmarked and declined ballots		455	0.95	–0.09
Turnout		47,852	62.02	–2.39
Eligible voters		77,159		
Liberal gain from Progressive Conservative		Swing		+4.18
Source: Elections Ontario

1995 Ontario general election
Party	Candidate	Votes	%	±%
Progressive Conservative	Trevor Pettit	13,852	36.60	+16.12
Liberal	Marie Bountrogianni	12,824	33.89	+14.14
New Democratic	Brian Charlton	9,837	25.99	–33.77
Family Coalition	Michael O'Grady	1,329	3.51	–
Total valid votes		37,842	98.96	
Total rejected, unmarked and declined ballots		399	1.04	–0.34
Turnout		38,241	64.41	–2.14
Eligible voters		59,371		
Progressive Conservative gain from New Democratic		Swing		+24.95
Source: Elections Ontario

1990 Ontario general election
Party	Candidate	Votes	%	±%
New Democratic	Brian Charlton	22,488	59.76	+16.95
Progressive Conservative	Grant Darby	7,709	20.49	+1.38
Liberal	Al Bailey	7,432	19.75	–18.33
Total valid votes		37,629	98.61	
Total rejected, unmarked and declined ballots		529	1.39	+1.14
Turnout		38,158	66.55	+0.68
Eligible voters		57,337		
New Democratic hold		Swing		+7.78
Source: Elections Ontario

1987 Ontario general election
Party	Candidate	Votes	%	±%
New Democratic	Brian Charlton	14,743	42.82	–1.42
Liberal	Jane Milanetti	13,111	38.08	+13.34
Progressive Conservative	John Smith	6,580	19.11	–11.92
Total valid votes		34,434	99.75	
Total rejected ballots		85	0.25	–0.16
Turnout		34,519	65.87	–3.34
Eligible voters		52,408		
New Democratic hold		Swing		–7.38
Source: Elections Ontario

1985 Ontario general election
Party	Candidate	Votes	%	±%
New Democratic	Brian Charlton	13,871	44.24	+8.47
Progressive Conservative	Steve Oneschuk	9,729	31.03	–4.10
Liberal	Dominic Agostino	7,757	24.74	–4.36
Total valid votes		31,357	99.60	
Total rejected ballots		127	0.40	+0.05
Turnout		31,484	69.21	+2.31
Eligible voters		45,491		
New Democratic hold		Swing		+6.28
Source: Elections Ontario

1981 Ontario general election
Party	Candidate	Votes	%	±%
New Democratic	Brian Charlton	11,008	35.77	–2.49
Progressive Conservative	Duncan Beattie	10,811	35.13	–2.00
Liberal	Vincent Agro	8,956	29.10	+5.24
Total valid votes		30,775	99.64	
Total rejected ballots		110	0.36	–0.04
Turnout		30,885	66.90	–5.15
Eligible voters		46,169		
New Democratic hold		Swing		–0.24
Source: Elections Ontario

1977 Ontario general election
Party	Candidate	Votes	%	±%
New Democratic	Brian Charlton	12,681	38.26	+4.70
Progressive Conservative	John Roxburgh Smith	12,308	37.13	–1.67
Liberal	Kris Channan	7,910	23.86	–3.24
Communist	Mike Mirza	247	0.75	+0.21
Total valid votes		33,146	99.60	
Total rejected ballots		132	0.40	+0.08
Turnout		33,278	72.04	–0.54
Eligible voters		46,192		
New Democratic gain from Progressive Conservative		Swing		+3.19
Source: Elections Ontario

1975 Ontario general election
Party	Candidate	Votes	%	±%
Progressive Conservative	John Roxburgh Smith	12,769	38.80	–11.48
New Democratic	Brian Charlton	11,042	33.55	+3.56
Liberal	Raymond Clare Edwards	8,921	27.11	+7.38
Communist	Mike Mirza	177	0.54	–
Total valid votes		32,909	99.68	
Total rejected ballots		106	0.32	+0.00
Turnout		33,015	72.58	–5.55
Eligible voters		45,488		
Progressive Conservative hold		Swing		–7.52
Source: Elections Ontario

1971 Ontario general election
Party	Candidate	Votes	%	±%
Progressive Conservative	John Roxburgh Smith	17,979	50.28	+5.68
New Democratic	Don Eastman	10,725	29.99	–10.62
Liberal	Joe McLaren	7,053	19.72	+5.55
Total valid votes		35,757	99.68	
Total rejected ballots		115	0.32	–0.19
Turnout		35,872	78.13	+10.15
Eligible voters		45,912		
Progressive Conservative hold		Swing		+8.15
Source: Elections Ontario

1967 Ontario general election
Party	Candidate	Votes	%
Progressive Conservative	John Roxburgh Smith	12,105	44.60
New Democratic	John Lawrence Dowling	11,022	40.61
Liberal	James Graham	3,846	14.17
Communist	William Stewart	166	0.61
Total valid votes		27,139	99.49
Total rejected ballots		138	0.51
Turnout		27,277	67.98
Eligible voters		40,126	
Progressive Conservative pickup new district.			
Source: Elections Ontario

== 2007 electoral reform referendum ==
2007 Ontario electoral reform referendum
Side	Votes	%
First Past the Post	29,343	65
Mixed member proportional	15,822	35
Total valid votes	45,165	100
Sourced from Elections Ontario.

== See also ==
- List of Ontario provincial electoral districts
- Canadian provincial electoral districts

== Sources ==
- Elections Ontario Past Election Results
- Map of riding for 2018 election
- Legislative Assembly of Ontario entry for Brian Charlton
- Legislative Assembly of Ontario entry for Marie Bountrogianni
