= Monica Ciriello =

Canadian politician

Monica Ciriello MPP
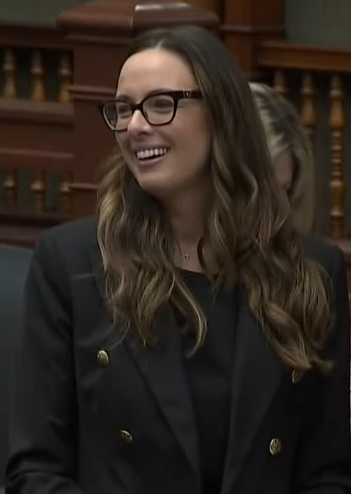
- Ciriello in 2025

Member of the Ontario Provincial Parliament for Hamilton Mountain
- Incumbent
- Assumed office February 27, 2025
- Preceded by: Monique Taylor

Personal details
- Born: 1988 or 1989 (age 37–38) London, Ontario
- Party: Progressive Conservative
- Other political affiliations: Conservative Party of Canada
- Education: Western University (BA); University of Windsor (MA); University of Michigan (MPP); University of Detroit Mercy (JD
- Profession: Lawyer

Monica Ciriello MPP is a Canadian politician, currently serving as the MPP for Hamilton Mountain in the Legislative Assembly of Ontario. She was elected in the 2025 Ontario general election as a member of the Progressive Conservative Party.

== Early life, education and early career ==
Ciriello was born in London, Ontario. Her father, John Ciriello, was a professor in the Department of Physiology and Pharmacology at Western University.

Ciriello earned a BA in Political Science from Western and a MA in the same field from the University of Windsor and a Masters in Public Policy from the University of Michigan. During her studies, Ciriello was active with campus Conservative organizations.

While studying law in the United States, Ciriello met her future husband, Greg Witt. Ciriello credits her spouse with inspiring her to focus on municipal planning law.

Before entering provincial politics, Ciriello practiced municipal and planning law in both the public and private sectors. After returning to Canada, Ciriello worked as a solicitor for the City of Windsor. She then served as the Assistant County Solicitor with Middlesex County before joining Aird & Berlis LLP in Toronto as an associate. At Aird & Berlis, she represented private developers and municipalities on land-use and planning law matters. In 2019, Ciriello joined the City of Hamilton as Director of Municipal Law and Licencing where she oversaw regulatory policy, municipal policy reform, by-law enforcement and the administration of municipal tribunals.

In 2021, Ciriello was appointed as an adjudicator of Ontario's Criminal Injuries Compensation Board, serving until the end of that year. In January 2022, she was appointed as a Vice-chair of the Licence Appeal Tribunal, where she adjudicated matters including automobile accident benefits and regulatory appeals. She remained Vice-chair until resigning in March 2025 following her election to the Legislative Assembly of Ontario.

Ciriello is an author on municipal law and public policy, authoring columns the International Municipal Lawyers Association. Ciriello has also previously worked with the conservative think-tank, the Macdonald-Laurier Institute, and participated in podcasts and as an author for the local affairs magazine Municipal World.

Ciriello has also served on the advisory board of McMaster University's Master of Public Policy Program.

== Political career ==
Ciriello stood as the Conservative Party's candidate in Hamilton Centre in 2019. During the campaign, Ciriello campaigned against federal carbon pricing and gun control, and as "pro-pipeline" and tough-on-crime. Ciriello was critiqued during the campaign for living outside of the riding. She placed third with just over 14% of the vote.

Ciriello was named as the Ontario Progressive Conservative candidate on Hamilton Mountain just prior to the snap 2025 provincial election. Like most Ontario PC candidates, Ciriello did not participate in local debates during the campaign. Her campaign told the Hamilton Spectator that she was not aware of the all-candidates debate hosted by local media.

On election night, Ciriello captured just over 36% of the vote, beating her nearest rival, school trustee Dawn Danko of the Ontario Liberals by 2,000 votes. In winning, Ciriello became the first PC candidate to win the seat since Trevor Pettit, who held it from 1995 to 1999 during the government of Mike Harris.

In 2025 she was appointed as the Parliamentary Assistant to the Attorney General by Doug Ford.

In 2026, Ciriello introduced a private member's motion calling on the Ontario government to modernize and strengthen the provinces restraining order system, particularly in relation to victims of intimate partner and family violence. The motion was unanimously adopted by the Legislative Assembly, with 109 members voting in favour and none opposed.

Ciriello and Perth-Welling MPP Matthew Rae served as co-chairs of the 2026 Progressive Conservative Party of Ontario convention.

== Electoral history ==
2025 Ontario general election: Hamilton Mountain
Party	Candidate	Votes	%	±%	Expenditures
Progressive Conservative	Monica Ciriello	13,948	36.16	+6.16	$75,486
Liberal	Dawn Danko	11,933	30.93	+15.36	$57,529
New Democratic	Kojo Damptey	10,037	26.02	–18.79	$62,639
Green	Joshua Czerniga	1,544	4.00	–1.62	$525
New Blue	Layla Marie-Angela Protopapa	392	1.02	–1.25	$0
None of the Above	Dan Preston	278	0.72	N/A	$0
Independent	Ejaz Butt	267	0.69	N/A	$2,191
Ontario Party	Bing Wong	178	0.46	–1.27	$565
Total valid votes/expense limit		38,578	99.42	±0.0	$135,739
Total rejected, unmarked, and declined ballots		225	0.58	±0.0	
Turnout		38,803	46.14	+4.65	
Eligible voters		84,106			
Progressive Conservative gain from New Democratic		Swing		−4.60	
Source: Elections Ontario

2019 Canadian federal election: Hamilton Centre
Party	Candidate	Votes	%	±%	Expenditures
New Democratic	Matthew Green	20,368	46.16	+0.60	$71,015.33
Liberal	Jasper Kujavsky	12,651	28.67	-4.72	$79,469.65
Conservative	Monica Ciriello	6,341	14.37	-0.28	$13,186.90
Green	Jason Lopez	3,370	7.64	+3.31	none listed
People's	Melina Mamone	833	1.89	–	none listed
Christian Heritage	Gary Duyzer	182	0.41	–	none listed
Independent	Tony Lemma	158	0.36	–	$2,716.24
Independent	Edward Graydon	134	0.30	–	none listed
Independent	Nathalie Xian Yi Yan	85	0.19	–	none listed
Total valid votes/expense limit		44,122	99.09		
Total rejected ballots		405	0.91	+0.26	
Turnout		44,527	59.08	-0.34	
Eligible voters		75,371			
New Democratic hold		Swing		+2.66	
Source: Elections Canada
