= Monique Taylor =

Canadian politician

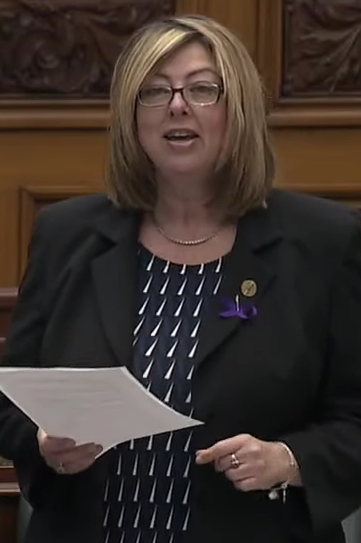
- Taylor in May 2019

Deputy Whip of the Ontario New Democratic Party
- In office February 1, 2021 – January 28, 2025 Serving with Michael Mantha
- Leader: Peter Tabuns (interim); Marit Stiles

Critic, Children and Youth Services
- In office August 23, 2018 – January 28, 2025
- Leader: Andrea Horwath; Peter Tabuns (interim); Marit Stiles

Member of Provincial Parliament for Hamilton Mountain
- In office October 6, 2011 – January 28, 2025
- Preceded by: Sophia Aggelonitis
- Succeeded by: Monica Ciriello

Personal details
- Born: June 28, 1972 (age 54) Hamilton, Ontario, Canada
- Party: Ontario New Democratic (provincial); New Democratic (federal)
- Children: 1
- Occupation: Politician

Monique Taylor (born June 28, 1972) is a Canadian politician in Ontario, Canada. She was a New Democratic member of the Legislative Assembly of Ontario who represented the riding of Hamilton Mountain. She was an MPP from 2011 to 2025. During her time in Parliament, she served as the NDP's critic for Children and Youth Services and critic for Mental Health and Addictions. She also served as Deputy Opposition Whip from February 1, 2021 until she stepped down on January 28, 2025.

== Background ==
Taylor was born in the east end of Hamilton and grew up in the city. She has worked as a waitress and most recently as an administrative assistant to Hamilton City Councillor Scott Duvall.

== Political career ==
In 2011, she ran as the New Democrat candidate in the riding of Hamilton Mountain. She beat Liberal incumbent Sophia Aggelonitis by 5,798 votes. She was re-elected in the 2014 provincial election defeating Liberal candidate Javid Mirza by 8,483 votes.

In 2012, she introduced a private member's bill that would have extended Ontario ombudsman's oversight to Children Aid Societies. The bill made it to second reading but the bill died when Premier Dalton McGuinty prorogued the house in September 2012.

In May 2016, Taylor was ejected from the legislature for repeatedly refusing the Speaker's requests to stop yelling while debating a new Ontario Autism Program with $333 million in funding, but which would move kids with autism older than five to a longer but less intensive therapy program and compensate their families with $8000 for being taken off the intensive therapy waitlist.

In spring 2018, news reports surfaced that two human rights complaints were filed against Taylor by staffers in March 2018. One human rights complaint alleges Taylor attempted to force and coerce one of her assistants to accuse another coworker of sexual harassment to erroneously produce grounds for the employee's termination. The other complaint details MPP Taylor bullying and discriminating against her staff. The complaints were subsequently resolved in December of the same year.

In February 2019, Taylor was ejected from the legislature after refusing to withdraw a remark where she accused the Progressive Conservative government led by Premier Doug Ford of lying to Ontario families about the autism waitlist.

In April 2022, she co-sponsored a bill put forward by MPP Bill Walker that would declare each June in Ontario myasthenia gravis month.

In March 2023, she introduced Bill-74, Missing Persons Amendment Act, 2023. The bill would expand the scope of people the Ontario Provincial Police could issue amber alerts for to encompass "vulnerable persons," defined as persons who have a greater dependency on others because of their age, disability or other circumstances.

In 2024, she announced her intention to seek the federal NDP nomination for Hamilton Mountain. In April 2025, Taylor lost to incumbent Liberal Member of Parliament Lisa Hepfner, who was elected to a second term as MP for Hamilton Mountain.

In 2026, Taylor endorsed Rob Ashton in that year's federal NDP leadership race. She was the Ontario NDP candidate in the 2026 Hamilton East—Stoney Creek provincial by-election, placing second behind PC candidate Jeff Beattie.

== Electoral record ==
Ontario provincial by-election, September 3, 2026: Hamilton East—Stoney Creek
Party	Candidate	Votes	%	±%
Progressive Conservative	Jeff Beattie	10,500	38.87	–3.20
New Democratic	Monique Taylor	8,886	32.90	+15.30
Liberal	Heino Doessing	6,334	23.45	–8.16
Green	Pascale Marchand	719	2.66	–2.59
New Blue	Wieslawa Derlatka	318	1.18	–0.18
Ontario Party	Heather Curnew	254	0.94	–0.59
Total valid votes		27,011	99.47	+0.16
Total rejected, unmarked, and declined ballots		144	0.53	-0.16
Turnout		27,155	29.40	-14.42
Eligible voters		92,355		
Progressive Conservative hold		Swing		-9.25
Source: Elections Ontario

2025 Canadian federal election: Hamilton Mountain
Party	Candidate	Votes	%	±%	Expenditures
Liberal	Lisa Hepfner	27,302	45.58	+11.08	$116,114.05
Conservative	Ken Hewitt	24,857	41.50	+16.45	$111,337.71
New Democratic	Monique Taylor	7,044	11.76	–19.80	$128,674.81
People's	Bing Wong	497	0.83	–5.49	$1,815.37
Marxist–Leninist	Rolf Gerstenberger	193	0.32	N/A	$4,180.00
Total valid votes/expense limit		59,893	99.12	—	$134,434.84
Total rejected ballots		529	0.88		
Turnout		60,422	68.21	+7.71	
Eligible voters		88,577			
Liberal notional hold		Swing		–2.81	
Source: Elections Canada

2022 Ontario general election: Hamilton Mountain
Party	Candidate	Votes	%	±%	Expenditures
New Democratic	Monique Taylor	15,250	44.81	–9.77	$75,864
Progressive Conservative	Mike Spadafora	10,211	30.00	+1.17	$27,375
Liberal	Chantale Lachance	5,300	15.57	+6.33	$10,000
Green	Janet Errygers	1,913	5.62	+0.48	$559
New Blue	Baylee Nguyen	770	2.26	–	$0
Ontario Party	Andy Busa	590	1.73	–	none listed
Total valid votes		34,034	99.42		
Total rejected, unmarked and declined ballots		200	0.58	–0.60	
Turnout		34,234	41.49	–14.68	
Eligible voters		82,518			
New Democratic hold		Swing		–5.47	
Source: Elections Ontario

2018 Ontario general election: Hamilton Mountain
Party	Candidate	Votes	%	±%	Expenditures
New Democratic	Monique Taylor	24,406	54.58	+5.97	$60,699
Progressive Conservative	Esther Pauls	12,891	28.83	+11.27	$47,227
Liberal	Damin Starr	4,134	9.24	–18.82	$28,018
Green	Dave Urquhart	2,300	5.14	+0.81	$39
Libertarian	Kristofer Maves	533	1.19	–	none listed
None of the Above	Scott Patrick Miller	453	1.01	–	$0
Total valid votes		44,717	98.81		
Total rejected, unmarked and declined ballots		538	1.19		
Turnout		45,255	56.16		
Eligible voters		80,578			
New Democratic hold		Swing		–2.65	
Source: Elections Ontario

2014 Ontario general election: Hamilton Mountain
Party	Candidate	Votes	%	±%
New Democratic	Monique Taylor	23,006	46.90	+1.73
Liberal	Javid Mirza	14,508	29.57	–2.81
Progressive Conservative	Albert Marshall	8,795	17.93	–1.12
Green	Greg Lenko	2,047	4.17	+2.52
Libertarian	Hans Wienhold	379	0.77	+0.28
Freedom	Brian Goodwin	320	0.65	+0.37
Total valid votes		49,055	98.38	
Total rejected, unmarked and declined ballots		810	1.62	+1.17
Turnout		49,865	52.85	+2.40
Eligible voters		94,360		
New Democratic hold		Swing		+2.27
Source: Elections Ontario

2011 Ontario general election: Hamilton Mountain
Party	Candidate	Votes	%	±%
New Democratic	Monique Taylor	20,492	45.16	+11.64
Liberal	Sophia Aggelonitis	14,694	32.38	–4.86
Progressive Conservative	Geordie Elms	8,641	19.04	–4.48
Green	Tony Morris	748	1.65	–3.00
Family Coalition	Jim Enos	450	0.99	–0.06
Libertarian	Hans Wienhold	222	0.49	–
Freedom	Brian Goodwin	126	0.28	–
Total valid votes		45,373	99.54	
Total rejected, unmarked and declined ballots		208	0.46	–0.33
Turnout		45,581	50.45	–2.89
Eligible voters		90,355		
New Democratic gain from Liberal		Swing		+8.25
Source: Elections Ontario
