= Gus MacFarlane =

Canadian politician, coach, and administrator (1925–1991)

Member of the Canadian Parliament for Hamilton Mountain
- In office 1974–1979
- Preceded by: Duncan Beattie
- Succeeded by: Duncan Beattie

Personal details
- Born: February 19, 1925 Montreal, Quebec, Canada
- Died: February 22, 1991 (aged 66) Charlottetown, Prince Edward Island, Canada
- Party: Liberal
- Education: McGill University
- Coaching career

Coaching career (HC unless noted)

Football
- 1950: Verdun Pats
- 1951–1952: Verdun Shamcats
- 1953–1956: Verdun HS (PQ)
- 1957–1970: Mount Allison

Administrative career (AD unless noted)
- 1963–1971: Mount Allison

Angus "Gus" MacFarlane (February 19, 1925 – February 22, 1991) was a Canadian politician the Liberal MP for Hamilton Mountain from 1974 to 1979. He served as Chief Government Whip from 1977 to 1978. Prior to entering politics, MacFarlane was a coach and administrator, most notably at Mount Allison University.

== Early life ==
MacFarlane was born in Montreal, Quebec on February 19, 1925 to Scottish immigrants Duncan and Katherine (McChristies) MacFarlane. He served as a flying officer in the Royal Canadian Air Force during World War II. He graduated from McGill University and worked as a teacher in Verdun, Quebec from 1950 to 1957.

== Athletics ==
In 1950, MacFarlane led the Verdun Pats to Quebec Rugby Football Union junior title. The following season, five of Verdun's junior teams merged to form the Verdun Shamcats and MacFarlane was chosen to serve as coach of the new team. He left the Shamcats in 1953 to become a teacher and coach at Verdun High School.

In 1957, MacFarlane became the head football and basketball coach at Mount Allison University in Sackville, New Brunswick. He recruited a number of football players from Montreal. His teams were competitive despited the school's small size. One of his players, Rick Black, was the first player from a Maritime university to be selected in the Canadian college draft. In 1963, he became the school's director of physical education and athletics. In 1969, he was named manager of the Canada men's national basketball team. He resigned both jobs in 1971 to become the resource assistant at the Administrative Center for Sport and Recreation in Ottawa. In this role, MacFarlane assisted amateur sports organizations with fundraising.

== Politics ==
From 1968 to 1970, MacFarlane was president of the Westmorland—Kent Liberal Association. In 1972, he moved to Hamilton, Ontario to become the dean of men at McMaster University. He became involved with the Liberal Party in that city and served on the Hamilton Liberal Association's policy committee.

In 1974, MacFarlane ran for the House of Commons of Canada in the Hamilton Mountain riding. He beat Progressive Conservative incumbent Duncan Beattie 22,253 votes to 17,922. On January 21, 1977, he was appointed chief government whip in the House of Commons by Prime Minister Pierre Trudeau. He was replaced by Cliff McIsaac in October 1978 and reassisgned to the role of parliamentary secretary to Minister of State (Federal-Provincial Relations) Marc Lalonde.

MacFarlane was defeated for reelection to the House of Commons in 1979, losing to Beattie 21,348 votes to 17,334. He ran again in the 1980 Canadian federal election and finished third behind NDP candidate Ian Deans and Beattie.

== Later life ==
In 1980, MacFarlane was appointed to the War Veterans Allowance Board. He spent his later years working with the Department of Veterans Affairs in Charlottetown. He died there on February 22, 1991.
