= Gordon Sullivan =

Gordon Sullivan may refer to:

- Gordon R. Sullivan (born 1937), U.S. general
- Gordon J. Sullivan (born 1920), Canadian politician, 28th Canadian Parliament
