= William Dean Howe =

Canadian politician

- Official 1966 portrait

Member of Parliament for Hamilton South
- In office April 1963 – June 1968

Personal details
- Born: 12 January 1916 Toronto, Ontario, Canada
- Died: 24 June 1982 (aged 66)
- Party: New Democratic
- Profession: physician

William Dean Howe (12 January 1916 – 24 June 1982) was a New Democratic Party member of the House of Commons of Canada. He was born in Toronto, Ontario and became a physician by career.

Howe was first elected at the Hamilton South riding in the 1963 general election, after an unsuccessful attempt to win a seat there in the 1962 election. After re-election to a second term at Hamilton South in the 1965 election, riding changes by the 1968 election meant that Howe campaigned in the Hamilton Mountain riding. He was defeated in the 1968 federal election by Gordon J. Sullivan of the Liberal Party and did not stand for election again.
