= Hamilton South (electoral district) =

Former federal electoral district in Ontario, Canada

Ontario electoral district

Defunct federal electoral district
- Legislature: House of Commons
- District created: 1952
- District abolished: 1966
- First contested: 1953
- Last contested: 1965

Hamilton South was a federal electoral district represented in the House of Commons of Canada from 1953 to 1965. It was located in the province of Ontario. This riding was created in 1952, from parts of Hamilton East, Hamilton West and Wentworth ridings.

It consisted of the part of the city of Hamilton lying east of Ottawa Street, the brow of the mountain, the part of the city south of the brow and west of Ottawa Street.

The electoral district was abolished in 1966 when it was redistributed between Hamilton East, Hamilton Mountain, Hamilton—Wentworth and ridings.

== Members of Parliament ==
This riding elected the following members of the House of Commons:

Parliament	Years	Member	Party
Riding created from Hamilton East, Hamilton West and Wentworth
22nd	1953–1957	Russell Reinke	Liberal
23rd	1957–1958	Bob McDonald	Progressive Conservative
24th	1958–1962	Bob McDonald	Progressive Conservative
25th	1962–1963	Bob McDonald	Progressive Conservative
26th	1963–1965	William Dean Howe	New Democratic
27th	1965–1968	William Dean Howe	New Democratic
Riding dissolved into Hamilton East, Hamilton Mountain and Hamilton—Wentworth

== Election results ==
1953 Canadian federal election
Party	Candidate	Votes
Liberal	Russell Reinke	12,296
Progressive Conservative	Edward Charles David Crockett	9,220
Co-operative Commonwealth	Joseph Lees Easton	7,478
Social Credit	Ethel B. Fagan	582
Labor–Progressive	Stanley Bréhaut Ryerson	573

1957 Canadian federal election
Party	Candidate	Votes
Progressive Conservative	Bob McDonald	16,085
Liberal	Russell Reinke	11,611
Co-operative Commonwealth	David T. Lawrence	11,485
Social Credit	James Ernest Harrison	1,629

1958 Canadian federal election
Party	Candidate	Votes
Progressive Conservative	Bob McDonald	24,453
Co-operative Commonwealth	David Lawrence	10,874
Liberal	Russell Reinke	9,860

1962 Canadian federal election
Party	Candidate	Votes
Progressive Conservative	Bob McDonald	17,392
Liberal	James Charles Custeau	15,933
New Democratic	William Dean Howe	15,899
Social Credit	Peter Paul Lepp	657

1963 Canadian federal election
Party	Candidate	Votes
New Democratic	William Dean Howe	19,205
Liberal	James Charles Custeau	17,842
Progressive Conservative	Bob McDonald	16,441
Social Credit	Peter Paul Lepp	459

1965 Canadian federal election
Party	Candidate	Votes
New Democratic	William Dean Howe	22,736
Liberal	James Alexander Bethune	19,693
Progressive Conservative	Ralph Whittington Brown	11,425
Social Credit	Russell Thomas Davis	359

== See also ==
- List of Canadian electoral districts
- Historical federal electoral districts of Canada
