= Peter Dyakowski =

Canadian football player (born 1984)

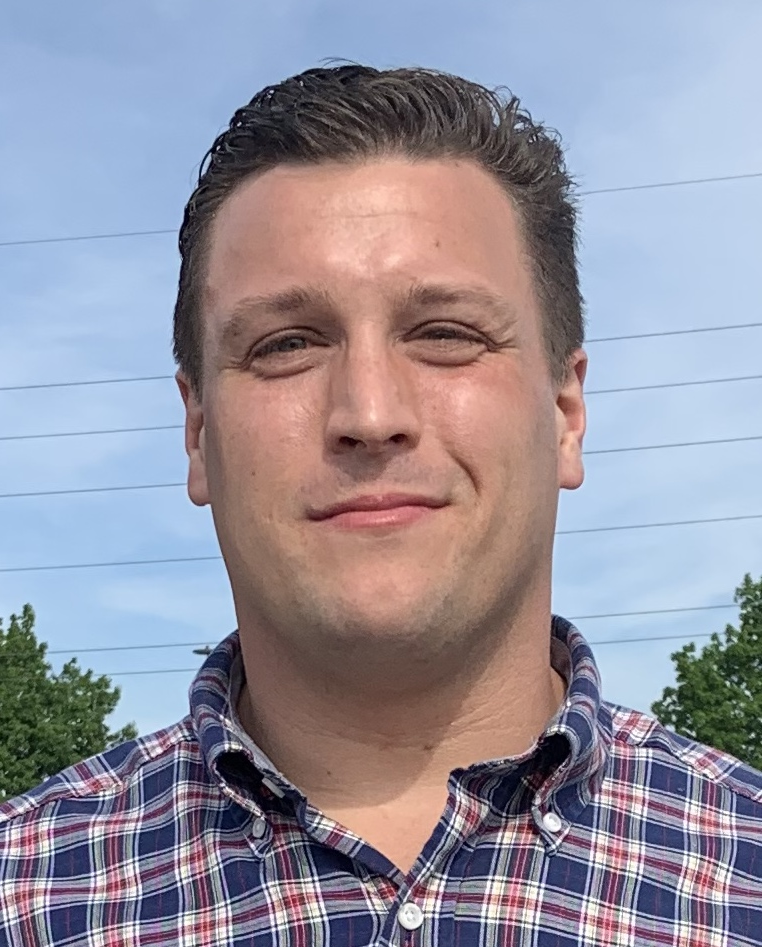
- Dyakowski in 2019

No. 54
- Position: Offensive lineman

Personal information
- Born: April 19, 1984 (age 42); Vancouver, British Columbia, Canada
- Listed height: 6 ft 5 in (1.96 m)
- Listed weight: 315 lb (143 kg)

Career information
- High school: Vancouver College
- College: LSU
- CFL draft: 2006: 2nd round, 11th overall pick

Career history
- 2007–2016: Hamilton Tiger-Cats
- 2017: Toronto Argonauts*
- 2017: Saskatchewan Roughriders
- * Offseason or practice squad member only

Awards and highlights
- CFL East All-Star (2012); BCS national champion (2003)
- Stats at CFL.ca

Peter Stefan Dyakowski (born April 19, 1984) is a Canadian former professional football offensive lineman, who played in the Canadian Football League (CFL). He played for the Hamilton Tiger-Cats from 2007 to 2016 and the Saskatchewan Roughriders in 2017. Dyakowski has also served as Treasurer of the Canadian Football League Players' Association (CFLPA).

== Early life ==
Dyakowski did not start playing football until he entered Grade 10 at Vancouver College. After high school, he signed a national letter of intent to play for Louisiana State Tigers and signed a football scholarship for the Louisiana State University.

In his early years at LSU he was nicknamed "the Mullet" because of his hair style, and captured a national title in 2004. In 2003 and 2004 he was a member of the SEC Academic Honor Roll. Then, as a senior at LSU he received the Southeastern Conference Community Service Team Player of the Week Award and was LSU's nominee for the 2006 Southeastern Conference Football Good Works Team.

He was named to ESPN.com's All Bowl Team and played in the Inta Juice North-South All Star Game following his senior season at LSU.

== Professional career ==
=== New Orleans Saints ===
He was not picked by any team in the 2007 NFL draft, but signed a free agent contract with the New Orleans Saints shortly thereafter. Nevertheless he was subsequently released.

=== Hamilton Tiger-Cats ===
Dyakowski was drafted by the Hamilton Tiger-Cats in the second round of the 2006 CFL draft. In 2011 Dyakowski was the Tiger-Cats' nominee for the CFL's Most Outstanding Offensive Lineman Award. In 2012, he was named a CFL Eastern Division All Star and was also named to the CFLPA All-Star Team. In 2013, he was again voted to the CFLPA All-Star Team. On February 16, 2017, the Tiger Cats released Dyakowski. Dyakowski played 10 seasons for the Tiger-Cats, playing in 148 regular season games.

=== Toronto Argonauts ===
After being released by the Tiger-Cats Dyakowski signed with the Toronto Argonauts later that same day.

=== Saskatchewan Roughriders ===
On May 27, 2017, the Argonauts traded Dyakowski to the Saskatchewan Roughriders in exchange for wide receiver Armanti Edwards. He played in all 18 regular season games, as well as the Riders' playoff games of the 2017 season. Dyakowski was released by the Riders on April 24, 2018.

== Politics ==
In February 2019, Dyakowski was selected to run as the Conservative Party of Canada candidate for the riding of Hamilton Mountain in the 2019 Canadian federal election. Dyakowski vowed to fight for workers rights and to promote the economic revitalization of Canada.

== Other activities ==
In 2012, he won the Canadian Broadcasting Corporation reality television show Canada's Smartest Person. He defeated spoken word artist Greg Frankson and journalism student Laura Suen, both from Toronto, and science teacher Marshall Carroll from Winnipeg.

Dyakowski appeared on an episode of Jeopardy! broadcast on Tuesday, June 3, 2014, finishing in third place.

Dyakowski attended the same elementary school as Canadian performer and playwright Katherine Cullen, and is the subject of the song "Peter Dyakowski Won" in Stupidhead!, Cullen's autobiographical comedic musical about growing up with dyslexia.

== Electoral record ==
2019 Canadian federal election: Hamilton Mountain
Party	Candidate	Votes	%	±%	Expenditures
New Democratic	Scott Duvall	19,135	36.1	+0.21	$49,075.51
Liberal	Bruno Uggenti	16,057	30.3	-3.22	$69,313.38
Conservative	Peter Dyakowski	13,443	25.5	-0.20	$95,613.48
Green	Dave Urquhart	3,115	5.9	+3.31	none listed
People's	Trevor Lee	760	1.44	-	$668.87
Christian Heritage	Jim Enos	330	0.6	-0.24	none listed
Rhinoceros	Richard Plett	109	0.2	-	none listed
Total valid votes/expense limit		52,949	100.0		
Total rejected ballots		489			
Turnout		53,438	66.0		
Eligible voters		80,992			
New Democratic hold		Swing		+1.72	
Source: Elections Canada
