= John Roxburgh Smith =

Canadian politician

The Reverend John Roxburgh Smith

Ontario MPP
- In office 1967–1977
- Preceded by: New riding
- Succeeded by: Brian Charlton
- Constituency: Hamilton Mountain

Personal details
- Born: November 10, 1936 London, Ontario
- Died: December 6, 2018 (aged 82) Hamilton, Ontario
- Party: Progressive Conservative
- Occupation: Anglican presbyter

John Roxburgh Smith (November 10, 1936 – December 6, 2018), listed in some directories as John Roxborough Smith, was a Canadian politician, who represented the electoral district of Hamilton Mountain in the Legislative Assembly of Ontario from 1967 to 1977 as a Progressive Conservative member.

== Politics ==
Smith was born in London, Ontario in 1939. He was an alderman for Hamilton, Ontario City Council in the early 1960s.

In the 1967 provincial election, he ran as the Progressive Conservative candidate in the new riding of Hamilton Mountain. He defeated NDP candidate John Dowling by 1,083 votes. He was re-elected in 1971 and 1975. In the 1977 provincial election, he was defeated by NDP challenger Brian Charlton by 373 votes.

In October 1975, he was appointed as Minister of Correctional Services. In February 1977, he was appointed as Minister of Government Services but served only four months when he was defeated by Charlton in June 1977.

== Later life ==
As of 2015, Smith was a minister and archdeacon at St. George's Church in Hamilton. He died in 2018 at the age of 82 in Hamilton, Ontario.

Davis ministry, Province of Ontario (1971–1985)
Cabinet posts (2)
Predecessor	Office	Successor
Margaret Scrivener	Minister of Government Services; 1977 (February–June)	James Auld
Richard Potter	Minister of Correctional Services; 1975–1977	Arthur Meen
