= Marion Dewar =

Canadian politician (1928–2008)

Marion Dewar CM
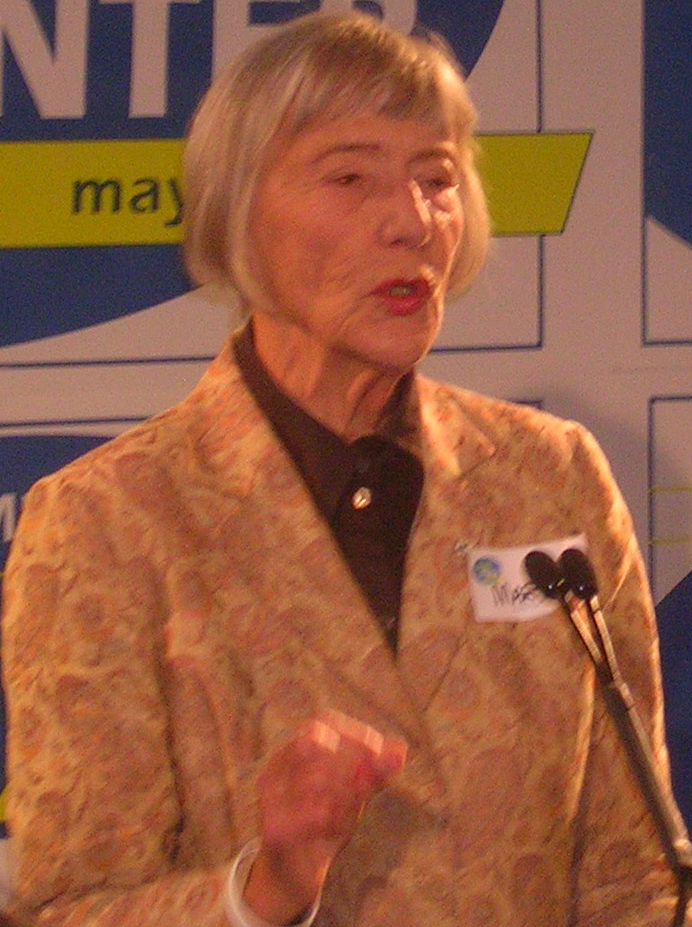
- Marion Dewar

Member of Parliament for Hamilton Mountain
- In office July 20, 1987 – November 20, 1988
- Preceded by: Ian Deans
- Succeeded by: Beth Phinney

President of the New Democratic Party
- In office June 30, 1985 – March 14, 1987
- Preceded by: Tony Penikett
- Succeeded by: Johanna den Hertog

52nd Mayor of Ottawa
- In office 1978–1985
- Preceded by: Lorry Greenberg
- Succeeded by: Jim Durrell

Ottawa Controller
- In office 1975–1978
- Preceded by: Lorry Greenberg, Tom McDougall, Ernie Jones
- Succeeded by: Brian Bourns, Bill Law

Ottawa Alderwoman
- In office 1973–1974
- Preceded by: Bill Law, Ralph Sutherland
- Constituency: Britannia Ward
- Succeeded by: Sandy Boyd

Personal details
- Born: Marion Bell; February 17, 1928 Montreal, Quebec, Canada
- Died: September 15, 2008 (aged 80) Toronto, Ontario, Canada
- Party: New Democratic
- Spouse: Ken Dewar (m. 1951; died 2003)
- Relations: Paul Dewar (son)
- Children: 5

Marion Hilda Dewar CM (February 17, 1928 – September 15, 2008) was a prominent member of the New Democratic Party (NDP), mayor of Ottawa from 1978 to 1985 and a member of the House of Commons of Canada from 1987 to 1988.

== Early life ==
Dewar was born Marion Bell in 1928 in Montreal, the daughter of Agnes and Wilson Bell. She was raised in the town of Buckingham, Quebec, just outside Ottawa. She graduated from Saint Joseph's School of Nursing in Kingston, Ontario, in 1949 and was a nurse in the Ottawa region until 1952. She married civil servant Ken Dewar in 1951 and went into public health with the Victorian Order of Nurses. A devoted Roman Catholic, she would have 5 children, the last in 1963. She later studied nursing science and public health at the University of Ottawa, and was a public health nurse from 1969 to 1971.

== Political career ==
=== Municipal politics ===
Dewar was elected alderman for Ottawa's Britannia Ward in 1972 and became Deputy Mayor in 1974, a position she held until 1978. In 1977, she ran unsuccessfully for the Ontario New Democratic Party in the provincial election in the riding of Ottawa West. She was elected mayor in 1978.

Marion Dewar served as Mayor of Ottawa from 1978 to 1985, during which she strongly advocated for gay rights. In 1978, six months into her term, she convened a convention on the issue of homosexuality. In 1982, Mayor Marion Dewar participated in the ribbon-cutting ceremony at Ottawa's first feminist bookstore, the Ottawa Women's Bookstore, signifying a period of growth in the women's lesbian and gay community and underscoring her commitment to addressing and promoting LGBT rights within the community.

In 1979, she led Project 4000, in which Ottawa residents sponsored 4,000 Vietnamese, Cambodian and Laotian refugees. Ottawa today still has a large Vietnamese community. In 2005, she appeared on the Vietnamese diaspora music variety show Paris By Night 77 as part of a show commemorating the 30th anniversary of the fall of Saigon. She was interviewed and given a plaque for her support for Vietnamese refugees.

Dewar was a peace activist and campaigner for nuclear disarmament, and, for example, picketed the U.S. Embassy in Ottawa after the invasion of Grenada. She appeared in the 1985 documentary Speaking Our Peace.

=== Federal politics ===
From 1985 to 1987, Dewar was president of the federal NDP, succeeding Tony Penikett. She was elected to the House of Commons of Canada in a 1987 by-election in the riding of Hamilton Mountain, replacing NDP incumbent Ian Deans. She had been invited to the riding in the hopes that, as a star candidate, she would keep the riding in NDP hands, but she faced strong competition for the nomination from future MP David Christopherson. She was defeated in the 1988 general election, losing to Liberal Beth Phinney by only 73 votes.

Continuing to play a prominent role in the NDP, she was one of the leading backers of Audrey McLaughlin's leadership bid. In the 1993 election Dewar attempted to return to Parliament for the riding of Ottawa Centre, but lost to Liberal incumbent Mac Harb in an election in which the NDP fared poorly across the country.

=== Later career ===
She also served as the chair of the Ottawa-Carleton Police Services Board, which oversaw the merger of the Ottawa, Nepean, and Gloucester police forces into a unified organization. However, in December 1995, she and the three other provincially appointed members of the board were fired in mid-term by the new provincial government of Mike Harris who disagreed with their political views. The three Ottawa City Council appointees were not dismissed. Dewar and a fellow board member, Judy Hunter, sued the government for unfair dismissal. In a precedent-setting case the court ruled in their favour, and they won again on appeal.

She remained politically active throughout, supporting the political career of her son Paul Dewar, who was elected to Parliament in the 2006 federal election, winning the Ottawa Centre riding for the NDP. She also supported Alex Munter in his unsuccessful mayoral candidacy later the same year (2006).

In addition to her political activities, Dewar did voluntary work for many community organisations, including the Ottawa Women's Credit Union. In 1995 she became chair of Oxfam Canada.

In 2002, Dewar was made a Member of the Order of Canada, Canada's highest civilian honour.

=== Death ===
On Friday afternoon September 12, 2008, Dewar was rushed to a Toronto hospital after suffering a serious fall and subsequent brain hemorrhage. She was in Toronto attending the 2008 Toronto International Film Festival. Her son Paul Dewar interrupted his 2008 re-election bid to travel and be by her side with other family members, but on September 15 Marion Dewar died. On that day the City of Ottawa lowered civic flags outside Ottawa City Hall in her memory. She would return to Ottawa City Hall for the last time to lie in state in the Jean Pigott Hall until her funeral service on September 19. Among the over 800 people attending the public service were notable politicians including Ontario Premier Dalton McGuinty.

On May 31, 2009, the Ottawa Vietnamese community celebrated the 30th anniversary of Project 4000 with her son and re-elected MP Paul Dewar.

== Legacy ==
Marion Dewar Plaza, which provided a central site for festivals and special events, is located at 110 Laurier Avenue W., adjacent to the Ottawa City Hall complex.

- The Ottawa Community Immigrant Services Organization (OCISO) established the Marion Dewar Scholarship Fund in 2009, which has a legacy endowment of $20,000, which helps to pay for the tuition and supplies required for the post-secondary education of refugee and immigrant high school students.
