= Sophia Aggelonitis =

Canadian businesswoman and former politician

The Honourable Sophia Aggelonitis ECO
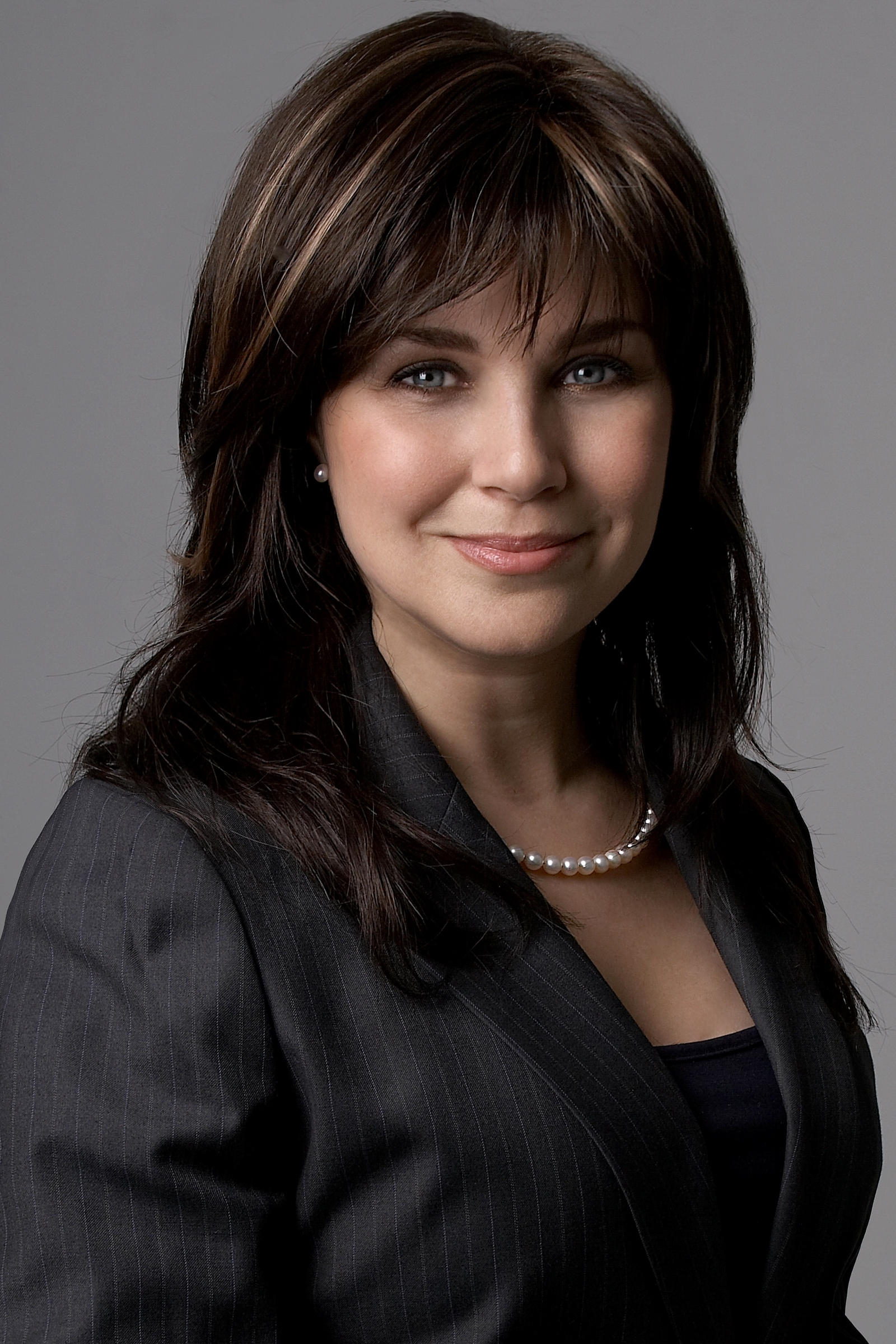

Ontario MPP
- In office 2007–2011
- Preceded by: Marie Bountrogianni
- Succeeded by: Monique Taylor
- Constituency: Hamilton Mountain

Personal details
- Born: 1968 (age 57–58) Toronto, Ontario, Canada
- Party: Ontario Liberal
- Occupation: Entrepreneur; politician

Sophia Aggelonitis (born c. 1968) is a Canadian businesswoman and former politician. She was a Liberal member of the Legislative Assembly of Ontario who represented the riding of Hamilton Mountain from 2007 to 2011. She served as the province's Minister of Revenue and Minister Responsible for Seniors in the Liberal government of Premier Dalton McGuinty.

== Background ==
Agglenotis was born in Toronto and raised in Welland, Ontario. She is the daughter of Greek immigrants who came from Sparta, Greece in the 1960s. She went to school at Eastdale High School and Brock University where she obtained a degree in politics and psychology. She has worked as a consultant specializing in special events and environmental auditing. Her most recent venture was one called "Sauces by Sophia" selling a brand of tzatziki to supermarkets and specialty food stores in Southern Ontario. In March 2007 she became president of the Hamilton Chamber of Commerce. However, she resigned three months later to pursue the Liberal nomination after Marie Bountrogianni announced that she would not seek another term in office.

== Politics ==
Aggelonitis ran as the Liberal candidate in the 2007 provincial election, defeating the NDP candidate by 2,334 votes. Following the election she was appointed Parliamentary Assistant to Harinder Takhar, the Minister of Small Business and Entrepreneurship.

She later served as Parliamentary Assistant to Ted McMeekin, Minister of Consumer Services, and Sandra Pupatello, Minister of Economic Development and Trade. She was also named chair of the Small Business Agency of Ontario to encourage better communication between government and small business.

In 2009, Aggelonitis introduced a private member's bill called An Act to proclaim Mental Health Awareness Day, calling for the last day of Mental Health Week each year to be proclaimed Mental Health Awareness Day.

On January 18, 2010, Aggelonitis was named Minister of Consumer Services. On August 18, 2010, she was named Minister of Revenue and Minister Responsible for Seniors. In those capacities she presided over legislation to combat contraband tobacco and the implementation of stronger protections for retirement home residents.

She ran for re-election in the 2011 provincial election, but was defeated by New Democrat Monique Taylor by 5,798 votes.

=== Cabinet posts ===
McGuinty ministry, Province of Ontario (2003–2013)
Cabinet posts (2)
Predecessor	Office	Successor
John Wilkinson	Minister of Revenue; 2010–2011; Also Responsible for Seniors	Dwight Duncan (Note: Revenue merged into Ministry of Finance after 2011 election.)
Ted McMeekin	Minister of Consumer Services; 2010 (January–August)	Margarett Best

=== Electoral record ===
2007 Ontario general election: Hamilton Mountain
Party	Candidate	Votes	%	±%
Liberal	Sophia Aggelonitis	17,387	37.24	–14.55
New Democratic	Bryan Adamczyk	15,653	33.53	+7.07
Progressive Conservative	Bob Charters	10,982	23.52	+4.51
Green	Ivan Miletic	2,172	4.65	+3.56
Family Coalition	Mary Maan	493	1.06	–0.59
Total valid votes		46,687	99.22	
Total rejected, unmarked and declined ballots		368	0.78	+0.10
Turnout		47,055	53.33	–5.63
Eligible voters		88,231		
Liberal hold		Swing		–10.81
Source: Elections Ontario

2011 Ontario general election: Hamilton Mountain
Party	Candidate	Votes	%	±%
New Democratic	Monique Taylor	20,492	45.16	+11.64
Liberal	Sophia Aggelonitis	14,694	32.38	–4.86
Progressive Conservative	Geordie Elms	8,641	19.04	–4.48
Green	Tony Morris	748	1.65	–3.00
Family Coalition	Jim Enos	450	0.99	–0.06
Libertarian	Hans Wienhold	222	0.49	–
Freedom	Brian Goodwin	126	0.28	–
Total valid votes		45,373	99.54	
Total rejected, unmarked and declined ballots		208	0.46	–0.33
Turnout		45,581	50.45	–2.89
Eligible voters		90,355		
New Democratic gain from Liberal		Swing		+8.25
Source: Elections Ontario

== After politics ==
In September 2012, Aggelonitis was named as president of the Ontario Liberal Fund, a body that will co-ordinate fundraising activities for the party on the province. She also serves as a judge on a local entrepreneurship contest called the "Lion's Lair" which awards cash and business resources to the winners of the contest.
