= Chris Charlton =

Retired Canadian politician

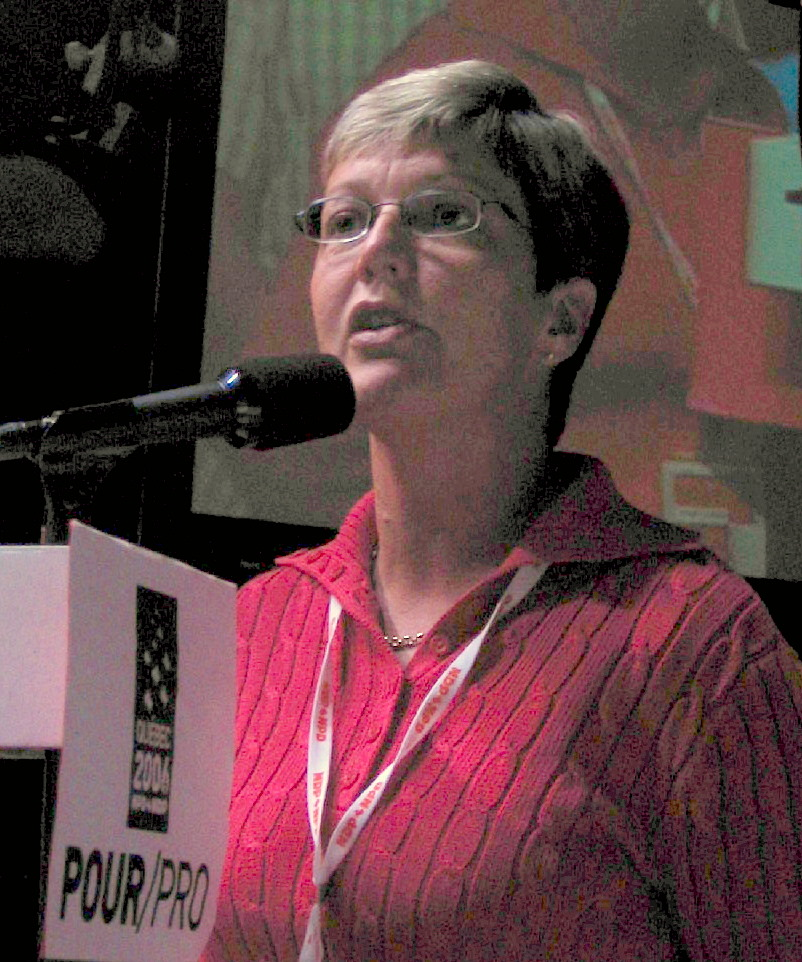
- Charlton in September 2006

Member of Parliament for Hamilton Mountain
- In office January 23, 2006 – August 4, 2015
- Preceded by: Beth Phinney
- Succeeded by: Scott Duvall

Personal details
- Born: Chris Happel; July 4, 1963 (age 63) Dortmund, West Germany
- Party: New Democratic
- Spouse: Brian Charlton
- Education: University of Western Ontario; McMaster University
- Occupation: Politician
- Profession: Political adviser; consultant; teaching assistant

Chris Charlton (born July 4, 1963) is a German-born, retired Canadian politician from the City of Hamilton, Ontario. As a New Democrat, she served as the member of Parliament for Hamilton Mountain from 2006 until 2015.

== Background ==
Charlton was born in Dortmund, Germany and immigrated to Canada with her parents in 1975. She attended the University of Western Ontario for undergraduate studies and then McMaster University to pursue a master's degree in Political Science. During this time, she became active with the New Democratic Youth club on campus. Soon after, Bob Rae and the New Democrats came to power in Ontario, and Charlton received a job as a political advisor with the government, where her husband, Brian Charlton (whom she married in 1992), was a cabinet minister. The Progressive Conservatives defeated Rae's government in the 1995 provincial election.

== Politics ==
At the time the Hamilton Mountain New Democrats held their nomination meeting to declare a candidate to run against Beth Phinney in 1997, Charlton had become a Teaching Assistant at U of T and had nearly completed her studies. Though only 33 at the time, she had already served as an advisor to Bob Rae's government, and went unopposed in the nomination. On election night, she placed 4th out of 6 candidates, which would be the lowest she would ever poll in an election campaign.

Over the course of the next nine years, she would run in the 1999 provincial election and the 2003 provincial election, the Hamilton municipal election of 2000 and two federal elections in 1997 and 2004.

Just prior to the 2006 election, she was the Director of Community Relations with Big Brothers and Big Sisters of Canada, but resigned her position to stand again, this time against Ward 7 Councillor Bill Kelly, who she attempted to unseat in the Hamilton municipal election of 2000. Charlton won that race by a 6-point margin, and retook the riding for the New Democrats after 17 years of Liberal representation.

In 2008, Charlton faced another former Ward 7 councillor, Terry Anderson of the Conservatives and local lawyer Tyler Banham of the Liberals. Despite an aggressive internet campaign on behalf of the Liberals, the race became a New Democrat-Conservative match, which saw Charlton increase voter support despite a lower voter turnout than in 2006.

Charlton announce on December 5, 2014 that she was not going to run for re-election in the next federal election in a year's time, after almost a decade in parliament and 25 years in politics.

In the 2009 Ontario New Democratic Leadership race, Charlton officially endorsed Andrea Horwath for leader, who would win the position on the third ballot.

== Electoral history ==
=== Federal ===
2011 Canadian federal election
Party	Candidate	Votes	%	±%
New Democratic	Chris Charlton	25,573	47.2	+3.4%
Conservative	Terry Anderson	17,946	33.1	+2.4%
Liberal	Marie Bountrogianni	8,795	16.2	-4%
Green	Stephen Brotherston	1,508	2.8	-2.7%
Total valid votes		54,264	–	-10.9%
Total rejected ballots		261		
Turnout		–	%	

2008 Canadian federal election
Party	Candidate	Votes	%	±%
New Democratic	Chris Charlton	22,796	43.7	+6.4%
Conservative	Terry Anderson	16,010	30.7	+3.5%
Liberal	Tyler Banham	10,531	20.2	-11.7%
Green	Stephen Brotherston	2,884	5.5	+2.9%
Total valid votes		52,221	–	-10.9%
Total rejected ballots		293		
Turnout		–	%	

2006 Canadian federal election
Party	Candidate	Votes	%	±%
New Democratic	Chris Charlton	21,869	37.3%	
Liberal	Bill Kelly	18,697	31.9%	
Conservative	Don Graves	15,915	27.2%	
Green	Susan Wadsworth	1,510	2.6%	
Christian Heritage	Stephen Downey	458	0.8%	
Marxist–Leninist	Paul Lane	131	0.2%	
Total valid votes		58,580		

2004 Canadian federal election
Party	Candidate	Votes
Liberal	Beth Phinney	18,548
New Democratic	Chris Charlton	17,552
Conservative	Tom Jackson	15,590
Green	Jo Pavlov	1,378
Marxist–Leninist	Paul Lane	214

1997 Canadian federal election
Party	Candidate	Votes
Liberal	Beth Phinney	21,128
Progressive Conservative	John Smith	8,877
Reform	Richard F. Gaasenbeek	8,154
New Democratic	Chris Charlton	7,440
Canadian Action	Christopher M. Patty	374
Marxist–Leninist	Iqbal Sumbal	146

=== Provincial ===
1999 Ontario general election: Hamilton Mountain
Party	Candidate	Votes	%	±%
Liberal	Marie Bountrogianni	19,076	40.25	+6.34
Progressive Conservative	Trevor Pettit	16,397	34.60	-2.02
New Democratic	Chris Charlton	10,622	22.41	-3.55
Green	Kelli Gallagher	456	0.96	
Family Coalition	Jim Enos	426	0.90	-2.61
Natural Law	Bob Danio	261	0.55	
Independent	Rolf Gerstenberger	159	0.34	
Total valid votes		47,397	100.00	
Source: Elections Ontario.

2003 Ontario general election: Hamilton Mountain
Party	Candidate	Votes	%	±%
Liberal	Marie Bountrogianni	23,524	51.79	+11.54
New Democratic	Chris Charlton	12,017	26.46	+4.05
Progressive Conservative	Shakil Hassan	8,637	19.02	-15.58
Family Coalition	Eleanor Johnson	748	1.65	+0.75
Green	Selwyn Inniss	494	1.09	+0.13
Total valid votes		45,420	100.00	
Source: Elections Ontario.

=== Municipal ===
Summary of the November 13, 2000 Hamilton, Ontario Ward Seven Councillor Election
Candidate	Popular vote		
Candidate	Votes	%	±%
Bill Kelly (incumbent)	10,482	60.83%	+-%
Chris Charlton	6,011	34.88%	n/a
Mark Allan Whittle	740	4.29%	+-%
Total votes	17,233	100%	
Registered voters	39,377	43.76	
Note: All Hamilton Municipal Elections are officially non-partisan. Note: Candidate campaign colours are based on the prominent colour used in campaign items (signs, literature, etc.) and are used as a visual differentiation between candidates.
Sources: "Expressway, balance sheet weigh heavy in Ward 7", October 30, 2003 Thursday Final Edition, LOCAL; Pg. A08, 948 words
