= Russell Reinke =

Canadian politician

Alderman for Hamilton, Ontario
- In office 1949–1953

Member of Parliament for Hamilton South
- In office August 1953 – June 1957
- Preceded by: riding created
- Succeeded by: Bob McDonald

Personal details
- Born: Russell Earl Reinke; 27 December 1921 Ancaster, Ontario, Canada
- Died: 31 October 2004 (aged 82) Barrie, Ontario, Canada
- Party: Liberal
- Spouse: Dorothy Waters
- Profession: buyer, salesman

Russell Earl Reinke (27 December 1921 – 31 October 2004) was a Canadian businessman and politician. Reinke was a Liberal party member of the House of Commons of Canada.

Reinke was born in Ancaster, Ontario. From 1949 to 1953, Reinke was an alderman for Hamilton, Ontario's city council.

Reinke was first elected to Parliament at the Hamilton South riding in the 1953 general election then defeated there in 1957 Bob McDonald of the Progressive Conservative party. Reinke made an attempt to unseat McDonald in the 1958 election but was unsuccessful.

Reinke went on to be the Reeve of Saltfleet twp. and sat on the Hamilton Hydro Commission. He began a cable TV company in Hamilton which he sold in 1979. He was also the VP of a large steel company in Hamilton (Usarco), he retired in 1981 and moved his family to the Cayman Islands, returning to spend summers at his cottage on Lake Joseph. Reinke was also a gospel singer and recorded two studio produced albums. Reinke sang at many local churches in Muskoka right up until he passed suddenly in the fall, after moving to Barrie in the summer of 2004.

Reinke died in Barrie on 31 October 2004.
