= Democratic Renewal Secretariat =

Government agency in Ontario, Canada

The Democratic Renewal Secretariat was an Ontario government agency, created in 2003, mandated to strengthen the Canadian province of Ontario electoral system. The office's mandated responsibilities deal primarily with engaging youth voters, encouraging open debate on electoral reforms, encouraging transparency and accountability, and to develop legislation for fixed election dates in Ontario.

In 2006 the office of the Democratic Renewal Secretariat oversaw the formation of an independent jury of Ontarians called the Citizens' Assembly on Electoral Reform to examine the electoral system in Ontario, research possible reforms and to furnish a report to be submitted to the government of Ontario.

The secretariat was overseen by the Minister responsible for Democratic Renewal, previously the Honourable Marie Bountrogianni.
