= Lisa Hepfner =

Canadian politician (born 1971)

Lisa Hepfner MP
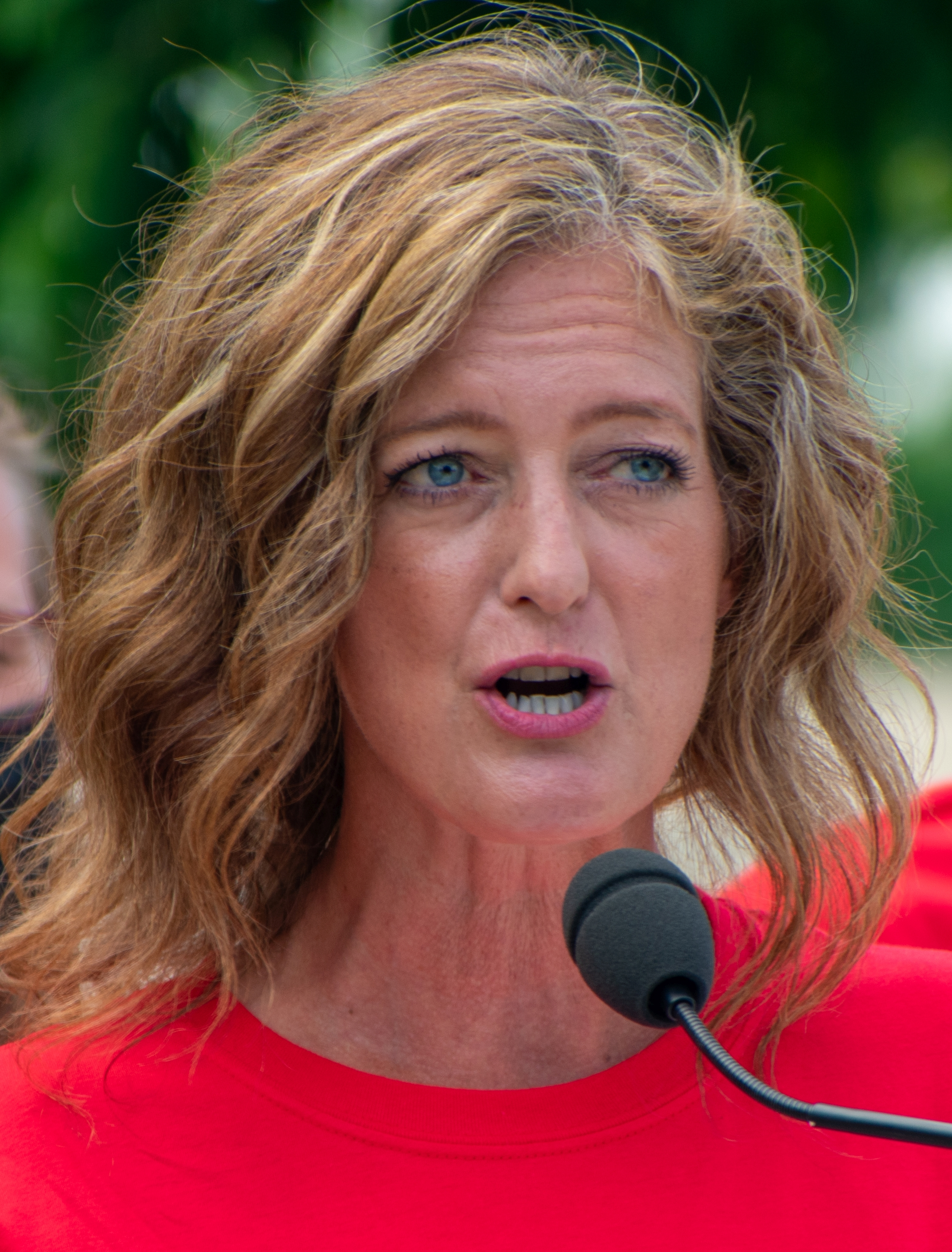

Member of Parliament for Hamilton Mountain
- Incumbent
- Assumed office September 20, 2021
- Preceded by: Scott Duvall

Personal details
- Born: June 17, 1971 (age 55) Halifax, Nova Scotia, Canada
- Party: Liberal
- Education: University of Calgary, Toronto Metropolitan University, McMaster University
- Occupation: Politician; journalist
- Website: https://lisahepfner.libparl.ca/

Lisa Hepfner (born June 17, 1971) is a Canadian politician who was elected to represent the riding of Hamilton Mountain in the House of Commons of Canada in the 2021 Canadian federal election. Prior to her election to the House of Commons, she was a television news journalist for CHCH News.

In 2011, she was honoured with a YWCA Hamilton Women of Distinction Award for politics and public affairs.

== Political career ==
In September 2023, the Prime Minister announced that Lisa Hepfner was chosen to serve as Parliamentary Secretary to the Minister for Women and Gender Equality and Youth, a position she held until March 2025.

After being re-elected in 2025, she began serving as chair of the Canadian House of Commons Standing Committee on Canadian Heritage.

In the first session of the 45th Parliament, Hepfner presented Private Member's Bill C-223, the Keeping Children Safe Act, an amendment to the Divorce Act.

Second reading and referral to committee took place on Feb. 4, 2026.

The Keeping Children Safe Act requires legal advisors to take family violence into account and changes the existing premise that children are property that must be split equally in the divorce.

The National Association of Women and the Law (NAWL) said the legislation marks a renewed call from nearly 300 organizations across Canada for urgent reform to end use of "parental alienation" allegations in family court.

At the time of the 2025 Canadian federal election, she lived in Oakville, Ontario.

== Electoral record ==
2025 Canadian federal election: Hamilton Mountain
Party	Candidate	Votes	%	±%	Expenditures
Liberal	Lisa Hepfner	27,302	45.58	+11.08	$116,114.05
Conservative	Ken Hewitt	24,857	41.50	+16.45	$111,337.71
New Democratic	Monique Taylor	7,044	11.76	–19.80	$128,674.81
People's	Bing Wong	497	0.83	–5.49	$1,815.37
Marxist–Leninist	Rolf Gerstenberger	193	0.32	N/A	$4,180.00
Total valid votes/expense limit		59,893	99.12	—	$134,434.84
Total rejected ballots		529	0.88		
Turnout		60,422	68.21	+7.71	
Eligible voters		88,577			
Liberal notional hold		Swing		–2.81	
Source: Elections Canada

2021 Canadian federal election: Hamilton Mountain
Party	Candidate	Votes	%	±%	Expenditures
Liberal	Lisa Hepfner	16,547	34.1	+3.8	$53,627.84
New Democratic	Malcolm Allen	15,712	32.4	-3.7	$93,599.93
Conservative	Al Miles	11,838	24.4	-1.1	$50,535.87
People's	Chelsey Taylor	3,097	6.4	+5.0	$0.00
Green	Dave Urquhart	974	2.0	-3.9	$0.00
Christian Heritage	Jim Enos	336	0.7	+0.1	$500.00
Total valid votes		48,460	99.1		
Total rejected ballots		419	0.9		
Turnout		48,879	60.6		
Eligible voters		80,647			
Liberal gain from New Democratic		Swing		+3.8	
Source: Elections Canada
