= Beth Phinney =

Canadian politician

Member of Parliament for Hamilton Mountain
- In office November 21, 1988 – January 23, 2006
- Preceded by: Marion Dewar
- Succeeded by: Chris Charlton

Personal details
- Born: June 19, 1938 (age 88) Paradise, Nova Scotia
- Party: Liberal
- Education: McMaster University
- Profession: Teacher

Elizabeth Phinney (born June 19, 1938) is a former Canadian politician. She was a member of the House of Commons of Canada from 1988 until her retirement in 2005, representing the riding of Hamilton Mountain in Ontario for the Liberal Party.

== Background ==
Phinney grew up in Hamilton, Ontario, and was educated at McMaster University (earning a degree in sociology and political science) and Hamilton Teacher's College. Her first job was at Stelco. She worked as a teacher in the Saltfleet School Board from 1961 to 1964, and in Montreal from 1964 to 1967. From 1968 to 1974, she taught English as a Second Language in Quebec.

She was hired by the government of Quebec in 1974 as a supervisor of program development and a teacher trainer, holding these positions until 1979. She worked as a special assistant to Pierre de Bane, the Minister of Regional and Economic Development, in 1981. She left the following year to become a sales representative for Alec Murray Real Estate.

== Politics ==
Phinney's political career began in 1987 when she ran in a Hamilton Mountain by-election. She lost this contest to former Ottawa mayor Marion Dewar of the New Democratic Party. A year later, she defeated Dewar by 73 votes in the 1988 general election. The Liberals lost this election, and Phinney served in a number of critic portfolios over the next five years.

The Liberals won a majority government in the 1993 federal election and Phinney was re-elected over Reform Party candidate Craig Chandler, her nearest challenger, by nearly 17,000 votes. She repeated this performance in the 1997 election, defeating her nearest opponent by more than 12,000 votes. From 1998 to 2000, she served as parliamentary secretary to the Minister of National Revenue. She was also involved in efforts to reform the Canada Pension Plan.

Phinney won another easy victory in the 2000 election. She faced a much more difficult re-election in the election of 2004, with both NDP candidate Chris Charlton and Conservative city councillor Tom Jackson posing credible challenges. In a close three-way race, Phinney defeated Charlton by 996 votes.

Phinney was one of the few Liberal members of Parliament to support Sheila Copps' leadership bid in 2003. She subsequently attempted to mediate the dispute between Copps and Tony Valeri for the Liberal nomination in Hamilton East—Stoney Creek, offering to stand down to let Copps run in her riding. Copps rejected this offer.

In May 2005, she announced that she was retiring from politics and would not run in the next election.
