= Scott Duvall =

Canadian politician

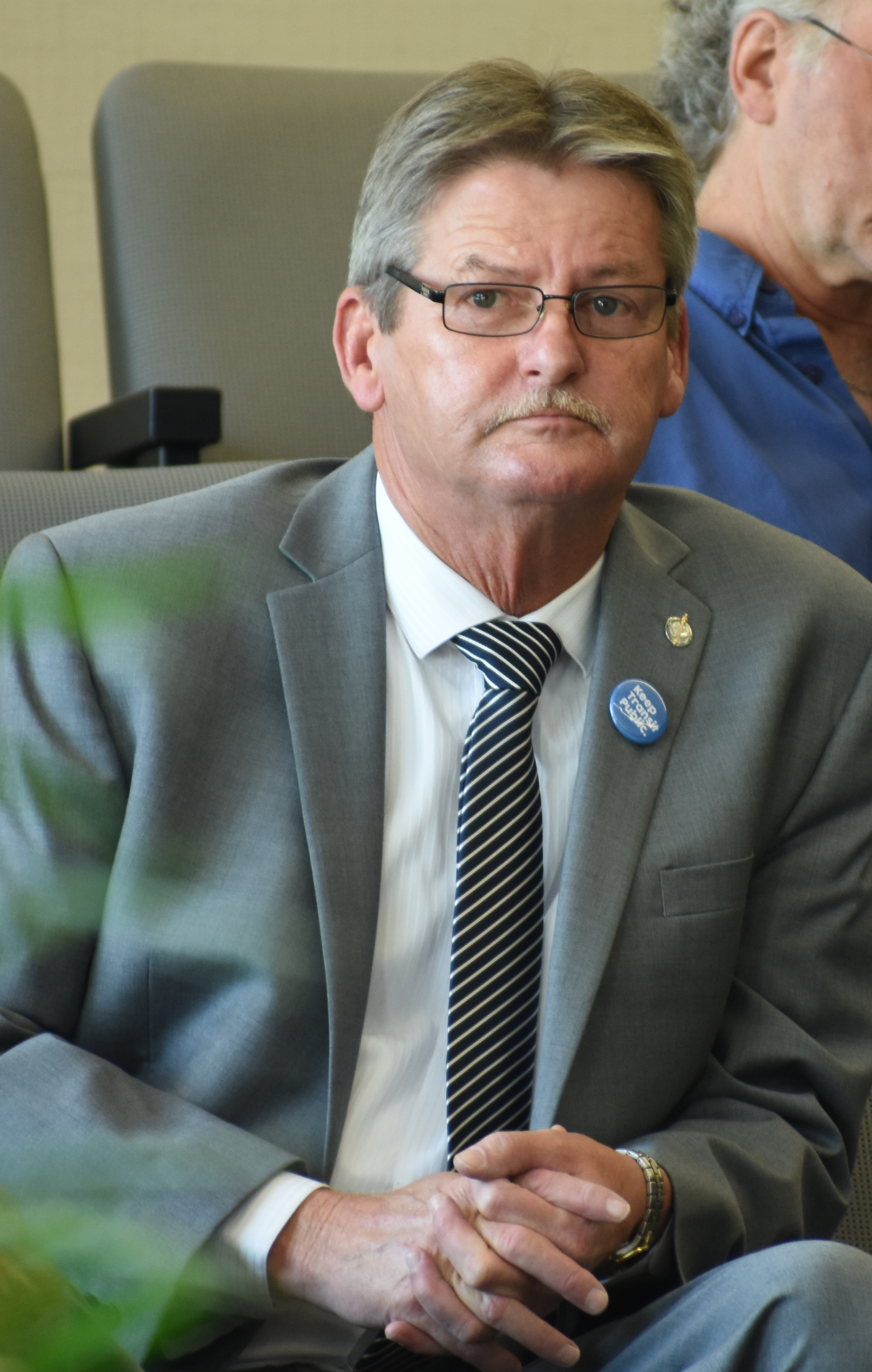
- Duvall in August 2017

Member of Parliament for Hamilton Mountain
- In office October 19, 2015 – September 20, 2021
- Preceded by: Chris Charlton
- Succeeded by: Lisa Hepfner

Hamilton City Councillor
- In office December 6, 2006 – October 28, 2015
- Preceded by: Bill Kelly
- Succeeded by: Donna Skelly
- Constituency: Ward 7 (Central Mountain)

Personal details
- Born: July 1, 1956 (age 70) Hamilton, Ontario, Canada
- Party: New Democratic
- Spouse: Sherry Duvall
- Portfolio: NDP Critic for Pensions
- Website: Official website

Scott Duvall is a retired Canadian politician who served as the member of Parliament for Hamilton Mountain from 2015 until 2021. He had previously served on Hamilton City Council representing Ward 7 (Central Mountain) from 2006 until he was elected to the House of Commons following the 2015 Canadian federal election. He was a member of the New Democratic Party.

Prior to being elected to Hamilton City Council, Duvall was a steelworker and a labour union president. Throughout the entirety of his career, he was vocal about labour issues in the Hamilton area.

== Background ==
Duvall is a Hamilton area native, born into a household with seven other siblings. He began his career working at Stelco, where his father also worked. Duvall and his wife Sherry have three daughters. He eventually became the president of his union.

== Municipal politics ==
After incumbent Ward 7 councillor Bill Kelly stood unsuccessfully as the Liberal candidate for Parliament on Hamilton Mountain in 2006, he announced he would not seek re-election to Hamilton City Council. Duvall, then the president of United Steelworkers Local 5338, was one of the highest profile candidates to replace Kelly. The campaign was contentious, and featured a Cable 14 debate which local media called "a raucous showdown" during which the candidates "accused each other of various indiscretions or misleading the voters." Duvall beat eight candidates, winning by a margin of over 10% compared to his next closest competitor.

While Duvall was a city councillor, he sat as the chair of the city's Steel Issues Subcommittee.

Duvall is one of the candidates running in the Ward 8 by-election on September 22, 2025 in an attempt to regain a seat on Hamilton City Council.

== Federal politics ==
=== First Term ===
On January 5, 2015, Duvall was selected as the NDP candidate for the Hamilton Mountain riding, after the resignation of long time NDP MP Chris Charlton. Following a tight nomination battle with former Ontario NDP candidate Bryan Adamczyk, Duvall won the nomination race.

Duvall was appointed the New Democratic Party critic for Pensions in the 42nd Parliament.

On November 6, 2017, Duvall introduced a private member's bill, Bill C-384 "An Act to amend the Bankruptcy and Insolvency Act and the Companies’ Creditors Arrangement Act (pension plans and group insurance programs)". This bill sought to amend the priority given to pensioners, in the case of bankruptcy proceedings by Canadian companies. This bill was largely in response to the underfunding of pension plans in the Bankruptcy proceedings of prominent Canadian companies Nortel and Sears Canada. Duvall has gone to multiple ridings across Canada in 2017 and 2018, to discuss the implications of the current pension laws.

=== Second Term ===
On November 13, 2018, Duvall was nominated again to run in the 2019 federal election. He has said that previous NDP leader Jack Layton inspired him to join federal politics. He also stated that issues such as pay equity, and pension reformation are his top priorities.

On March 5, 2021, Duvall announced that he would not seek re-election during the 2021 Canadian federal election. Duvall expressed a desire to spend more time with his family after over a decade in elected office. He was succeeded by Liberal candidate Lisa Hepfner.

== Electoral record ==
=== Federal ===
2019 Canadian federal election: Hamilton Mountain
Party	Candidate	Votes	%	±%	Expenditures
New Democratic	Scott Duvall	19,135	36.1	+0.21	$49,075.51
Liberal	Bruno Uggenti	16,057	30.3	-3.22	$69,313.38
Conservative	Peter Dyakowski	13,443	25.5	-0.20	$95,613.48
Green	Dave Urquhart	3,115	5.9	+3.31	none listed
People's	Trevor Lee	760	1.44	-	$668.87
Christian Heritage	Jim Enos	330	0.6	-0.24	none listed
Rhinoceros	Richard Plett	109	0.2	-	none listed
Total valid votes/expense limit		52,949	100.0		
Total rejected ballots		489			
Turnout		53,438	66.0		
Eligible voters		80,992			
New Democratic hold		Swing		+1.72	
Source: Elections Canada

2015 Canadian federal election
Party	Candidate	Votes	%	±%	Expenditures
New Democratic	Scott Duvall	18,046	35.8	-11.4	–
Liberal	Shaun Burt	16,931	33.6	+17.4	–
Conservative	Al Miles	12,986	25.7	-7.4	–
Green	Raheem Aman	1,283	2.5	-0.3	–
Libertarian	Andrew James Caton	763	1.5	–	–
Christian Heritage	Jim Enos	438	0.9	+0.4	–
Total valid votes/Expense limit		–	100.0		$209,945.37
Total rejected ballots		–	–	–	
Turnout		50,447	65.61	+3.81	
Eligible voters		76,549			
New Democratic hold		Swing		-14.4	
Source: Elections Canada

=== Municipal ===
Candidates for the October 27, 2014 Hamilton, Ontario Ward Seven Councillor Election
Candidate	Popular vote			Expenditures
Candidate	Votes	%	±%	Expenditures
Scott Duvall (incumbent)	9,956	79.12%	+21.51%	$16,626.25
Keith Beck	1,562	12.41%	+7.27	$0
Greg Burghall	1,065	8.46%	–	n/a^{1}
Total votes	13,068	31.75%	−8.15%	
Registered voters				
^{1} These candidates did not submit official Financial Statements and are, therefore, ineligible to run in the 2018 Municipal election Note: All Hamilton Municipal Elections are officially non-partisan. Note: Candidate campaign colours are based on the prominent colour used in campaign items (signs, literature, etc.) and are used as a visual differentiation between candidates.
Sources: City of Hamilton, "Nominated Candidates" Archived August 20, 2010, at the Wayback Machine

Summary of the October 25, 2010 Hamilton, Ontario Ward Seven Councillor Election
Candidate	Popular vote		
Candidate	Votes	%	±%
Scott Duvall (incumbent)	9,027	57.61%	+28.05%
Trevor Pettit	3,938	25.13%	n/a
John Gallagher	1,899	12.12%	+2.91%
Keith Beck	805	5.14%	n/a
Total votes	16,173	100%	
Registered voters	40,571	39.9 %	+2.97%
Note: All Hamilton Municipal Elections are officially non-partisan. Note: Candidate campaign colours are based on the prominent colour used in campaign items (signs, literature, etc.) and are used as a visual differentiation between candidates.
Sources: Hamilton, Ontario, City Clerk's Office Archived August 20, 2010, at the Wayback Machine

Summary of the November 13, 2006 Hamilton, Ontario Ward Seven Councillor Election
Candidate	Popular vote		
Candidate	Votes	%	±%
Scott Duvall	4,111	29.56%	-
Dennis Haining	2,554	18.36%	-
Dave Shuttleworth	2,509	18.04%	-
John Gallagher	1,281	9.21%	+1.11%
Mark DiMillo	1,179	8.48%	-
Mark Harrington	1,031	7.41%	-
Tim Nolan	994	7.15%	-
Mark-Alan Whittle	249	1.79%	-
Total votes	14,209	100%	
Registered voters	38,478	36.93%	
Note: All Hamilton Municipal Elections are officially non-partisan. Note: Candidate campaign colours are based on the prominent colour used in campaign items (signs, literature, etc.) and are used as a visual differentiation between candidates.
Sources: Hamilton, Ontario, City Clerk's Office
