= Trevor Pettit =

Canadian politician

Ontario MPP
- In office 1995–1999
- Preceded by: Brian Charlton
- Succeeded by: Marie Bountrogianni
- Constituency: Hamilton Mountain

Personal details
- Born: March 14, 1951 (age 75) Hamilton, Ontario, Canada
- Party: Progressive Conservative
- Occupation: Sales executive

Trevor Pettit (born March 14, 1951) is a former politician in Ontario, Canada. He was a Progressive Conservative member of the Ontario legislature from 1995 to 1999 who represented the riding of Hamilton Mountain.

== Background ==
Pettit was born in Hamilton. He worked as a sales director for a manufacturing company in neighbouring Dundas which is now part of Hamilton. He is married with two children.

== Politics ==
He was elected to the provincial legislature in the 1995 provincial election, defeating Liberal Marie Bountrogianni and incumbent New Democrat Brian Charlton finished third. He sat in the backbenches of Mike Harris's government during his time in the legislature. He advocated the amalgamation of Hamilton with neighbouring municipalities, a policy initiative which was passed during the Harris government's second term.

Pettit lost to Bountrigianni by about 2,500 votes in the 1999 provincial election.

In 2010, he attempted to unseat incumbent Scott Duvall for the position of Hamilton city councillor in Ward Seven, but was unsuccessful.

=== Electoral record ===
1995 Ontario general election: Hamilton Mountain
| Party | Candidate | Votes | % | ±% |
|---|---|---|---|---|
| Progressive Conservative | Trevor Pettit | 13,852 | 36.60 | +16.12 |
| Liberal | Marie Bountrogianni | 12,824 | 33.89 | +14.14 |
| New Democratic | Brian Charlton | 9,837 | 25.99 | –33.77 |
| Family Coalition | Michael O'Grady | 1,329 | 3.51 | – |
| Total valid votes | | 37,842 | 98.96 | |
| Total rejected, unmarked and declined ballots | | 399 | 1.04 | –0.34 |
| Turnout | | 38,241 | 64.41 | –2.14 |
| Eligible voters | | 59,371 | | |
| Progressive Conservative gain from New Democratic | | Swing | | +24.95 |
Source: Elections Ontario

1999 Ontario general election: Hamilton Mountain
| Party | Candidate | Votes | % | ±% |
|---|---|---|---|---|
| Liberal | Marie Bountrogianni | 19,076 | 40.25 | +6.36 |
| Progressive Conservative | Trevor Pettit | 16,397 | 34.60 | –2.01 |
| New Democratic | Chris Charlton | 10,622 | 22.41 | –3.58 |
| Green | Kelli Gallagher | 456 | 0.96 | – |
| Family Coalition | Jim Enos | 426 | 0.90 | –2.61 |
| Natural Law | Bob Danio | 261 | 0.55 | – |
| Independent | Rolf V. Gerstenberger | 159 | 0.34 | – |
| Total valid votes | | 47,397 | 99.05 | |
| Total rejected, unmarked and declined ballots | | 455 | 0.95 | –0.09 |
| Turnout | | 47,852 | 62.02 | –2.39 |
| Eligible voters | | 77,159 | | |
| Liberal gain from Progressive Conservative | | Swing | | +4.18 |
Source: Elections Ontario

Summary of the October 25, 2010 Hamilton, Ontario Ward Seven Councillor Election
| Candidate | Popular vote | | |
| Candidate | Votes | % | ±% |
|---|---|---|---|
| Scott Duvall (incumbent) | 9,027 | 57.61% | +28.05% |
| Trevor Pettit | 3,938 | 25.13% | n/a |
| John Gallagher | 1,899 | 12.12% | +2.91% |
| Keith Beck | 805 | 5.14% | n/a |
| Total votes | 16,173 | 100% | |
| Registered voters | 40,571 | 39.9 % | +2.97% |
Note: All Hamilton Municipal Elections are officially non-partisan. Note: Candidate campaign colours are based on the prominent colour used in campaign items (signs, literature, etc.) and are used as a visual differentiation between candidates.
Sources: Hamilton, Ontario, City Clerk's Office

== Later life ==
As of 2010, Pettit works as a government relations-energy consultant. He also an occasional guest columnist for local Hamilton newspapers. In 2014, he retired to Costa Rica.
