= Marie Bountrogianni =

Canadian politician

The Honourable Marie Bountrogianni ECO

Ontario MPP
- In office June 3, 1999 – October 10, 2007
- Preceded by: Trevor Pettit
- Succeeded by: Sophia Aggelonitis
- Constituency: Hamilton Mountain

Personal details
- Born: December 10, 1956 (age 69) Hamilton, Ontario, Canada
- Party: Ontario Liberal
- Spouse: Ioannis Tsanis
- Children: 2
- Occupation: Psychologist; dean

Marie Bountrogianni (born December 10, 1956) is the former dean of the Chang School of Continuing Education at Ryerson University. She is also the former chief psychologist of the Hamilton Board of Education, the former president and executive director of ROM (Royal Ontario Museum) Governors, and former member of Provincial Parliament. She was a member of the Legislative Assembly of Ontario, and a cabinet minister in the government of Liberal Premier Dalton McGuinty.

== Background ==
Bountrogianni was born in Hamilton, Ontario, the daughter of Greek immigrants. She received a Bachelor of Arts degree from the University of Waterloo in 1979, a Master of Education degree from the University of Toronto in 1980, and a Doctor of Education degree from the latter institution in 1983.

She became a registered psychologist in 1985, and was employed in psychological work at the Toronto Board of Education from 1984 to 1988. From 1989 to 1999, she was Chief Psychologist of the Hamilton Board of Education. Bountrogianni also served as an assistant professor at Wilfrid Laurier University from 1985 to 1987, and McMaster University from 1992 to 1999, and was the vice-chair of St. Peter's Hospital in Hamilton from 1995 to 1999. In 1997, she was hired by the European Union to evaluate proposals for graduate school funding. Locally, she has also served as an honorary co-chair of Hamilton & Bay AIDSwalk and Grace Haven Capital Campaign. She was a director at Northland Power Inc. and chair of its Governance Committee until May 2022. Bountrogianni also sits on the board of the Democracy Study Center in Kyiv, Ukraine and on the advisory council of Eurobank's incubator, the egg, in Athens, Greece.

== Politics ==
=== Provincial ===
Bountrogianni ran for the Ontario legislature in the 1995 provincial election, as a Liberal candidate in the riding of Hamilton Mountain. She finished ahead of incumbent New Democrat Brian Charlton, but 1028 votes behind the winner, Progressive Conservative Trevor Pettit.

Bountrogianni ran against Pettit again in the 1999 provincial election. There was some uncertainty in the riding as to whether Bountrogianni or NDP candidate Chris Charlton (wife of Brian) would have a better chance of defeating Pettit. Charlton received some union support but the teachers and the building trades backed Bountrogianni. As it happened, Bountrogianni was able to defeat Pettit by over 2500 votes, with Charlton finishing third. The Progressive Conservatives won the election, and Bountrogianni became the opposition critic for Colleges and Universities as well as Women's Issues. In 2002, she was named Woman of the Year in Politics by the Hamilton Status of Women Committee.

Bountrogianni was re-elected in the 2003 election, in which the Liberals won a majority. On October 23, 2003, she was named Minister of Children's Services and Minister of Citizenship and Immigration.

In October 2004, Bountrogianni introduced and stewarded the passage of the AODA, the Accessibility for Ontarians with Disabilities Act After a cabinet shuffle on June 29, 2005, Bountrogianni was named Minister of Intergovernmental Affairs and Minister responsible for Democratic Renewal.

She decided not to run for re-election in 2007, and was succeeded by another Liberal, Sophia Aggelonitis.

==== Cabinet positions ====
McGuinty ministry, Province of Ontario (2003–2013)
Cabinet posts (3)
Predecessor	Office	Successor
Dalton McGuinty	Minister of Intergovernmental Affairs; 2005-2007; Also Responsible for Democratic Renewal	Dalton McGuinty
Carl DeFaria	Minister of Citizenship and Immigration; 2003-2005	Michael Colle
Ministry created	Minister of Children and Youth Services; 2003-2005; Was Children's Services from 2003 to 2004	Mary Anne Chambers

=== Provincial electoral record ===
1995 Ontario general election: Hamilton Mountain
Party	Candidate	Votes	%	±%
Progressive Conservative	Trevor Pettit	13,852	36.60	+16.12
Liberal	Marie Bountrogianni	12,824	33.89	+14.14
New Democratic	Brian Charlton	9,837	25.99	–33.77
Family Coalition	Michael O'Grady	1,329	3.51	–
Total valid votes		37,842	98.96	
Total rejected, unmarked and declined ballots		399	1.04	–0.34
Turnout		38,241	64.41	–2.14
Eligible voters		59,371		
Progressive Conservative gain from New Democratic		Swing		+24.95
Source: Elections Ontario

1999 Ontario general election: Hamilton Mountain
Party	Candidate	Votes	%	±%
Liberal	Marie Bountrogianni	19,076	40.25	+6.36
Progressive Conservative	Trevor Pettit	16,397	34.60	–2.01
New Democratic	Chris Charlton	10,622	22.41	–3.58
Green	Kelli Gallagher	456	0.96	–
Family Coalition	Jim Enos	426	0.90	–2.61
Natural Law	Bob Danio	261	0.55	–
Independent	Rolf V. Gerstenberger	159	0.34	–
Total valid votes		47,397	99.05	
Total rejected, unmarked and declined ballots		455	0.95	–0.09
Turnout		47,852	62.02	–2.39
Eligible voters		77,159		
Liberal gain from Progressive Conservative		Swing		+4.18
Source: Elections Ontario

2003 Ontario general election: Hamilton Mountain
Party	Candidate	Votes	%	±%
Liberal	Marie Bountrogianni	23,524	51.79	+11.54
New Democratic	Chris Charlton	12,017	26.46	+4.05
Progressive Conservative	Shakil Hassan	8,637	19.02	–15.58
Family Coalition	Eleanor Johnson	748	1.65	+0.75
Green	Selwyn Inniss	494	1.09	+0.13
Total valid votes		45,420	99.32	
Total rejected, unmarked and declined ballots		310	0.68	–0.27
Turnout		45,730	58.96	–3.06
Eligible voters		77,565		
Liberal hold		Swing		+3.75
Source: Elections Ontario

=== Federal attempt ===
In 2011, she ran as the Liberal candidate in the 2011 federal election, finishing third behind Terry Anderson and the winner, New Democrat incumbent Chris Charlton.

=== Federal electoral record ===
2011 Canadian federal election
Party	Candidate	Votes	%	±%	Expenditures
New Democratic	Chris Charlton	25,595	47.2	+3.5	
Conservative	Terry Anderson	17,936	33.1	+2.4	
Liberal	Marie Bountrogianni	8,787	16.2	-4	
Green	Stephen Brotherson	1,505	2.8	-2.7	
Christian Heritage	Jim Enos	270	0.5	–	
Independent	Henryk Adamiec	171	0.3	–	
Total valid votes		54,264	100.0		
Total rejected ballots		261	0.5	+0.4	
Turnout		54,525	61.8	–	
Eligible voters		88,196	–	–	
Source: Elections Canada.

== After politics ==
In 2007, she became president of the Royal Ontario Museum but stepped down in February 2011 (to run for federal parliament). From 2007 to 2012, she served on the Child and Youth Committee for the Mental Health Commission of Canada (MHCC). In 2012, she was a professor at Ryerson's Chang School of Continuing Education, where she performed research and taught political psychology courses. On July 1, 2013, she was appointed the interim dean of the Chang School of Continuing Education. On April 23, 2014, she was named Dean of the Chang School of Continuing Education. She served as Dean until May 2019. She was appointed as chair of the board of Help Us Help in 2020, a foundation supporting orphans and vets in Ukraine.

== See also ==
- List of University of Waterloo people
