= Hamilton Mountain (federal electoral district) =

Federal electoral district in Ontario, Canada

Coordinates: 43.212°N 79.862°W

Ontario electoral district
- Interactive map of riding boundaries from the 2025 federal election

Federal electoral district
- Legislature: House of Commons
MP
Lisa Hepfner
Liberal
- District created: 1966
- First contested: 1968
- Last contested: 2021
- District webpage: profile, map

Demographics
- Population (2011): 103,615
- Electors (2015): 76,886
- Area (km²): 35
- Pop. density (per km²): 2,960.4
- Census division: Hamilton
- Census subdivision: Hamilton (part)

Hamilton Mountain is a federal electoral district in Ontario, Canada, that has been represented in the House of Commons of Canada since 1968. The riding is located in the Hamilton region.

The socio-economic composition of the Hamilton Mountain is diverse, with low-income public housing residents as well as million-dollar homes, highly-paid unionized workers, low-wage unskilled workers, and well-established families and recent immigrants.

That diversity makes Hamilton Mountain a swing riding in which many elections are virtually two-way or three-way ties. For instance, fewer than 100 votes separated the top two places in 1988. Only 3000 votes separated the top three candidates in 2004. From the 1990s to 2006, the races were between the Liberals and the NDP. After the Liberal Party's collapse in the late 2000s, the Conservatives became the main competitors in the riding. With the Liberal resurgence during the 2015 election, the vote difference of the three major parties has narrowed, solidifying the riding's status as a three-way tossup.

== Geography ==
In the 2012 redistribution, Hamilton Mountain lost area to Hamilton West-Ancaster-Dundas and Flamborough—Glanbrook. The riding was redefined to: a boundary starting at the Niagara Escarpment and Red Hill Creek, following the creek west to Mountain Brow Boulevard, then south to Arbour Road. It continues south along connecting roads to Rymal Road, west to Garth Street, and north to the Lincoln M. Alexander Parkway. The boundary then runs east to West 5th Street, north to James Mountain Road, and northeast back to the Niagara Escarpment, finally following the escarpment east and south to the starting point.

== History ==
The riding was created in 1966 from parts of Ancaster—Dundas—Flamborough—Aldershot, Hamilton South, Hamilton West, Stoney Creek, and Wentworth ridings.

The riding's 1966 representation order indicated that Hamilton Mountain would include that part of the City of Hamilton east of a line drawn west along Mud Street, north along Mountain Brow Boulevard, and northwest along the brow of the Mountain and the part of the Township of Glanford in the County of Wentworth lying north of County Suburban Road No. 22.

In 1976, it was redefined to consist of the part of the City of Hamilton lying south of the brow of the Mountain bounded on the east by Red Hill Creek, on the west by the west limit of the city, and on the south by Mohawk Road, Limeridge Road, and Mountain Brow Boulevard.

In 1987, it was redefined to consist of the part of the City of Hamilton lying south of the brow of the Mountain bounded by a line drawn from Mountain Brow Boulevard, west along Limeridge Road to St. Jerome School, west to Garth Street, south along Garth Street, west along the proposed Mountain Freeway.

In 1996, it was redefined to consist of the part of the City of Hamilton south of a line drawn north from the western city limit near Lisajane Court, east along Stone Church Road, north along Garth Street, east along Redhill Creek Expressway, north along West 5th Street, then east along the brow of the Niagara Escarpment to the eastern city limit.

In 2003, the riding was redefined to consist of the part of the City of Hamilton bounded by a line drawn west from the Niagara Escarpment along Red Hill Valley Parkway, south along Mountain Brow Boulevard, Arbour Road and Glover Road, west along the hydroelectric transmission line situated south of Rymal Road East, north along Glancaster Road, east along Garner Road East, north along the hydroelectric transmission line situated west of Upper Paradise Road, east along Lincoln M. Alexander Parkway, north along West 5th Street, northeast along James Mountain Road, and east and south along the Niagara Escarpment to the point of commencement.

In 2022, the riding's boundaries were updated again. While remaining similar to the 2012 Representation Order, Hamilton Mountain gained a small section of Flamborough—Glanbrook. The riding's new southern border was extended to the hydroelectric transmission line between Garth Street and Glover Road, effectively reincorporating portions of the riding that were lost in 2012.

== Demographics ==
According to the 2021 Canadian census

Languages: 69.6% English, 3.0% Arabic, 2.5% Italian, 2.3% Spanish, 2.0% Tagalog, 1.4% Aramaic, 1.3% Portuguese, 1.0% French

Religions: 57.4% Christian (30.5% Catholic, 3.8% Anglican, 3.4% United Church, 2.5% Christian Orthodox, 1.6% Presbyterian, 1.4% Pentecostal, 1.4% Baptist, 12.8% Other), 7.7% Muslim, 1.5% Hindu, 30.9% None

Median income: $39,200 (2020)

Average income: $46,360 (2020)

Panethnic groups in Hamilton Mountain (2011−2021)
Panethnic group	2021		2016		2011	
Panethnic group	Pop.	%	Pop.	%	Pop.	%
European (Note: Statistic includes all persons that did not make up part of a visible minority or an indigenous identity.)	72,350	67.91%	77,715	74.99%	81,190	79.21%
Middle Eastern (Note: Statistic includes total responses of "West Asian" and "Arab" under visible minority section on census.)	6,885	6.46%	4,570	4.41%	4,195	4.09%
Southeast Asian (Note: Statistic includes total responses of "Filipino" and "Southeast Asian" under visible minority section on census.)	6,370	5.98%	4,845	4.67%	3,875	3.78%
African	6,225	5.84%	4,575	4.41%	4,395	4.29%
South Asian	5,330	5%	3,490	3.37%	2,505	2.44%
Latin American	2,475	2.32%	2,310	2.23%	2,105	2.05%
Indigenous	2,245	2.11%	2,120	2.05%	1,510	1.47%
East Asian (Note: Statistic includes total responses of "Chinese", "Korean", and "Japanese" under visible minority section on census.)	2,190	2.06%	2,280	2.2%	1,910	1.86%
Other/multiracial (Note: Statistic includes total responses of "Visible minority, n.i.e." and "Multiple visible minorities" under visible minority section on census.)	2,475	2.32%	1,750	1.69%	795	0.78%
Total responses	106,535	98.98%	103,640	98.82%	102,505	98.93%
Total population	107,629	100%	104,877	100%	103,615	100%
Notes: Totals greater than 100% due to multiple origin responses. Demographics based on 2012 Canadian federal electoral redistribution riding boundaries.

== Members of Parliament ==
This riding has elected the following members of Parliament:

Parliament	Years	Member	Party
Hamilton Mountain; Riding created from Hamilton South and Hamilton West
28th	1968–1972	Gordon J. Sullivan	Liberal
29th	1972–1974	Duncan Beattie	Progressive Conservative
30th	1974–1979	Gus MacFarlane	Liberal
31st	1979–1980	Duncan Beattie	Progressive Conservative
32nd	1980–1984	Ian Deans	New Democratic
33rd	1984–1986	Ian Deans	New Democratic
33rd	1987–1988	Marion Dewar	New Democratic
34th	1988–1993	Beth Phinney	Liberal
35th	1993–1997	Beth Phinney	Liberal
36th	1997–2000	Beth Phinney	Liberal
37th	2000–2004	Beth Phinney	Liberal
38th	2004–2006	Beth Phinney	Liberal
39th	2006–2008	Chris Charlton	New Democratic
40th	2008–2011	Chris Charlton	New Democratic
41st	2011–2015	Chris Charlton	New Democratic
42nd	2015–2019	Scott Duvall	New Democratic
43rd	2019–2021	Scott Duvall	New Democratic
44th	2021–2025	Lisa Hepfner	Liberal
45th	2025–present	Lisa Hepfner	Liberal

== Election results ==
View source data.
Graph of election results in Hamilton Mountain (minor parties that never got 2% of the vote or didn't run consistently are omitted)

2025 Canadian federal election
Party	Candidate	Votes	%	±%	Expenditures
Liberal	Lisa Hepfner	27,302	45.58	+11.08	$116,114.05
Conservative	Ken Hewitt	24,857	41.50	+16.45	$111,337.71
New Democratic	Monique Taylor	7,044	11.76	–19.80	$128,674.81
People's	Bing Wong	497	0.83	–5.49	$1,815.37
Marxist–Leninist	Rolf Gerstenberger	193	0.32	N/A	$4,180.00
Total valid votes/expense limit		59,893	99.12	—	$134,434.84
Total rejected ballots		529	0.88		
Turnout		60,422	68.21	+7.71	
Eligible voters		88,577			
Liberal notional hold		Swing		–2.81	
Source: Elections Canada

2021 federal election redistributed results
Party	Vote	%
Liberal	17,962	34.50
New Democratic	16,433	31.56
Conservative	13,042	25.05
People's	3,289	6.32
Green	1,039	2.00
Others	306	0.59

2021 Canadian federal election
Party	Candidate	Votes	%	±%	Expenditures
Liberal	Lisa Hepfner	16,547	34.1	+3.8	$53,627.84
New Democratic	Malcolm Allen	15,712	32.4	-3.7	$93,599.93
Conservative	Al Miles	11,838	24.4	-1.1	$50,535.87
People's	Chelsey Taylor	3,097	6.4	+5.0	$0.00
Green	Dave Urquhart	974	2.0	-3.9	$0.00
Christian Heritage	Jim Enos	336	0.7	+0.1	$500.00
Total valid votes		48,460	99.1		
Total rejected ballots		419	0.9		
Turnout		48,879	60.6		
Eligible voters		80,647			
Liberal gain from New Democratic		Swing		+3.8	
Source: Elections Canada

2019 Canadian federal election
Party	Candidate	Votes	%	±%	Expenditures
New Democratic	Scott Duvall	19,135	36.1	+0.21	$49,075.51
Liberal	Bruno Uggenti	16,057	30.3	-3.22	$69,313.38
Conservative	Peter Dyakowski	13,443	25.5	-0.20	$95,613.48
Green	Dave Urquhart	3,115	5.9	+3.31	none listed
People's	Trevor Lee	760	1.44	-	$668.87
Christian Heritage	Jim Enos	330	0.6	-0.24	none listed
Rhinoceros	Richard Plett	109	0.2	-	none listed
Total valid votes/expense limit		52,949	100.0		
Total rejected ballots		489			
Turnout		53,438	66.0		
Eligible voters		80,992			
New Democratic hold		Swing		+1.72	
Source: Elections Canada

2015 Canadian federal election
Party	Candidate	Votes	%	±%	Expenditures
New Democratic	Scott Duvall	18,146	35.89	-12.55	$57,552.86
Liberal	Shaun Burt	16,933	33.49	+17.85	$45,580.19
Conservative	Al Miles	12,991	25.70	-6.59	$34,537.26
Green	Raheem Aman	1,283	2.54	-0.29	$226.00
Libertarian	Andrew James Caton	763	1.51	–	–
Christian Heritage	Jim Enos	438	0.87		$5,372.31
Total valid votes/Expense limit		50,554	100.00		$209,945.37
Total rejected ballots		307	0.60	–	
Turnout		50,861	65.15		
Eligible voters		76,886			
New Democratic hold		Swing		-15.20	
Source: Elections Canada

2011 federal election redistributed results
Party	Vote	%
New Democratic	21,806	48.45
Conservative	14,534	32.29
Liberal	7,040	15.64
Green	1,271	2.82
Others	358	0.80

2011 Canadian federal election
Party	Candidate	Votes	%	±%	Expenditures
New Democratic	Chris Charlton	25,595	47.2	+3.5	
Conservative	Terry Anderson	17,936	33.1	+2.4	
Liberal	Marie Bountrogianni	8,787	16.2	-4.0	
Green	Stephen Brotherson	1,505	2.8	-2.7	
Christian Heritage	Jim Enos	270	0.5	–	
Independent	Henryk Adamiec	171	0.3	–	
Total valid votes		54,264	100.0		
Total rejected ballots		261	0.5	+0.4	
Turnout		54,525	61.8	–	
Eligible voters		88,196	–	–	
Source: Elections Canada.

2008 Canadian federal election
Party	Candidate	Votes	%	±%	Expenditures
New Democratic	Chris Charlton	22,796	43.7	+6.3	$79,793
Conservative	Terry Anderson	16,010	30.7	+3.5	$58,663
Liberal	Tyler Banham	10,531	20.2	-11.7	$78,883
Green	Stephen Brotherston	2,884	5.5	+2.9	$7,683
Total valid votes/Expense limit		52,221	100.0	$91,117	
Total rejected ballots		293	0.1		
Turnout		52,514			
Source: Elections Canada.

2006 Canadian federal election
Party	Candidate	Votes	%	±%
New Democratic	Chris Charlton	21,869	37.3	+4.4
Liberal	Bill Kelly	18,697	31.9	-2.9
Conservative	Don Graves	15,915	27.2	-2.1
Green	Susan Wadsworth	1,510	2.6	0.0
Christian Heritage	Stephen Downey	458	0.8	
Marxist–Leninist	Paul Lane	131	0.2	-0.2
Total valid votes		58,580	100.0	
Source: Elections Canada.

2004 Canadian federal election
Party	Candidate	Votes	%	±%
Liberal	Beth Phinney	18,548	34.8	-16.1
New Democratic	Chris Charlton	17,552	32.9	+23.0
Conservative	Tom Jackson	15,590	29.3	-9.3
Green	Jo Pavlov	1,378	2.6	
Marxist–Leninist	Paul Lane	214	0.4	-0.2
Total valid votes		53,282	100.0	
Source: Elections Canada.

Note: Conservative vote is compared to the total of the Canadian Alliance vote and Progressive Conservative vote in 2000 election.

2000 Canadian federal election
Party	Candidate	Votes	%	±%
Liberal	Beth Phinney	22,536	50.9	+5.1
Alliance	Mike Scott	9,621	21.7	+4.1
Progressive Conservative	John Smith	7,467	16.9	-2.4
New Democratic	James Stephenson	4,387	9.9	-6.2
Marxist–Leninist	Rolf Gerstenberger	259	0.6	+0.3
Total valid votes		44,270	100.0	

Note: Canadian Alliance vote is compared to the Reform vote in 1997 election.

1997 Canadian federal election
Party	Candidate	Votes	%	±%
Liberal	Beth Phinney	21,128	45.8	-11.3
Progressive Conservative	John Smith	8,877	19.2	+7.8
Reform	Richard F. Gaasenbeek	8,154	17.7	-3.9
New Democratic	Chris Charlton	7,440	16.1	8.4
Canadian Action	Christopher M. Patty	374	0.8	
Marxist–Leninist	Iqbal Sumbal	146	0.3	
Total valid votes		46,119	100.0	

1993 Canadian federal election
Party	Candidate	Votes	%	±%
Liberal	Beth Phinney	27,218	57.1	+24.2
Reform	Craig Chandler	10,297	21.6	
Progressive Conservative	Tamra Mann	5,474	11.5	-19.0
New Democratic	Andrew MacKenzie	3,670	7.7	-25.1
National	Gunter Hinz	673	1.4	
Natural Law	Isabel Millman	331	0.7	
Total valid votes		47,663	100.0	

1988 Canadian federal election
Party	Candidate	Votes	%	±%
Liberal	Beth Phinney	16,934	32.9	-5.9
New Democratic	Marion Dewar	16,861	32.8	-10.6
Progressive Conservative	Grant Darby	15,712	30.5	+14.6
Christian Heritage	Charles Eleveld	1,799	3.5	
Commonwealth of Canada	Ed Gardner	87	0.2	
Independent	Rolf Gerstenberger	70	0.1	
Total valid votes		51,463	100.0	

Canadian federal by-election, 20 July 1987
Party	Candidate	Votes	%	±%
Resignation of Ian Deans, 31 August 1986
New Democratic	Marion Dewar	14,435	43.4	-5.8
Liberal	Beth Phinney	12,903	38.8	+20.6
Progressive Conservative	Dan MacDonald	5,301	15.9	-16.5
Rhinoceros	Martin O'Hanlon	316	0.9	
Independent	John Turmel	166	0.5	
Social Credit	Andrew Varady	149	0.4	
Total valid votes		33,270	100.0	

1984 Canadian federal election
Party	Candidate	Votes	%	±%
New Democratic	Ian Deans	25,789	49.2	+13.7
Progressive Conservative	Duncan M. Beattie	17,004	32.4	-0.1
Liberal	Jerry McCullough	9,514	18.1	-13.7
Commonwealth of Canada	Mike McGee	133	0.3	
Total valid votes		52,440	100.0	

1980 Canadian federal election
Party	Candidate	Votes	%	±%
New Democratic	Ian Deans	17,700	35.5	+11.5
Progressive Conservative	Duncan M. Beattie	16,208	32.5	-9.3
Liberal	Gus MacFarlane	15,873	31.8	-2.1
Communist	Elizabeth Rowley	65	0.1	
Marxist–Leninist	Gerard Kimmons	57	0.1	0.0
Total valid votes		49,903	100.0	

1979 Canadian federal election
Party	Candidate	Votes	%	±%
Progressive Conservative	Duncan M. Beattie	21,348	41.2	+6.4
Liberal	Gus MacFarlane	17,334	33.9	-10.0
New Democratic	Andy Asselin	12,273	24.0	+3.7
Communist	Elizabeth Rowley	102	0.2	-0.1
Marxist–Leninist	Gerard Kimmons	68	0.1	0.0
Total valid votes		51,125	100.0	

1974 Canadian federal election
Party	Candidate	Votes	%	±%
Liberal	Gus MacFarlane	22,253	43.9	+10.9
Progressive Conservative	Duncan M. Beattie	17,922	35.3	-5.6
New Democratic	Don Gray	10,304	20.3	-5.4
Communist	Nancy McDonald	170	0.3	
Marxist–Leninist	Dawn Carroll	69	0.1	
Total valid votes		50,718	100.0	

1972 Canadian federal election
Party	Candidate	Votes	%	±%
Progressive Conservative	Duncan M. Beattie	21,713	41.0	+16.5
Liberal	Harvey Lanctot	17,477	33.0	-8.2
New Democratic	Bill Nichols	13,604	25.7	-8.7
Social Credit	Roger Hamelin	183	0.3	
Total valid votes		52,977	100.0	

1968 Canadian federal election
Party	Candidate	Votes	%
Liberal	Gordon J. Sullivan	17,794	41.2
New Democratic	William D. Howe	14,838	34.3
Progressive Conservative	Duncan Beattie	10,583	24.5
Total valid votes		43,215	100.0

== See also ==
- List of Canadian electoral districts
- Historical federal electoral districts of Canada
