= Ian Deans =

Canadian politician (1937–2016)

Member of Parliament for Hamilton Mountain
- In office 18 February 1980 – 31 August 1986
- Preceded by: Duncan Beattie
- Succeeded by: Marion Dewar

Ontario MPP
- In office 17 October 1967 – 1 February 1979
- Preceded by: Don Ewen
- Succeeded by: Colin Isaacs
- Constituency: Wentworth

Personal details
- Born: 16 August 1937 Kilmarnock, Scotland
- Died: 3 May 2016 (aged 78) Hamilton, Ontario, Canada
- Party: New Democrat
- Spouse(s): June Deans (née Bateman); Diane Deans (div.)
- Occupation: Firefighter; draftsman

Ian Deans (16 August 1937 – 3 May 2016) was a Scottish-Canadian politician. He was a New Democratic member of the Legislative Assembly of Ontario from 1967 to 1979 and was a member of the House of Commons of Canada from 1980 to 1986.

== Background ==
Deans was born in Kilmarnock, Scotland. He moved to Canada as a youth and found work as a firefighter. He met his wife, Diane, when she was a staffer on Parliament Hill. He helped her launch her own political career as an Ottawa-area city councillor. The couple were married for 22 years before divorcing. Afterwards, Deans moved back to the Hamilton area.

Deans died in Hamilton, Ontario on May 3, 2016, at the age of 78.

== Politics ==
=== Provincial ===
He was elected to the Legislative Assembly of Ontario as a New Democratic Member in the 1967 provincial election representing the Hamilton area riding of Wentworth.

In 1970, he favoured a resolution that would force The Waffle, a radical left-wing group within the party, to be expelled. Deans objected to the organization because it recruited its own members, raised its own funds, and created its own policy, called 'The Manifesto'. He said, "You then become a political organization unto yourself." The resolution passed at an NDP convention in 1972. In 1970, Deans broke with most of his colleagues by expressing support for Prime Minister Pierre Trudeau's implementation of the War Measures Act during the FLQ Crisis.

In 1978, he ran in the Ontario NDP leadership convention to succeed Stephen Lewis. Deans' earlier support for the War Measures Act became a point of contention and he recanted his position saying he was wrong and had regretted it ever since. Initially projected to be the front runner, he lost by less than 200 votes to Michael Cassidy. Deans resigned from the legislature the next year.

=== Federal ===
Deans moved to federal politics and won a seat in the House of Commons of Canada during the 1980 federal election representing Hamilton Mountain.

He served as House Leader for the New Democratic Party during the illness of Stanley Knowles, and became official House Leader following the 1984 federal election.

In the fall of 1986, he surprised colleagues by resigning from parliament to accept an appointment by Progressive Conservative Prime Minister Brian Mulroney as head of the Public Service Staff Relations Board, a position Deans went on to hold for 10 years.

In 2007, Deans returned to politics and was acclaimed as the federal NDP's candidate in Brant. However, due to the onset of Parkinson's disease, he dropped out of the race.

=== Municipal ===
In 2010, Deans said in an interview that he might run in the Hamilton Municipal Election in 2010 if his Parkinson's hasn't progressed any farther. On September 2, 2010, he announced he would be running for mayor of Hamilton in the 2010 Municipal Election. He was quoted as saying, "The current city council 'a laughing stock' that has made it impossible to sell anything to do with Hamilton." At the last minute, he changed his mind, withdrew from the Mayoral race and ran instead for the position of Ward 2 (Downtown) Councillor in a field of 20 candidates after the incumbent councillor, Bob Bratina, decided to run for Mayor. Deans finished in eighth place with 231 votes (3%).
