= Steve Oneschuk =

Canadian footballer

Profile
- Position: Halfback

Personal information
- Born: November 30, 1930; St. Catharines, Ontario
- Died: April 20, 1996 (aged 65); Hamilton, Ontario
- Listed height: 5 ft 11 in (1.80 m)
- Listed weight: 180 lb (82 kg)

Career history
- 1955–1960: Hamilton Tiger-Cats

Awards and highlights
- Grey Cup champion (1957)

Steve Oneschuk (November 30, 1930 – April 20, 1996) was a Canadian professional football player who played for the Hamilton Tiger-Cats. He won the Grey Cup with them in 1957. He previously played football at and attended the University of Toronto. Oneschuk was later a renowned wood carver. He died in 1996.
