= Gordon J. Sullivan =

Canadian politician (1920–2011)

Member of the Canadian Parliament for Hamilton Mountain
- In office June 25, 1968 – December 29, 1972
- Preceded by: district created
- Succeeded by: Duncan Beattie

Personal details
- Born: January 20, 1920
- Died: October 7, 2011 (aged 91)
- Party: Liberal Party of Canada
- Profession: lawyer, judge

Gordon Joseph Sullivan (January 20, 1920 – October 7, 2011) was the Liberal MP for the riding of Hamilton Mountain from 1968 until 1972. He was a lawyer and judge by profession.

Sullivan was a vocal opponent of abortion. He voted against his own government's omnibus bill to update the Canadian criminal code in 1969, because he disagreed with its provision to liberalize the country's abortion laws. After retirement he was appointed judge at Wentworth County,

Preceded by riding created	Member of Parliament for Hamilton Mountain; 1968-1972	Succeeded by Duncan Beattie, PC
