= Duncan Beattie =

Canadian politician

Member of the Canadian Parliament for Hamilton Mountain
- In office 1979–1980
- Preceded by: Gus MacFarlane
- Succeeded by: Ian Deans
- In office 1972–1974
- Preceded by: Gordon Sullivan
- Succeeded by: Gus MacFarlane

Personal details
- Born: July 7, 1929 (age 96) Banknock, Falkirk, Scotland
- Party: Progressive Conservative Party of Canada
- Profession: insurance executive, businessman

Duncan Beattie (born July 7, 1929) was the Progressive Conservative Member of the Canadian House of Commons for the riding of Hamilton Mountain in Ontario from 1972 to 1974 and again from 1979 to 1980.

He served as a team manager for Hamilton Steelers in the National Soccer League, and Eastern Canada Professional Soccer League from 1960 til 1964.
