= List of corporations based in Mississauga =

This is a list of large and international corporations with Canadian headquarters in Mississauga, Ontario, Canada. Companies founded or based in Mississauga are also included.

== Companies founded or based in Mississauga ==
- Alectra
- Atomic Energy of Canada Limited
- Bell Mobility
- Canada Dry Motts
- Candu Energy Inc.
- Carrier Enterprise Canada
- East Side Mario's
- EllisDon
- First Choice Haircutters
- goeasy
- Grocery Gateway
- Hatch Ltd
- Heys International Ltd., relocated from Toronto in 2009
- Highland Farms
- IMAX Corporation
- Kelseys Original Roadhouse
- Laura Secord Chocolates
- Maple Leaf Foods
- Metroland Media Group
- Molly Maid
- Morguard
- MY-IVVI
- Natura Market
- Our Kids Media
- Pressure Pipe Inspection Company
- Purolator Inc.
- Softron
- Second Cup
- Shaw Broadcast Services
- The Shopping Channel
- TST-CF Express
- Winners

== Canadian headquarters of international Fortune 500 companies ==
- Abbott Laboratories
- ADM Milling
- Agilent Technologies
- Air Products Canada
- Alcoa Fastening Systems
- Amgen Canada
- Anixter Canada
- Ashland Canada
- AVNET International Canada
- Baxter Corporation
- Boston Scientific
- Chevron Texaco Lubricants
- Citi
- ConAgra Foods
- DuPont
- Eastman Chemical
- Ecolab
- Expeditors International
- Federal Express
- First Data
- General Electric
- General Mills
- Gilead Sciences
- Hershey
- Hewlett-Packard
- Honeywell
- Ingram Micro
- Kellogg
- Kimberly-Clark
- Konica Minolta
- Marriott Lodging
- Masco
- Mascot Truck Parts
- Mattel
- Medtronic
- Microsoft
- Moores
- NetSuite
- NCR
- Newell Rubbermaid
- Nissan
- Office Depot
- Oracle Corporation
- Paccar
- PepsiCo
- Pitney Bowes
- Praxair
- Prologis
- Ryder
- Sara Lee Coffee & Tea
- Sealed Air
- Sherwin-Williams
- Smurfit-MBI
- Staples
- Tech Data
- Thermo Fisher Scientific
- United Parcel
- Wal-Mart
- Wells Fargo
- Western Digital
- Whirlpool Corporation
- Wyeth Consumer Health Care
- YRC Logistics
