= Gordon Graydon Memorial Secondary School =

Coordinates: 43.5857°N 79.5727°W

Location
- 1490 Ogden Avenue; Mississauga, Ontario, L5E 2H8; Canada

Information
- Funding type: Public
- Motto: Palma Per Ardua (Success through Hard Work)
- Founded: 1956
- Closed: 2018
- School board: Peel District School Board
- Superintendent: Paul daSilva
- Principal: Jeff Schust
- Grades: 9 - 12
- Enrollment: 600 (September 2016)
- Language: English
- Colours: Green, Gold
- Mascot: The Hawk
- Team name: Graydon Hawks
- Website: http://schools.peelschools.org/sec/gordongraydon

Gordon Graydon Memorial Secondary School was a high school that served Grades 9 to 12 in Mississauga, Ontario, Canada. The school opened in 1957, celebrated its 50th anniversary on May 26, 2007 and closed in June 2018. It was named after Gordon Graydon, a Canadian politician who died in 1953.

== Closing ==
A report by school board staff proposed that the school be closed in June 2019.

On January 24, 2017, the Peel District School Boards Pupil Accommodation Review (PAR), voted in favour of the school closing in June 2018. In an effort to accommodate the students, Gordon Graydon's vocational and autism spectrum disorder (ASD) programs were relocated to Glenforest Secondary School for 2018-2019 school year. In addition, Graydon's graphic design and international business programs (GDM/IBT) were moved to T.L. Kennedy Secondary School for the 2018-2019 school year. Construction at both T.L. Kennedy and Glenforest secondary schools were needed to accommodate the incoming students. In December 2020 the Mississauga Continuing and Adult Education Centre moved into the former Gordon Graydon Memorial Secondary School building.

Gordon Graydon M.S.S. circa 2017

== Notable alumni ==
- Deborah Chow, filmmaker, director, screenwriter
- Rodrigo Leal, actor, model

== See also ==
- List of high schools in Ontario
