= Pressure Pipe Inspection Company =

- Founded: 1997
- Headquarters: Mississauga, Ontario, Canada

The Pressure Pipe Inspection Company (PPIC) is a supplier of large-diameter water and wastewater pipeline condition assessment and leak-detection services in Mississauga, Ontario. It specializes in identifying damaged pipeline sections to protect infrastructure investment, locate leaks, reduce risk and ensure environmental compliance. Its services include:

- Prestressed Concrete Cylinder Pipe (PCCP) condition assessment
- Metallic pipe condition assessment
- Plastic and PVC pipe condition assessment
- Leak detection
- New pipeline commissioning
- Pipeline locating and mapping
- Wastewater force main condition assessment

== History ==
The Pressure Pipe Inspection Company was established by Dr. Brian Mergelas in 1997 after he received his Ph.D. in physics at Queen's University in Kingston, Ontario, Canada. During his time at the university, he studied under Professor David Atherton, who would help steer Mergelas toward his future career.

In the late 1980s, Atherton had been approached by the water sector to examine some challenges with large diameter pre-stressed pipe rupturing, along with corrosion on the pre-stressing wires. Atherton was asked to act as an international expert in pipeline inspection technology to determine if something could be done to inspect the distressed water pipe. From there, Atherton began research and developed a new technology called Remote Field Transformer Coupling (RFTC). RFTC offered water supply system managers information on the location, distribution and number of wire breaks in their pipeline infrastructure.

While Mergelas was working on his degree, he studied technologies pertaining to the oil and gas sector and performed pipeline inspection work for oil and gas transmission pipelines. However, Mergelas eventually shifted his interests to water pipeline inspection after he became intrigued by the opportunities the industry and Atherton's RFTC technology presented. With RFTC as a base, Mergelas began PPIC in 1997 as a means to help utilities assess the condition of their infrastructure in hopes to preserve pipelines, save money and retain valuable water resources.

== Acquisition by Pure Technologies ==
On August 13, 2010, Pure Technologies Ltd. (“Pure”) (TSX:PUR) announced that it had concluded the purchase of The Pressure Pipe Inspection Company ("PPIC") for up to CAD$34.9 million in cash and common stock of Pure. Pure Technologies Ltd. is an international asset management technology and services company which has developed patented technologies for inspection, monitoring and management of critical infrastructure.

On November 1, 2018, Pure Technologies Ltd. (“Pure”) (TSX:PUR) announced that it had concluded a sale of the company to Xylem Inc. for CAD $9.00 per share in cash, representing an enterprise value of CAD$509 million, or US$397 million.
