= Natura Market =

Canadian e-commerce retailer

- Company type: Private
- Industry: E-commerce
- Founder: Shakzod Khabibov
- Headquarters: Mississauga, Ontario, Canada
- Revenue: $19,000,000 (2021)
- Website: https://naturamarket.ca/

Natura Market is a Canadian e-commerce health and wellness e-commerce retailer based in Mississauga, Ontario, offering natural foods and personal care and household products.

== History ==
Natura Market was founded in 2016 by Shakzod Khabibov. The company is Whole30-approved.

Natura Market grew during the lockdowns and stay-at-home orders of the COVID-19 pandemic, resulting in $19M in revenue for the 12-month period ending September 30, 2021. The retailer carries varies American brands for the Canadian market, including Nutpods, Kettle & Fire, Siete Family Foods, and Primal Kitchen.

In October 2021, Natura Market sold a majority stake to Freshii Inc., a healthy fast-casual restaurant chain in Canada. Matthew Corin, CEO and founder of Freshii, became the chairman of the board of directors, while Shakzod Khabibov remained the president and continued running the company. In August 2024, Revive Superfoods acquired Natura Market.
