= Cooksville Creek =

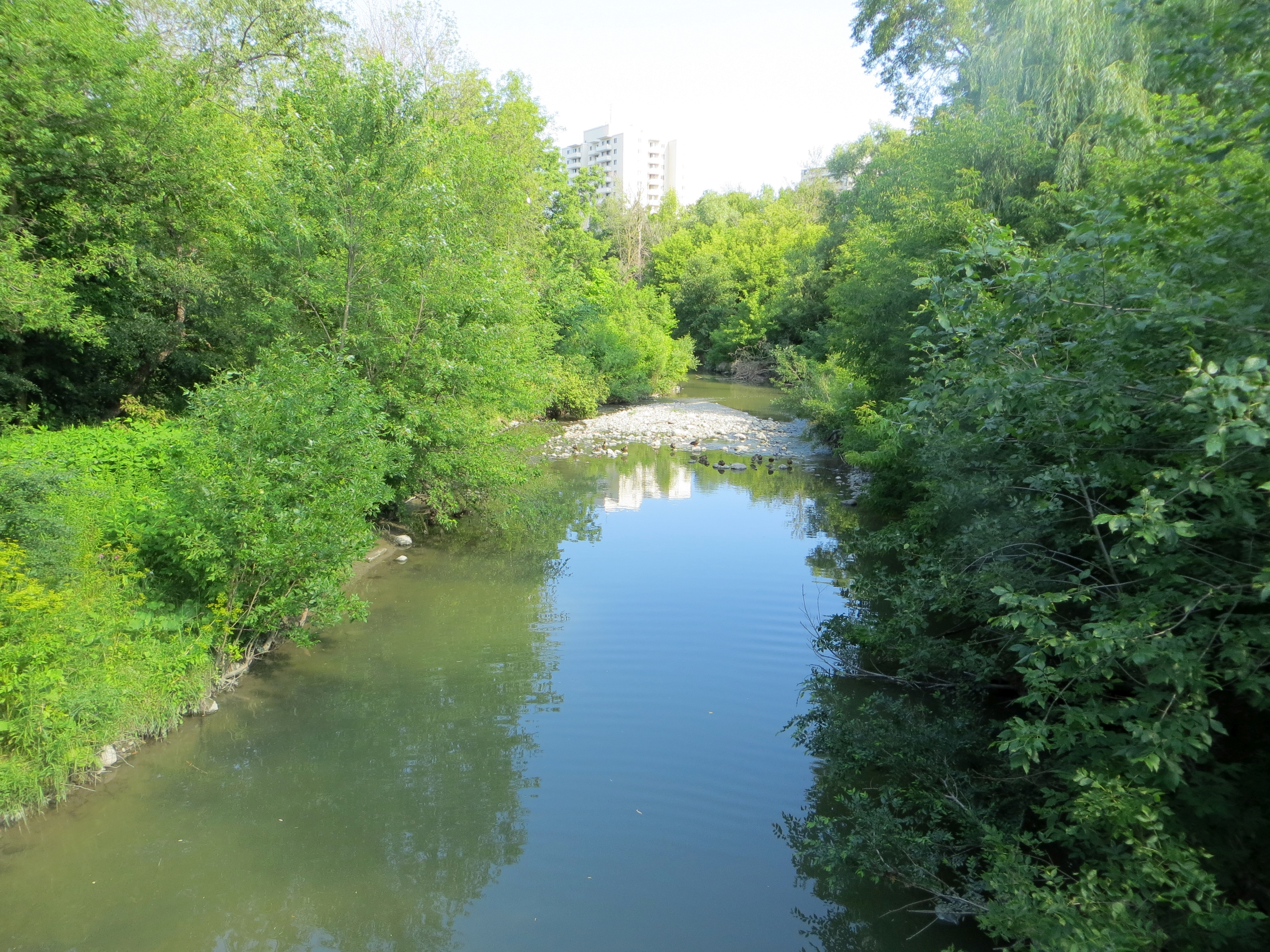
- Looking downstream from a pedestrian bridge just downstream of The Queensway

- Location of the mouth of Cooksville Creek in southern Ontario

Location
- Country: Canada
- Province: Ontario
- Region: Greater Toronto Area
- Regional Municipality: Peel
- Municipality: Mississauga

Physical characteristics
- Source
  - coordinates: 43°37′35″N 79°40′58″W
  - elevation: 183 m (600 ft)
- Mouth: Lake Ontario
  - coordinates: 43°33′53″N 79°33′55″W
  - elevation: 74 m (243 ft)
- Length: 16 km (9.9 mi)
- Basin size: 33.9 km^{2} (13.1 sq mi)

Basin features
- River system: Great Lakes Basin

Cooksville Creek is a short stream in Mississauga, Regional Municipality of Peel in the Greater Toronto Area of Ontario, Canada. It begins near Bristol Road West and Hurontario Street and flows south to Lake Ontario at R.K McMilian Park near Lakeshore Road and Cawthra Road. The community of Cooksville is located on the west bank of the creek near Hurontario Street and Dundas Street East. The creek is surrounded mostly by residential homes and a few parks:

- R.K. McMilian Park
- Camilla Park
- Cooksville Park
- R. Jones Park
- Mississauga Valley Park
- Stonebrook Park
- Woodington Green
- Kingsbridge Common

The drainage basin runs for 16 kilometres (9.9 mi), is about 2 kilometres (1.2 mi) wide, has a total area of 33.9 square kilometres (13.1 sq mi), and takes excess water from sanitary and storm sewers. 94% of the drainage basin is built over, and only 6% is open space.
