= Siete Foods =

American food company

Garza Food Ventures LLC
- Trade name: Siete Foods
- Company type: Subsidiary
- Industry: Snack food
- Founded: 2014; 12 years ago, in Laredo, Texas, USA
- Founder: Veronica Garza
- Owner: PepsiCo (2025–present)
- Website: www.sietefoods.com

Garza Food Ventures LLC, doing business as Siete Foods, is an American company founded in 2014 by Veronica Garza that makes nontraditional versions of traditional Mexican and Mexican-American ingredients and foods. According to Inc., it "created a category in grain-free and dairy-free Mexican American staples".

== History ==
The company was founded in Austin, Texas, in 2014 by Veronica Garza, who was diagnosed with autoimmune diseases while in high school and college. Her brother Roberto suggested she try avoiding grains, legumes, and dairy to see if that would help with her symptoms. She found that it did, and her entire family joined her in excluding these items, but all of these were common ingredients in Mexican, Mexican-American, and Tex-Mex cuisines that were a part of the family's typical meals. In particular tortillas, typically included in every meal in these cuisines, were missed.

Garza developed some recipes to create traditional items such as tortillas from nontraditional ingredients, such as almond flour, and started selling them from her home; eventually she was making 50 dozen tortillas in a weekend with the help of her family. In 2014 Austin's Wheatsville Food Co-op started carrying her products. By 2016 the products were being carried by Whole Foods. In Canada, e-commerce retailer Natura Market carries Siete products. According to Inc., the company "created a category in grain-free and dairy-free Mexican American staples".

Garza's parents and her four siblings are employees; the company's name, Siete, is the Spanish word for seven, a reference to the seven of them. In 2017, CEO Miguel Garza was named to Forbes' 30 under 30 list.

By 2022 the company was projected to have retail sales of US$250 million and was the fastest-growing Latino/Hispanic food brand in the United States. Forbes pointed out in 2018 that it had been decades since the category had a "challenger [brand] emerge", noting that Ortega was founded in 1897, Old El Paso in 1917, and Goya in 1936.

On October 1, 2024, PepsiCo announced it had entered an agreement to acquire the company. On January 17, 2025, it was announced that the transaction had been completed.

== Products ==
Products as of 2022 include tortillas, refried beans, tortilla chips, hard taco shells, cookies, seasoning mixes, and hot sauces in 60 stock-keeping units. In 2022 they also produced their first product containing corn, a tortilla chip in collaboration with Nixta, who are dedicated to traditional maize-based products and nixtamalization methods.

The company produced a cookbook, The Siete Table: Nourishing Mexican-American Recipes From Our Kitchen, in 2022.

== Juntos fund ==
The company operates a foundation that provides grants to small Latino/Hispanic food entrepreneurs.
