= Glenforest Secondary School =

Location
- 3575 Fieldgate Drive; Mississauga, Ontario, L4X 2J6; Canada; 43.6273°N 79.5928°W

Information
- Funding type: Public
- Motto: Offer the best, Expect the best, to be your best. (Participer, de respecter, de réaliser)
- Founded: 1969
- School board: Peel District School Board
- Superintendent: Jamie Robertson
- Area trustee: Lucas Alves; Rick Williams
- Principal: Fraser Kidd
- Grades: 9-12
- Enrolment: 1086 (March 18, 2021)
- Language: English
- Area: Mississauga
- Colours: Navy and Gold
- Mascot: Griffy
- Team name: Glenforest Gryphons
- Special programs: International Baccalaureate
- Website: glenforest.peelschools.org

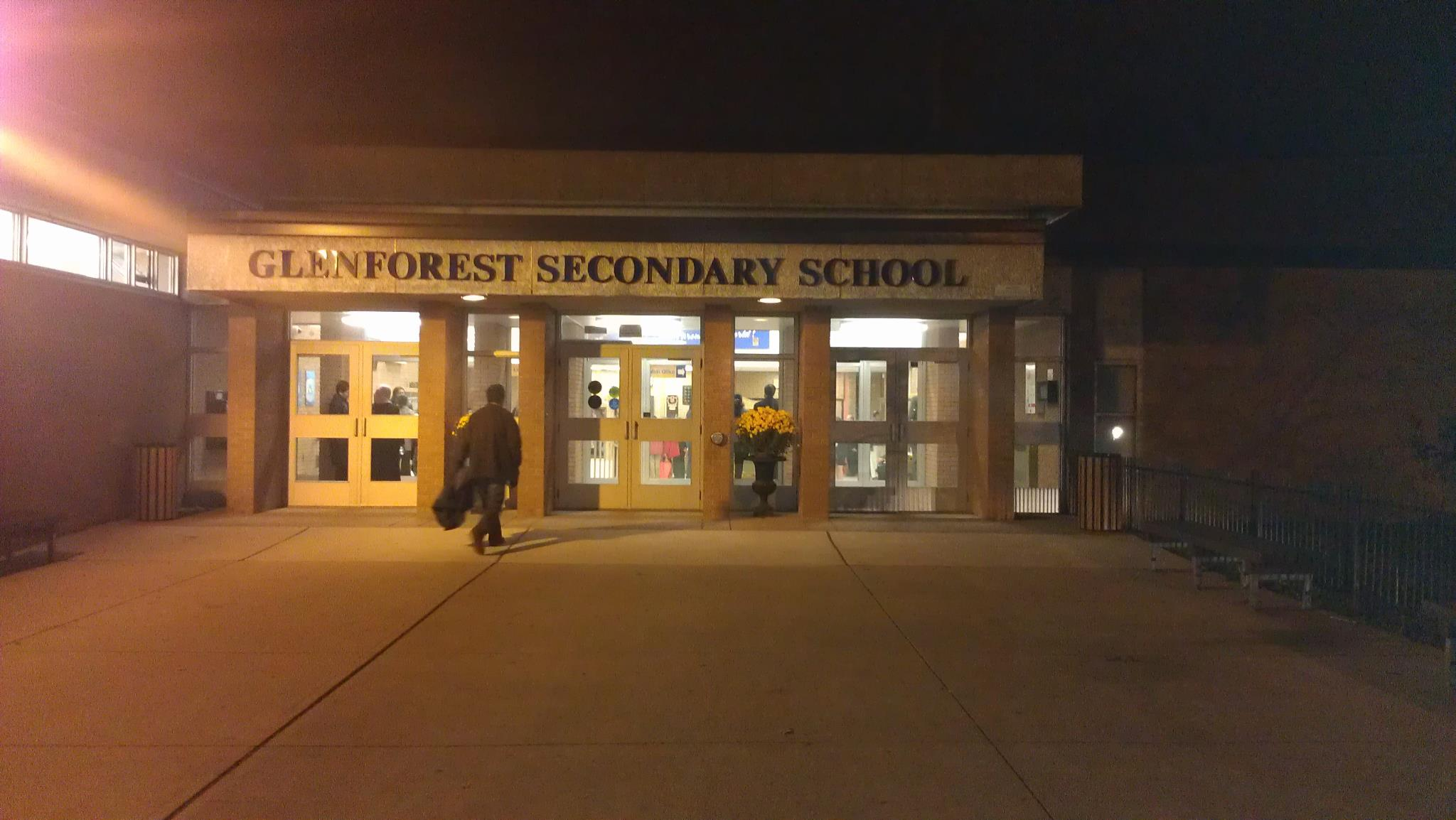
Glenforest SS as taken from its front entrance.

Glenforest Secondary School (GFSS) is a public secondary educational institution located in Mississauga, Ontario, Canada. Established in 1969, Glenforest Secondary School is a member of the Peel District School Board and offers an International Baccalaureate program. The school mascot is the mythological creature, the gryphon.

== Activities and facilities ==
In 2014, GFSS drama students performed an adaptation of Don Quixote. The school's indoor swimming pool, which it shared with the city, was demolished in 2024.

== Awards ==
Teacher Rachel Luke received the Prime Minister's Award for Teaching Excellence in science, technology, engineering and mathematics (STEM) in 2021.

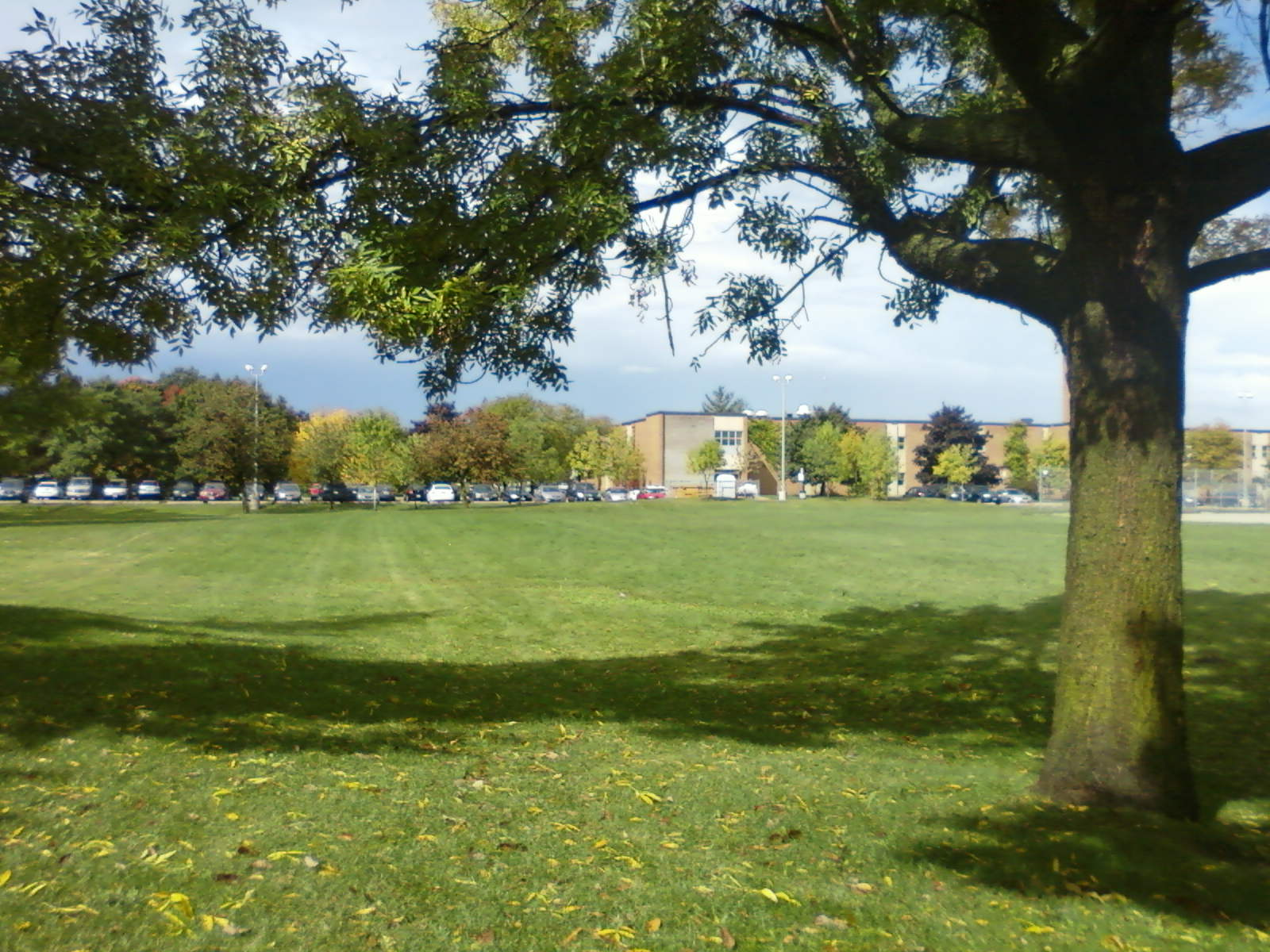

== See also ==
- Education in Ontario
- List of secondary schools in Ontario
