= Heys International Ltd. =

Heys International Ltd. is a Canadian multinational manufacturer and distributor of travel products. The company makes luggage, business cases, backpacks and travel accessories. Heys International Ltd. is privately owned company. It was founded in 1986 in the suburbs of Toronto, Canada, as a family business. The company is known for its fashionable and lightweight luggage made from a polycarbonate composite.

== Milestones ==
In 2003, Heys introduced the xCase, which claimed to be the world's lightest hard side carry-on luggage at the time.

In 2008, Heys introduced the xScale, a small portable luggage scale. In 2008, Heys introduced the EcoCase; it claimed it is made from 100% post-industrial recycled plastic.
