= Mississauga =

City in Ontario, Canada

- City (lower-tier)
- City of Mississauga
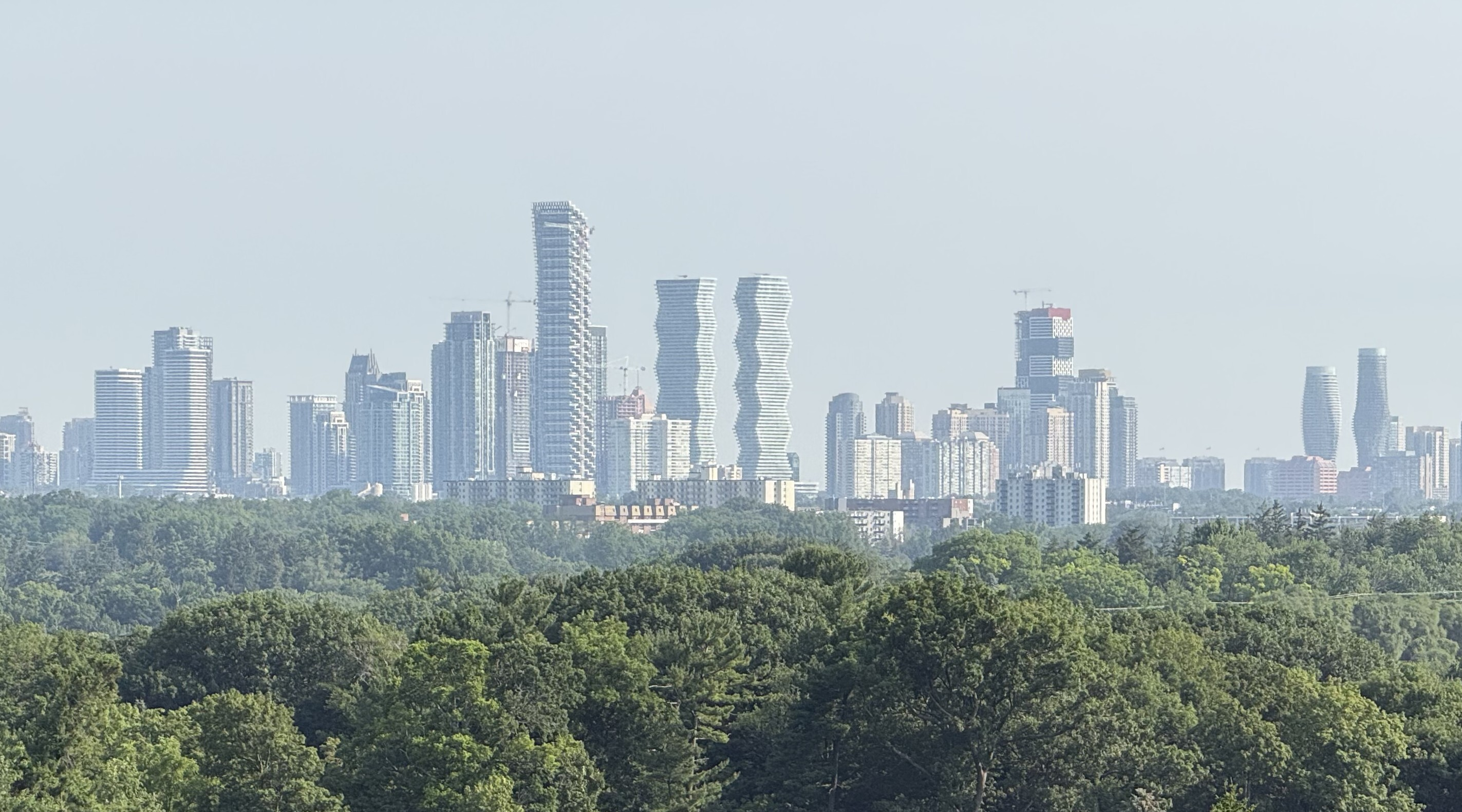
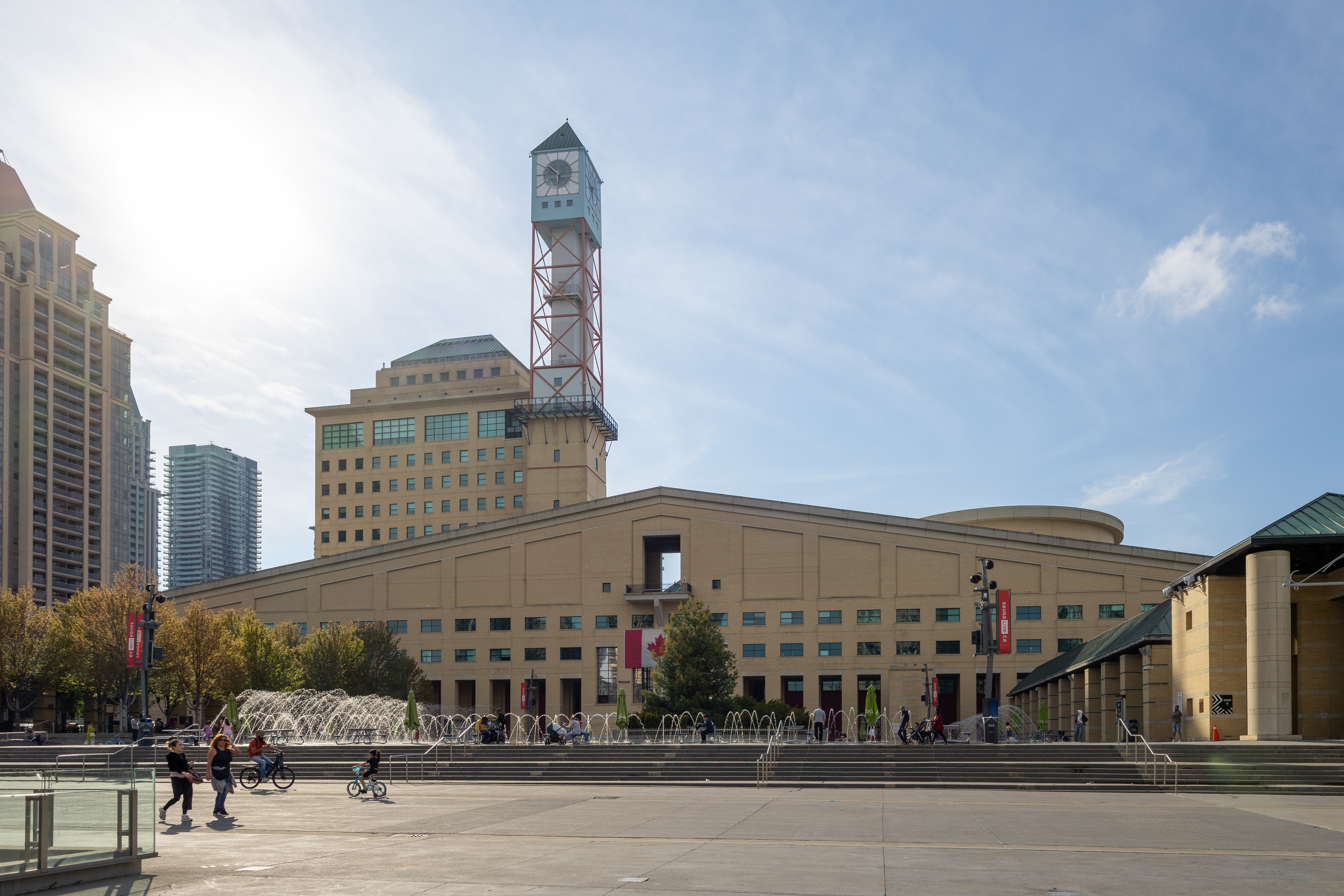
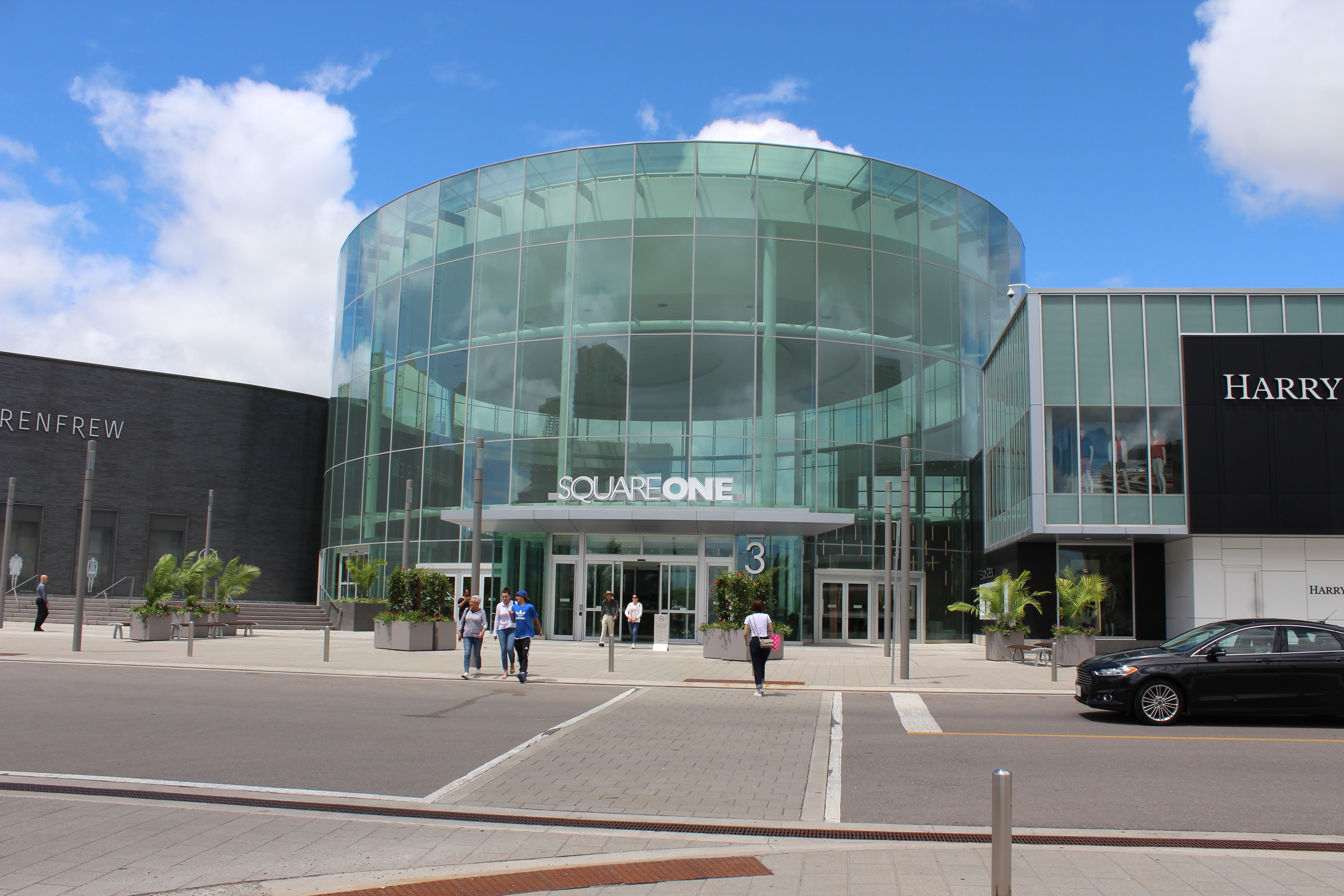
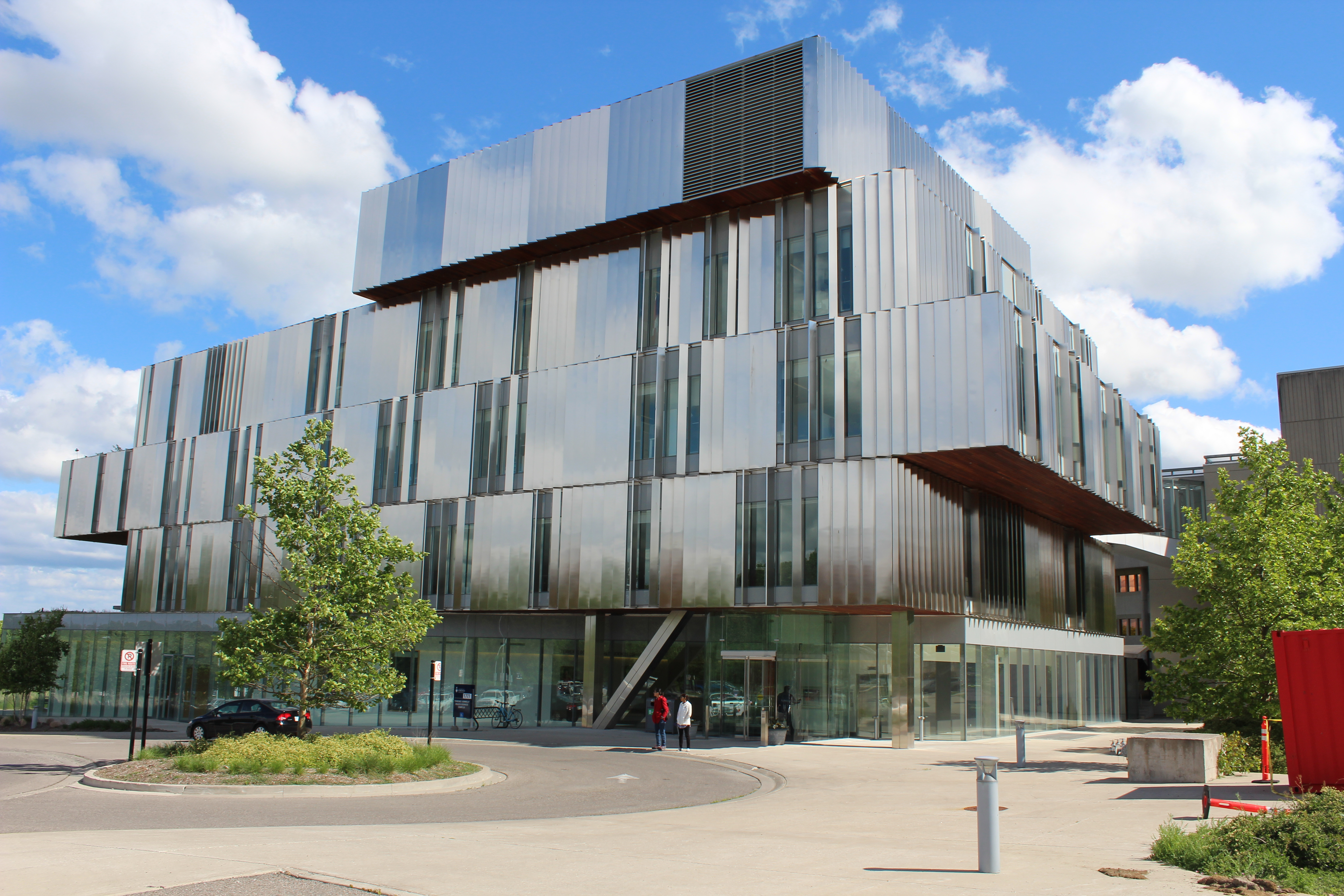
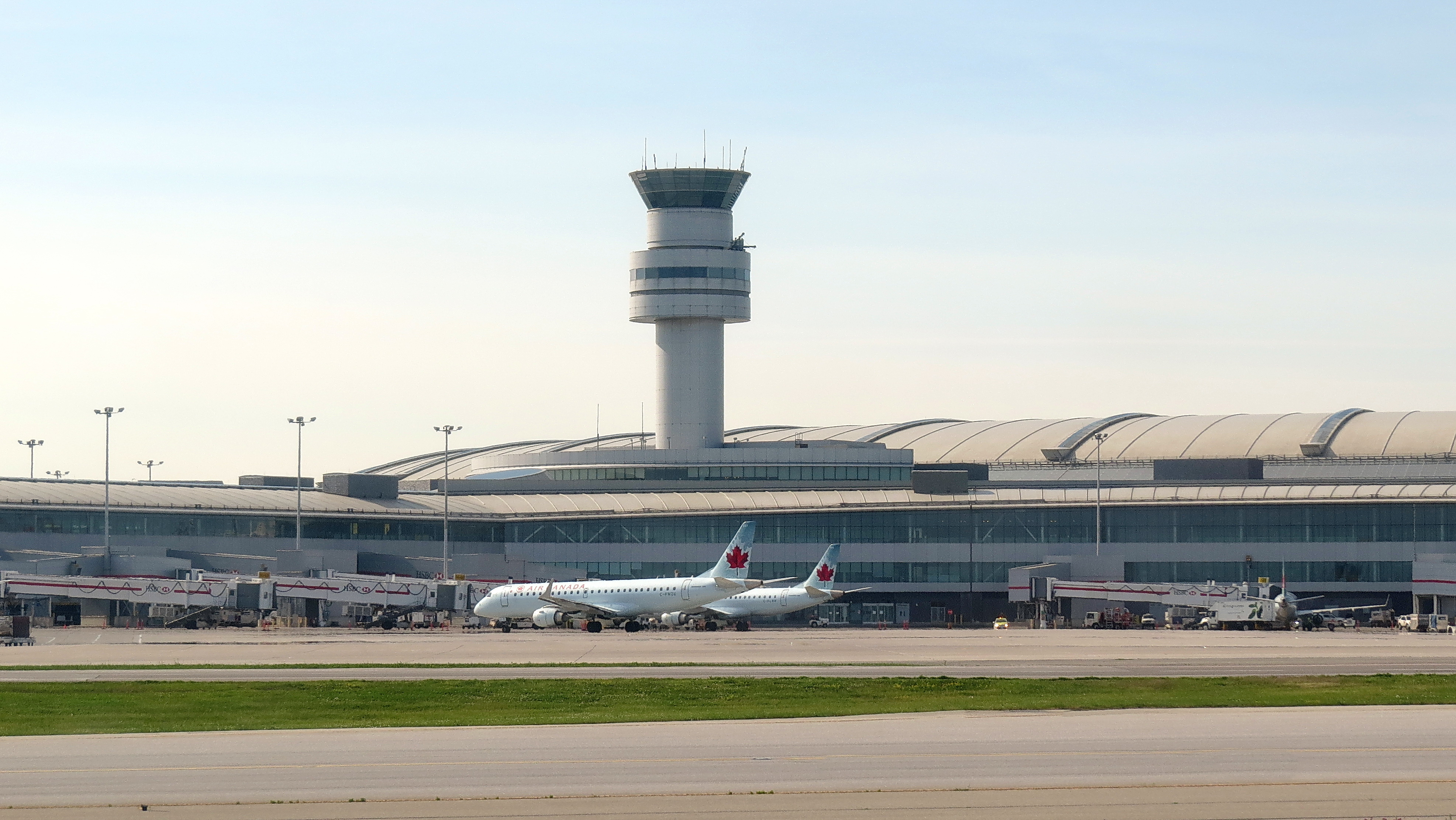
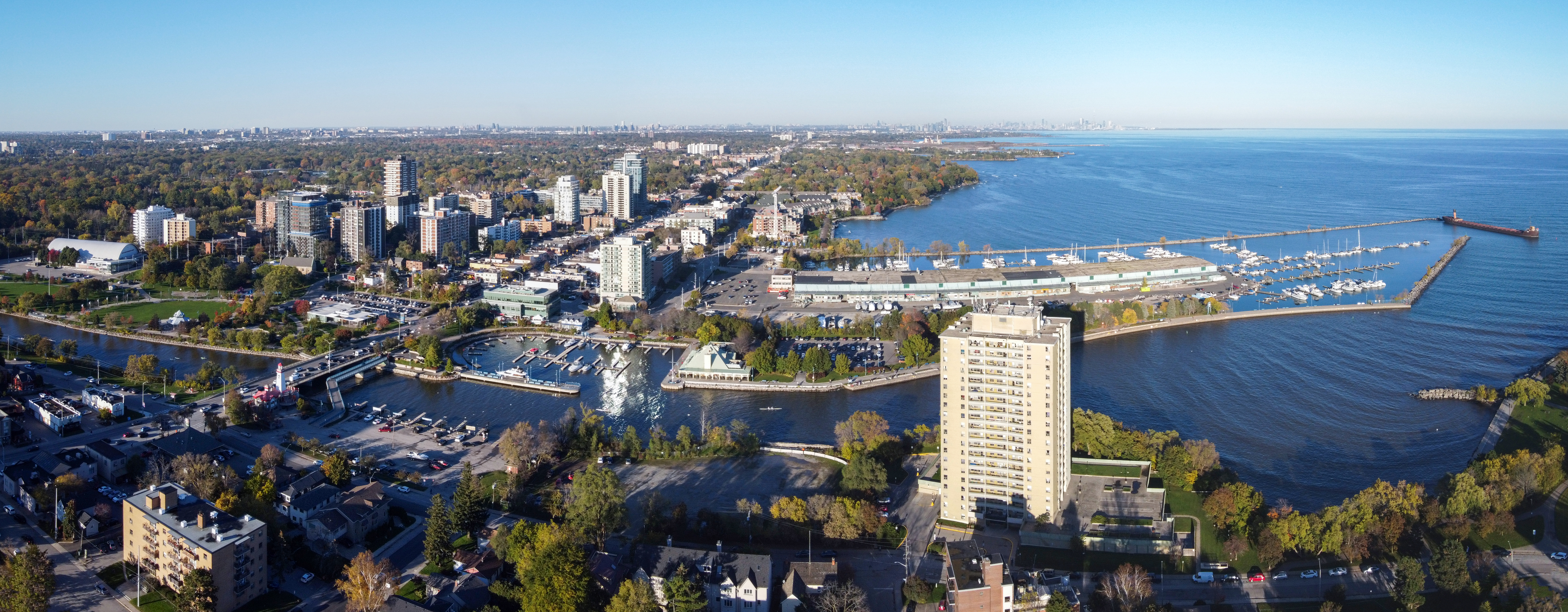
- Skyline of Mississauga City Centre Civic Centre and Celebration Square Square One Shopping Centre University of Toronto Mississauga Toronto Pearson International Airport Port Credit and the Credit River

- Flag Coat of arms Logo
- Nickname: "Sauga"
- Motto(s): Pride in our past, faith in our future Leading Today for Tomorrow
- Interactive map of Mississauga
- Location of Mississauga in Southern Ontario Mississauga (Regional Municipality of Peel)
- Coordinates: 43°36′N 79°39′W
- Country: Canada
- Province: Ontario
- Region: Peel
- Toronto Township: 1805
- Town of Mississauga: 1968
- Incorporation as the City of Mississauga: 1974

Government
  - Mayor: Alvin Tedjo
  - Governing Body: Mississauga City Council
  - MPs: List of MPs: Omar Alghabra (L); Peter Fonseca (L); Iqwinder Gaheer (L); Iqra Khalid (L); Charles Sousa (L); Rechie Valdez (L)
  - MPPs: List of MPPs: Deepak Anand (PC); Rudy Cuzzetto (PC); Natalia Kusendova (PC); Silvia Gualtieri (PC); Sheref Sabawy (PC); Nina Tangri (PC)

Area (2021)
  - Total: 292.43 km^{2} (112.91 sq mi)
- Elevation: 156 m (512 ft)

Population (2021)
  - Total: 717,961 (7th)
  - Density: 2,467.6/km^{2} (6,391/sq mi)
- Time zone: UTC−05:00 (EST)
  - Summer (DST): UTC−04:00 (EDT)
- Forward sortation area: L4T to L5W & M7R
- Area codes: 905, 289, 365, and 742
- Demonym: Mississaugan; Saugan; Mississauguese
- Website: www.mississauga.ca

Mississauga (Note: /ˌmɪsɪˈsɔːɡə/ MISS-ih-SAW-gə) is a city in Peel Region, Ontario, Canada. Situated on the northwestern shore of Lake Ontario, it borders Toronto (Etobicoke) to the east, Brampton to the north, Milton to the northwest, and Oakville to the southwest. With a population of 717,961 as of 2021, Mississauga is the seventh-most populous municipality in Canada, third largest city in Ontario, and second-most populous in the Greater Toronto Area after Toronto itself. However, for the first time in its history, the city's population declined according to the 2021 census, from a 2016 population of 721,599 to 717,961, a 0.5 per cent decrease.

The growth of Mississauga was initially attributed to its proximity to Toronto. However, during the latter half of the 20th century, the city attracted a diverse and multicultural population. Over time, it built up a transit-oriented central business district of its own: Mississauga City Centre. Malton, a neighbourhood of the city located in its northeast end, is home to Toronto Pearson International Airport, Canada's busiest airport, as well as the headquarters of many Canadian and multinational corporations. Mississauga is not a traditional city, but is instead an amalgamation of three former Ontario villages and two townships which contained a number of rural hamlets (a general pattern common to several suburban GTA cities) that were significant population centres, with none being clearly dominant, prior to the city's incorporation that later coalesced into a single urban area.

Indigenous people have lived in the area for thousands of years, and Mississauga is situated on the traditional territory of the Wendat, Haudenosaunee and Anishinaabeg people, including the namesake Mississaugas. Most of present-day Mississauga was founded in 1805 as Toronto Township within York County, and became part of Peel County when new counties were formed by splitting off parts of the original county in 1851. Mississauga itself was established in 1968 as a town, and was reincorporated as a city in 1974, when Peel was restructured into a regional municipality.

== Etymology ==
The name Mississauga comes from the Anishinaabe word Misi-zaagiing, meaning '[those at the] Great River-mouth'.

The city's residents are called Mississaugans. However, the city is commonly referred to as Sauga, and thus its residents are also called Saugans.

== History ==
=== Palaeo-Indigenous period (9000–8500 BCE) ===
A single site in Mississauga with Hi-Lo projectile points was registered in the Ontario Ministry of Culture database of archaeological sites. Lake Ontario was much smaller at this time, and sites from this period may be 500 m into the lake.

=== Archaic period (8000–1000 BCE) ===
The Mississauga area experienced population growth during this period. There are 23 known Archaic sites in Mississauga, mostly in the Credit River and Cooksville Creek drainage systems. People would congregate at rapids and the mouths of these rivers to catch fish during spawning runs. They would harvest nuts and wild rice at the wetland margins in the late summer. During the late Archaic period, large cemeteries were built.

=== Woodland period (1000 BCE – 1650 CE) ===
The growth in population beginning in the Archaic period continued into the Woodland period, with 23 known sites originating during this period. Pottery first appears during this period in the style of the Point Peninsula complex, and near the end of the Woodland period, the first semi-permanent villages appear. Artifacts show that these people engaged in long-distance trade, likely as part of the Hopewell tradition.

In the late Woodland period (500–1650 CE), "the band level of social organization that characterized earlier cultures gave way eventually to the tribal level of the Ontario Iroquoian Tradition," and people began cultivation of crops such as maize, beans, squash, sunflowers, and tobacco. This led to the development of the Iroquoian-speaking Wendat, or Huron, culture. The Lightfoot site with four to six longhouses was located on the Credit River near Mississauga's border with Brampton. Another village with many longhouses was on the Antrex site, located on a wide ridge bounded by two small tributaries of Cooksville Creek.

=== Arrival of the Haudenosaunee, the Anishinaabe, and the Europeans ===
Around the end of the Woodland period, the Haudenosaunee, another Iroquoian confederacy, began to move into the area, and, as part of a long conflict known as the Beaver wars, they had dispersed the Wendat by 1650. However, by 1687, the Haudenosaunee had abandoned their new settlements along the north shore of Lake Ontario.

The Algonquian-speaking Anishinaabe Ojibwe people had been aligned with the Wendat, and when they were dispersed, the Anishinaabe expanded eastward into the Credit River Valley area, clashing with the Haudenosaunee and eventually taking over when the Haudenosaunee retreated. The European traders would gather annually at the mouth of what is now known as the Credit River to give the Anishinaabe credit for the following year. "From this, the Mississauga bands at the western end of the lake became known collectively as the Credit River Mississaugas."

Toronto Township, consisting of most of present-day Mississauga, was formed on 2 August 1805 when officials from York (what is now the City of Toronto) purchased 340 km^{2} (85,000 acres) of land from the Mississaugas under Treaty 14. A second treaty was signed in 1818 that surrendered 2,622 km^{2} (1,012 sq mi) of Mississauga land to the British Crown. In total Mississauga is covered by four treaties: Treaty 14, Treaty 19, Treaty 22 and Treaty 23.

=== Founding of Settlements ===
Mississauga's original villages (and some later incorporated towns) settled included Clarkson, Cooksville, Dixie, Erindale (called Springfield until 1890), Lakeview, Lorne Park, Port Credit, Sheridan, and Summerville. The region became known as Toronto Township. Part of northeast Mississauga, including the Airport lands and Malton were a part of Toronto Gore Township.

After the land was surveyed, the Crown gave much of it in the form of land grants to United Empire Loyalists who emigrated from the Thirteen Colonies during and after the American Revolution, as well as loyalists from New Brunswick. A group of settlers from New York State arrived in the 1830s. The government wanted to compensate the Loyalists for property lost in the colonies and encourage development of what was considered frontier. In 1820, the government purchased additional land from the Mississaugas. Additional settlements were established, including: Barbertown, Britannia, Burnhamthorpe, Churchville, Derry West, Elmbank, Malton, Meadowvale (Village), Mount Charles, and Streetsville. European-Canadian settlement led to the eventual displacement of the Mississaugas. In 1847, the government relocated them to a reserve in the Grand River Valley, near present-day Hagersville. Pre-confederation, the Township of Toronto was formed as a local government; settlements within were not legal villages until much later.

=== Suburban growth and the creation of Mississauga ===
Except for small villages and some gristmills and brickworks served by railway lines, most of present-day Mississauga was agricultural land, including fruit orchards, through much of the 19th and first half of the 20th century. In the 1920s, cottages were constructed along the shores of Lake Ontario as weekend getaway homes for Torontonians.

The Queen Elizabeth Way (QEW) highway, one of the first controlled-access highways in the world, opened from Highway 27 to Highway 10 (Hurontario Street) in Port Credit, in 1935 and later expanded to Hamilton and Niagara in 1939.

In 1937, 1,410.8 acres of land was sold to build Malton Airport (which later became Pearson Airport). It became Canada's busiest airport which later put the end to the community of Elmbank.

The first prototypical suburban growth of Toronto Township began after World War II, Applewood Acres was the first major planned development near the QEW and Dixie Road, and urbanization soon rapidly expanded north and west. In 1952, Toronto Township annexed the southern portion of Toronto Gore Township. Two large new towns; Erin Mills and (New) Meadowvale, were started in 1968 and 1969, respectively. Most of Mississauga was built out by 2005.

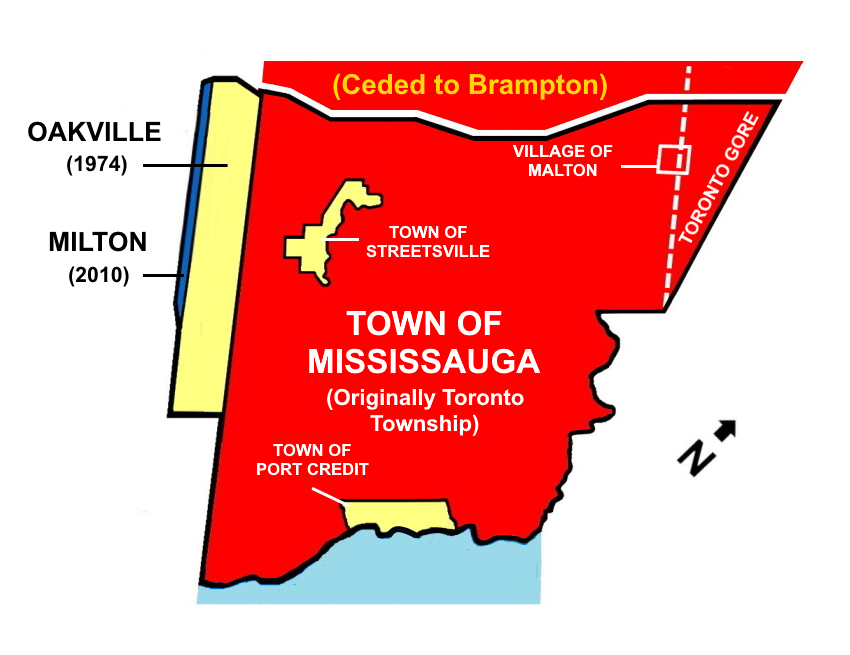
The areas amalgamated to create the present city: The Town of Mississauga (red), was created out of Toronto Township, which in 1952 annexed a portion of Toronto Gore Township (right of dashed white line). In 1968 (the year of its incorporation), the police village of Malton (white outline) was absorbed into it. The town became a city in 1974, and absorbed Port Credit, Streetsville, and a portion of Oakville (beige), but ceded the northern extremity (separated section of red at top) to Brampton. A final annexation occurred in 2010, when a thin strip of land was purchased from Milton (blue) to bring the city limits to Highway 407.

While the Township had many settlements within it, none of them (save for the larger enclave communities of Port Credit and Streetsville) were incorporated, and all residents were represented by a singular Township council (Malton had special status as a police village, allowing it partial autonomy). To reflect the community's shift away from rural to urban, council desired conversion into a town, and in 1965 a call for public input on naming it received thousands of letters offering hundreds of different suggestions. "Mississauga" was chosen by plebiscite over "Sheridan" by a vote of 11,796 to 4,331, and in 1968 the reincorporation went forward, absorbing Malton in the process. Port Credit and Streetsville remained separate, uninterested in ceding their autonomy or being taxed to the needs of a growing municipality. Political will, as well as a belief that a larger city would be a hegemony in Peel County, kept them as independent enclaves within the Town of Mississauga, but both were amalgamated into Mississauga when it reincorporated as a city in 1974. At this time, Mississauga annexed lands west of Winston Churchill Boulevard from Oakville in the northwest, (Note: The unannexed portion of northern Oakville became part of Milton on the same day) in exchange for lands in the northernmost extremity (which included Churchville) south of Steeles Avenue which were transferred to Brampton. That year, Square One Shopping Centre opened; it has since expanded several times.

On 10 November 1979, a 106-car freight train derailed on the CP rail line while carrying explosive and poisonous chemicals just north of the intersection of Mavis Road and Dundas Street. One of the tank cars carrying propane exploded, and since other tank cars were carrying chlorine, the decision was made to evacuate nearby residents. With the possibility of a deadly cloud of chlorine gas spreading through Mississauga, 218,000 people were evacuated. Residents were allowed to return home once the site was deemed safe. At the time, it was the largest peacetime evacuation in North American history. Due to the speed and efficiency with which it was conducted, many cities later studied and modelled their own emergency plans after Mississauga's. For many years afterwards, the name "Mississauga" was, for Canadians, associated with a major rail disaster.

The area's incumbent local exchange carrier, Bell Canada, splits the city into five pre-1970 rate centres – Clarkson, Cooksville, Malton, Port Credit, and Streetsville. However, they are combined as a single Mississauga listing in the phone book. The first Touch-Tone telephones in Canada were introduced in Malton on 15 June 1964.

On January 1, 2010, Mississauga bought land from the Town of Milton and expanded its border by 400 acres (1.6 km^{2}), to Highway 407, affecting 25 residents. Also in January 2010, the Mississaugas and the federal government settled a land claim, in which the band of Indigenous people received $145,000,000 as just compensation for their land and lost income.

== Geography ==
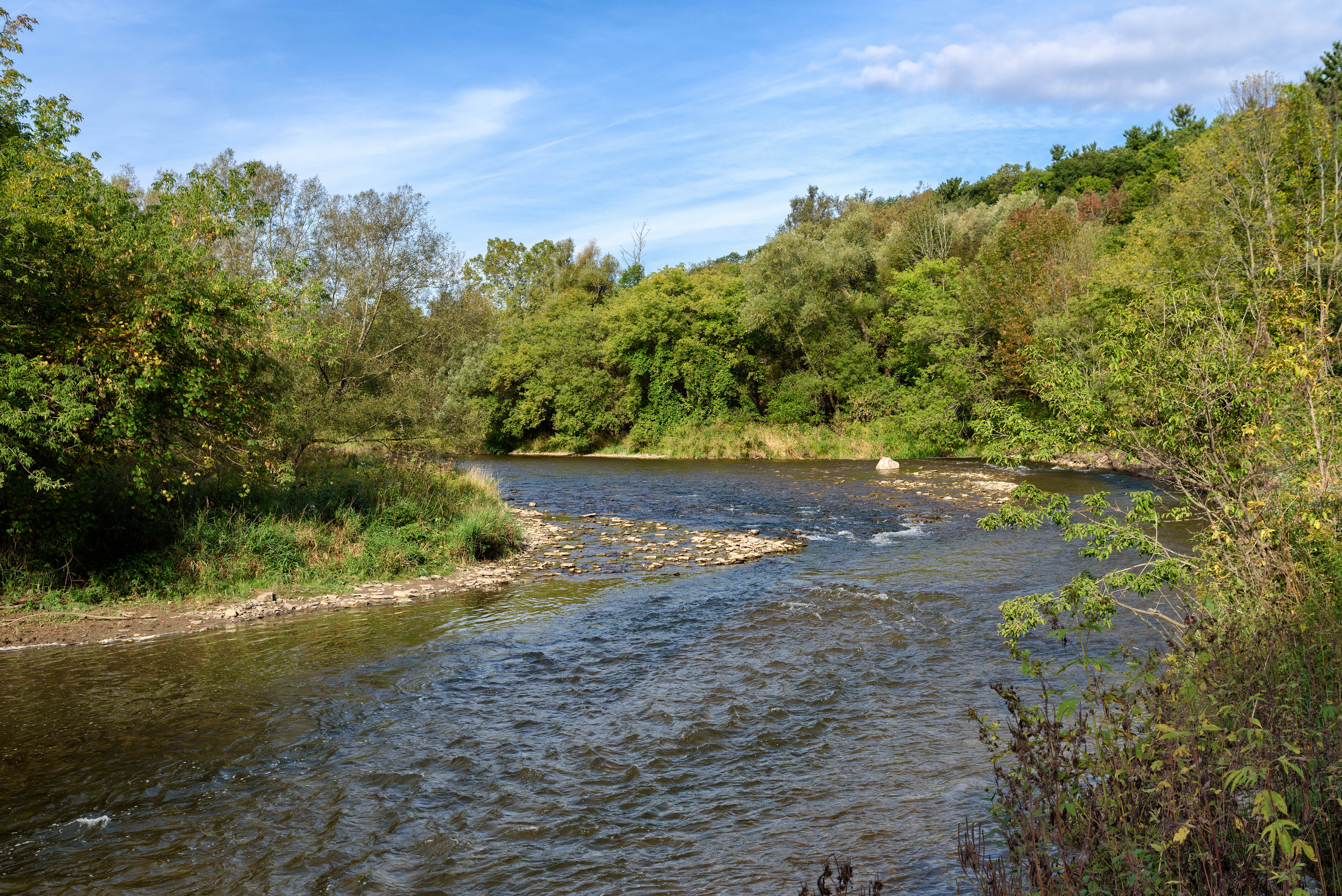
The Credit River

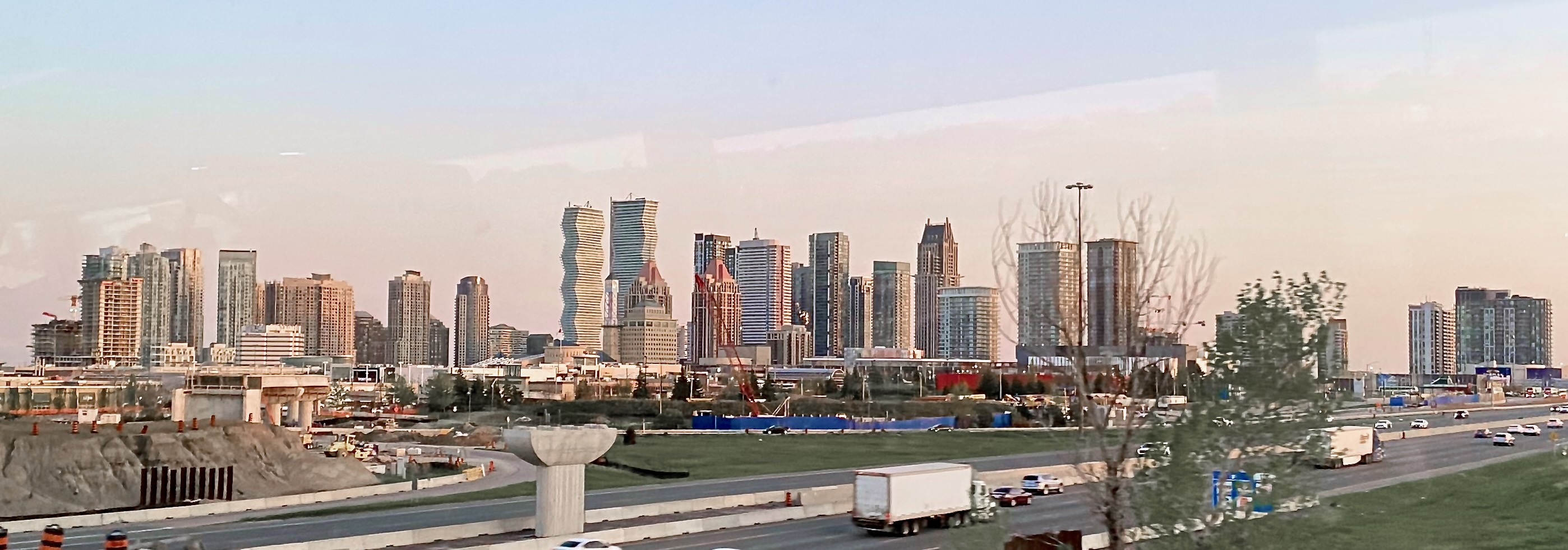
The Skyline of Mississauga, seen from Hurontario Street at Highway 403.

Mississauga covers 288.42 square kilometres (111.36 sq mi) of land, fronting 13 kilometres (8.1 mi) of shoreline on Lake Ontario.

Mississauga is bounded by Oakville and Milton to the west/southwest, Brampton to the north, Toronto to the east, and Lake Ontario to the south/south-east. Halton Hills borders Mississauga's north-west corner. With the exception of the southeast border with Toronto (Etobicoke Creek), Mississauga shares a land border with all previously mentioned municipalities.

Two major river valleys feed into the lake. The Credit River is by far the longest and has the greatest discharge. It divides the western side of Mississauga from the central/eastern portions and enters the lake at the Port Credit harbour. The indented, mostly forested valley was inhabited by First Nation peoples long before European exploration of the area. The valley is protected and maintained by the Credit Valley Conservation Authority (CVCA).

Etobicoke Creek forms part of the eastern border of Mississauga with the city of Toronto. North of there it passes through the western limits of Pearson Airport. There have been two aviation accidents, in 1978 and 2005, where aircraft overshot the runway and slid into the Etobicoke creek banks. In 1954, heavy flooding resulted in some homes along the riverbank being swept into the lake after heavy rains from Hurricane Hazel. Since that storm, houses are no longer constructed along the floodplain. The creek and its tributaries are administered by the Toronto and Region Conservation Authority (TRCA).

Most land in Mississauga drains to either of the two main river systems, with the exception of the smaller Mary Fix and Cooksville Creeks which run roughly through the centre of Mississauga entering the lake near Port Credit. Some small streams and reservoirs are part of the Sixteen Mile Creek system in the far north-west corner of the city, but these drain toward the lake in neighbouring Milton and Oakville.

The shoreline of former Glacial Lake Iroquois roughly follows the Dundas Street alignment, although it is not noticeable in some places but is more prominent in others, such as the site of the former brickyard (Shoreline Dr. near Mavis Rd.). The ancient shoreline promontory affords a clear view of downtown Toronto and Lake Ontario on clear days. The land in Mississauga ranges from a maximum elevation of 214 m (699 ft) above sea level in the far west near the Hwy. 407/401 junction, to a minimum elevation at the Lake Ontario shore of 76 m (249 ft) above sea level.

Apart from the embankments of the Credit River valley, its tributaries, and the Glacial Lake Iroquois shoreline, the only noticeable hills in Mississauga are actually part of the former Britannia Landfill, now a golf course on Terry Fox Way.

On August 17, 2024, heavy rainfalls caused localized flooding in areas across the city. The floods caused many traffic disruptions as well as dangerous road conditions and road closures. All creeks and rivers throughout Mississauga were either at full capacity or flooded into parks and greenspaces.

=== Neighbourhoods/areas ===
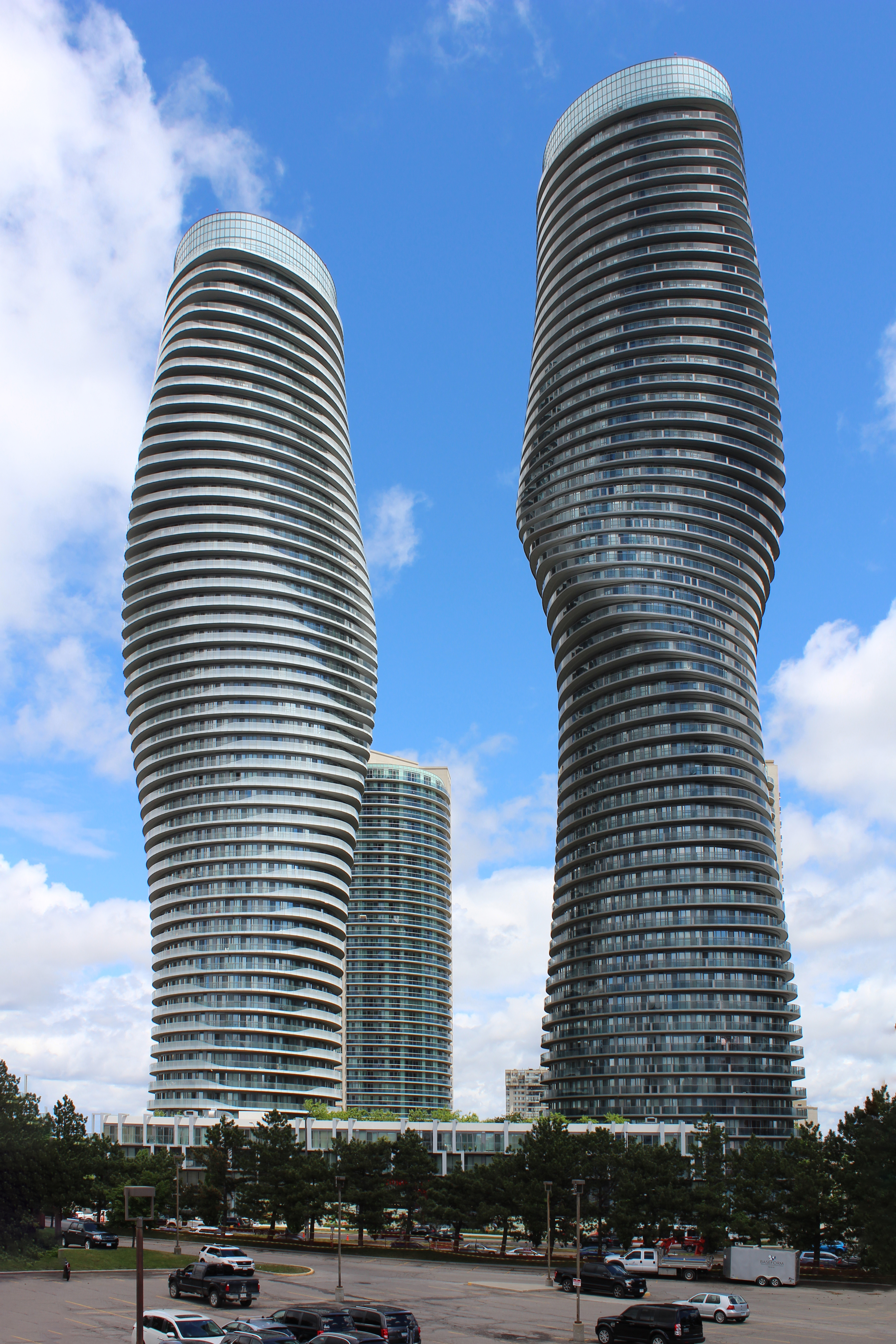
Absolute World, condominiums in the City Centre

There are 25 neighbourhoods in Mississauga:

- Applewood
- Central Erin Mills
- Churchill Meadows
- Clarkson
- Cooksville
- Creditview
- Dixie
- East Credit
- Erin Mills
- Erindale
- Fairview
- Hurontario
- Lakeview
- Lisgar
- Lorne Park
- Malton
- Meadowvale
- Meadowvale Village
- Mineola
- Mississauga Valleys
- Port Credit
- Rathwood
- Rockwood Village
- Sheridan
- Streetsville

=== Climate ===
Mississauga's climate is similar to that of Toronto and is considered to be moderate, located in plant hardiness zone 7a. Under the Köppen climate classification, Mississauga has a humid continental climate (Dfa/Dfb). Summers can bring periods of high temperatures accompanied with high humidity. While the average daily high temperature in July and August is 27 °C (80.6 °F), temperatures can rise above 32 °C (89.6 °F). In an average summer, there are an average of 15.8 days where the temperature rises above 30 °C (86.0 °F). Winters can be cold with temperatures that are frequently below freezing. In January and February, the mean temperatures are −5.5 °C (22.1 °F) and −4.5 °C (23.9 °F) respectively, it is common for temperatures to fall to −15 °C (5.0 °F), usually for only short periods. In an average winter, there are 3.9 nights where the temperature falls below −20 °C (−4.0 °F). The amount of snowfall received during an average winter season is 108.5 centimetres (42.7 in), averaging 44.4 days with measurable snowfall. The climate of Mississauga is officially represented by Pearson International Airport but because of its topography and large surface area conditions can differ depending on location: fog tends to be more common along the lakeshore and in the Credit River Valley at certain times of year, particularly during the spring and autumn.

During snowfalls when temperatures hover close to freezing, northern parts of the city away from warmer Lake Ontario, such as Pearson Airport, usually get more snow that sticks to the ground because of the lower temperatures, often when rain transitions into snow or mixed precipitation. The reverse occurs when a strong storm approaches from the south, kicking up lake effect snow and bringing higher snowfall totals to south Mississauga. The city usually experiences at least six months of snow-free weather; however, there is the odd occurrence where snow does fall either in October or May. The Port Credit and Lakeview areas have a micro-climate more affected by the proximity of the open lake, warming winter temperatures as a result.

Most thunderstorms are not severe but can occasionally bring violent winds. The last known tornado to cause significant damage touched down on 7 July 1985, when an F1-rated tornado struck an industrial park in the Meadowvale area (Argentia Road), heavily damaging some buildings and some parked tractor trailers. A relatively strong tornado tore a path across Mississauga (then part of Toronto Township) on 24 June 1923, cutting a swath from present-day Meadowvale to near Cooksville, killing four people and causing massive property damage in a time when most of Mississauga was still rural farmland dotted with fruit orchards.

Climate data for Lester B. Pearson International Airport (Brampton and North Mississauga) WMO ID: 71624; coordinates 43°40′38″N 79°37′50″W, elevation: 173.4 m (569 ft), 1991–2020 normals, extremes 1937–present
Month	Jan	Feb	Mar	Apr	May	Jun	Jul	Aug	Sep	Oct	Nov	Dec	Year
Record high humidex	19.0	18.3	29.6	37.9	42.6	45.6	50.3	46.6	48.0	39.1	28.6	23.9	50.3
Record high °C (°F)	17.6 (63.7)	17.7 (63.9)	26.0 (78.8)	31.1 (88.0)	34.4 (93.9)	36.7 (98.1)	37.9 (100.2)	38.3 (100.9)	36.7 (98.1)	31.8 (89.2)	25.1 (77.2)	20.0 (68.0)	38.3 (100.9)
Mean maximum °C (°F)	10.0 (50.0)	9.6 (49.3)	16.9 (62.4)	23.6 (74.5)	29.3 (84.7)	32.6 (90.7)	33.1 (91.6)	32.7 (90.9)	31.1 (88.0)	25.6 (78.1)	17.8 (64.0)	11.3 (52.3)	34.5 (94.1)
Mean daily maximum °C (°F)	−1.2 (29.8)	−0.3 (31.5)	5.0 (41.0)	12.0 (53.6)	19.2 (66.6)	24.5 (76.1)	27.4 (81.3)	26.3 (79.3)	22.3 (72.1)	14.6 (58.3)	7.9 (46.2)	1.9 (35.4)	13.3 (55.9)
Daily mean °C (°F)	−5 (23)	−4.4 (24.1)	0.6 (33.1)	7.0 (44.6)	13.7 (56.7)	19.2 (66.6)	22.1 (71.8)	21.1 (70.0)	16.9 (62.4)	10.0 (50.0)	4.1 (39.4)	−1.6 (29.1)	8.6 (47.5)
Mean daily minimum °C (°F)	−8.9 (16.0)	−8.5 (16.7)	−3.8 (25.2)	1.9 (35.4)	8.2 (46.8)	13.9 (57.0)	16.6 (61.9)	15.8 (60.4)	11.6 (52.9)	5.3 (41.5)	0.2 (32.4)	−5 (23)	3.9 (39.0)
Mean minimum °C (°F)	−19.9 (−3.8)	−18.7 (−1.7)	−13.8 (7.2)	−4.8 (23.4)	1.2 (34.2)	7.3 (45.1)	11.4 (52.5)	10.6 (51.1)	4.5 (40.1)	−1.5 (29.3)	−7.9 (17.8)	−14.9 (5.2)	−22.0 (−7.6)
Record low °C (°F)	−31.3 (−24.3)	−31.1 (−24.0)	−28.9 (−20.0)	−17.2 (1.0)	−5.6 (21.9)	0.6 (33.1)	3.9 (39.0)	1.1 (34.0)	−3.9 (25.0)	−8.3 (17.1)	−18.3 (−0.9)	−31.1 (−24.0)	−31.3 (−24.3)
Record low wind chill	−44.7	−38.9	−36.2	−25.4	−9.5	0.0	0.0	0.0	−8.0	−13.5	−25.4	−38.5	−44.7
Average precipitation mm (inches)	61.6 (2.43)	50.2 (1.98)	50.5 (1.99)	76.7 (3.02)	77.6 (3.06)	80.7 (3.18)	74.0 (2.91)	68.5 (2.70)	69.4 (2.73)	67.2 (2.65)	71.8 (2.83)	58.6 (2.31)	806.8 (31.76)
Average rainfall mm (inches)	33.8 (1.33)	23.9 (0.94)	34.0 (1.34)	70.7 (2.78)	77.5 (3.05)	80.7 (3.18)	74.0 (2.91)	68.5 (2.70)	69.4 (2.73)	67.0 (2.64)	62.7 (2.47)	35.3 (1.39)	697.4 (27.46)
Average snowfall cm (inches)	31.5 (12.4)	27.7 (10.9)	17.2 (6.8)	4.5 (1.8)	0.1 (0.0)	0.0 (0.0)	0.0 (0.0)	0.0 (0.0)	0.0 (0.0)	0.2 (0.1)	9.3 (3.7)	24.1 (9.5)	114.5 (45.1)
Average precipitation days (≥ 0.2 mm)	16.2	12.0	12.3	12.5	12.7	10.8	10.3	9.8	10.2	12.8	12.6	14.9	147.3
Average rainy days (≥ 0.2 mm)	6.2	4.6	7.2	11.7	12.7	10.8	10.3	9.8	10.2	12.8	10.4	7.5	114.1
Average snowy days (≥ 0.2 cm)	12.7	9.7	6.8	2.2	0.12	0.0	0.0	0.0	0.0	0.24	3.6	9.2	44.7
Average relative humidity (%) (at 15:00)	69.7	65.7	58.5	53.4	53.6	54.4	52.9	55.2	57.3	61.6	66.7	70.5	60.0
Average dew point °C (°F)	−8.6 (16.5)	−8.4 (16.9)	−5.2 (22.6)	−0.4 (31.3)	6.4 (43.5)	12.3 (54.1)	14.9 (58.8)	14.9 (58.8)	11.6 (52.9)	5.5 (41.9)	−0.1 (31.8)	−4.9 (23.2)	3.2 (37.8)
Mean monthly sunshine hours	79.7	112.2	159.4	204.4	228.2	249.7	294.4	274.5	215.7	163.7	94.2	86.2	2,161.4
Percentage possible sunshine	27.6	38.0	43.2	50.8	50.1	54.1	63.0	63.4	57.4	47.8	32.0	30.9	46.5
Source 1: Environment and Climate Change Canada
Source 2: weatherstats.ca (for dewpoint and monthly/yearly average absolute maximum/minimum temperature)

== Demographics ==
Historical populations
Year	Pop.	±%
1971	172,352	—
1976	250,017	+45.1%
1981	315,055	+26.0%
1986	374,005	+18.7%
1991	463,388	+23.9%
1996	544,382	+17.5%
2001	612,925	+12.6%
2006	668,549	+9.1%
2011	713,443	+6.7%
2016	721,599	+1.1%
2021	717,961	−0.5%

In the 2021 Census of Population conducted by Statistics Canada, Mississauga had a population of 717,961 living in 244,575 of its 254,089 total private dwellings, a change of −0.5% from its 2016 population of 721,599. With a land area of 292.74 km^{2} (113.03 sq mi), it had a population density of 2,452.6/km^{2} (6,352.1/sq mi) in 2021.

In 2021, 15.2% of the population was under 15 years of age, and 16.6% was 65 years and over. The median age in Mississauga was 40.8.

=== Ethnicity ===
Panethnic groups in the City of Mississauga (2001−2021)
Panethnic group	2021		2016		2011		2006		2001	
Panethnic group	Pop.	%	Pop.	%	Pop.	%	Pop.	%	Pop.	%
European (Note: Statistic includes all persons that did not make up part of a visible minority or an Indigenous identity.)	267,790	37.57%	302,370	42.26%	324,655	45.81%	336,755	50.59%	362,430	59.34%
South Asian	180,800	25.36%	165,765	23.17%	154,210	21.76%	134,750	20.24%	91,150	14.92%
East Asian (Note: Statistic includes total responses of "Chinese", "Korean", and "Japanese" under visible minority section on census.)	60,035	8.42%	62,150	8.69%	58,515	8.26%	55,410	8.32%	43,110	7.06%
Southeast Asian (Note: Statistic includes total responses of "Filipino" and "Southeast Asian" under visible minority section on census.)	55,500	7.79%	51,365	7.18%	55,550	7.84%	44,865	6.74%	34,630	5.67%
Middle Eastern (Note: Statistic includes total responses of "West Asian" and "Arab" under visible minority section on census.)	51,315	7.2%	44,110	6.17%	32,825	4.63%	22,800	3.43%	15,615	2.56%
Black	49,220	6.9%	47,005	6.57%	44,775	6.32%	41,365	6.21%	37,850	6.2%
Latin American	17,325	2.43%	16,110	2.25%	15,360	2.17%	12,410	1.86%	9,265	1.52%
Indigenous	3,555	0.5%	4,175	0.58%	3,200	0.45%	2,475	0.37%	2,055	0.34%
Other/Multiracial (Note: Statistic includes total responses of "Visible minority, n.i.e." and "Multiple visible minorities" under visible minority section on census.)	27,300	3.83%	22,420	3.13%	19,635	2.77%	14,815	2.23%	14,705	2.41%
Total responses	712,825	99.28%	715,475	99.15%	708,725	99.34%	665,655	99.57%	610,815	99.66%
Total population	717,961	100%	721,599	100%	713,443	100%	668,549	100%	612,925	100%
Note: Totals greater than 100% due to multiple origin responses

Ethnocultural background (2021 census)	Population	%
European	267,790	37.6
South Asian	180,800	25.4
Chinese	52,095	7.3
Black	49,220	6.9
Filipino	38,335	5.4
Arab	42,805	6.0
Latin American	17,325	2.4
Southeast Asian	17,165	2.4
West Asian	8,510	1.2
Korean	5,825	0.8
Japanese	2,115	0.3
Indigenous	3,555	0.5
Other visible minority	10,890	1.5
Multiple visible minorities	16,410	2.3
Total responses	712,825	99.3%
Total population	717,961	100%

Ethnic/cultural origins (2021 census)	Population	%
Indian	90,560	12.7
Chinese	55,350	7.8
English	46,415	6.5
Canadian	42,315	5.9
Pakistani	41,025	5.8
Irish	39,785	5.6
Italian	38,075	5.3
Filipino	37,325	5.2
Scottish	36,800	5.2
Polish	36,095	5.1
Portuguese	27,845	3.9
German	19,285	2.7
Ukrainian	17,350	2.4
Arab, n.o.s.	16,645	2.3
Jamaican	15,860	2.2
French, n.o.s.	15,425	2.2

=== Religion ===
Religions in Mississauga
Religion	Per cent
Christianity	49.9%
None	18.1%
Islam	17.0%
Hinduism	8.8%
Sikhism	3.4%
Buddhism	2.0%
Distribution of religions throughout Mississauga

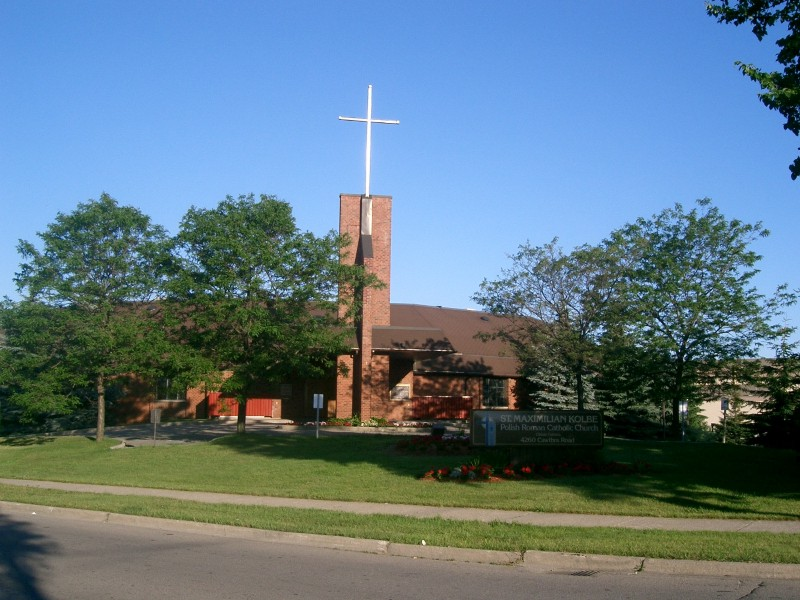
St. Maximilian Catholic Church

The 2021 census found the most reported religion in the city to be Christianity (49.9%), with Catholicism (30.4%) making up the largest denomination, followed by Orthodox (3.6%), Anglicanism (2.0%), United Church (1.5%), Pentecostal and other Charismatic churches (1.2%), and other denominations. The next most reported religions were Islam (17.0%), Hinduism (8.8%) Sikhism (3.4%), Buddhism (2.0%), and Judaism (0.2%). Those who claimed no religious affiliation made up 18.1% of the population.

Religious groups in the City of Mississauga (1991−2021)
Religious group	2021		2011		2001		1991	
Religious group	Pop.	%	Pop.	%	Pop.	%	Pop.	%
Christian	355,735	49.9%	424,715	59.93%	427,725	70.03%	365,665	79.25%
Muslim	120,965	16.97%	84,325	11.9%	41,845	6.85%	12,260	2.66%
Hindu	62,520	8.77%	49,325	6.96%	29,165	4.77%	12,185	2.64%
Sikh	24,505	3.44%	23,995	3.39%	23,425	3.84%	12,560	2.72%
Buddhist	14,300	2.01%	15,615	2.2%	11,600	1.9%	4,185	0.91%
Jewish	1,380	0.19%	1,830	0.26%	1,905	0.31%	1,800	0.39%
Other religion	4,485	0.63%	3,250	0.46%	2,070	0.34%	1,445	0.31%
Irreligious	128,940	18.09%	105,660	14.91%	73,085	11.97%	51,315	11.12%
Total responses	712,825	99.28%	708,725	99.34%	610,815	99.66%	461,420	99.58%

=== Language ===
The 2021 census found that English was the mother tongue of 44.9% of the population. The next most common mother tongues were Urdu (5.0%), Arabic (4.7%), Mandarin (3.2%), Polish (3.1%), and Punjabi (2.9%). Of the official languages, 96.5% of the population knew English and 6.8% knew French.

Mother tongue languages in Mississauga (2001–2021)
Mother tongue	2021 Canadian census		2016 Canadian census		2011 Canadian census		2006 Canadian census		2001 Canadian census	
Mother tongue	Pop.	%	Pop.	%	Pop.	%	Pop.	%	Pop.	%
English	375,245	52.49%	367,150	51.15%	368,045	51.8%	339,895	51.06%	346,590	56.74%
Urdu	45,435	6.36%	44,760	6.24%	39,640	5.58%	30,725	4.62%	14,335	2.35%
Arabic	40,505	5.67%	33,955	4.73%	24,450	3.44%	17,290	2.6%	12,495	2.05%
Mandarin	24,745	3.46%	24,015	3.35%	19,775	2.78%	13,425	2.02%	7,470	1.22%
Punjabi	24,560	3.44%	22,080	3.08%	24,595	3.46%	24,145	3.63%	24,045	3.94%
Tagalog	23,835	3.33%	24,325	3.39%	23,400	3.29%	17,890	2.69%	13,565	2.22%
Polish	23,830	3.33%	27,915	3.89%	30,315	4.27%	29,020	4.36%	29,550	4.84%
Hindi	17,895	2.5%	12,350	1.72%	11,305	1.59%	8,425	1.27%	4,590	0.75%
Spanish	17,480	2.45%	17,145	2.39%	16,860	2.37%	14,145	2.12%	10,895	1.78%
Cantonese	16,470	2.3%	17,390	2.42%	20,590	2.9%	22,690	3.41%	21,415	3.51%
Portuguese	15,610	2.18%	17,120	2.38%	18,925	2.66%	18,745	2.82%	18,480	3.03%
Tamil	12,960	1.81%	11,310	1.58%	11,285	1.59%	10,025	1.51%	7,405	1.21%
Italian	11,685	1.63%	13,785	1.92%	15,285	2.15%	16,580	2.49%	17,450	2.86%
Vietnamese	11,620	1.63%	10,670	1.49%	10,470	1.47%	10,380	1.56%	7,745	1.27%
French	11,040	1.54%	11,015	1.53%	10,805	1.52%	9,805	1.47%	9,715	1.59%
Serbo-Croatian	9,835	1.38%	10,975	1.53%	11,550	1.63%	11,645	1.75%	10,980	1.8%
Gujarati	9,155	1.28%	9,010	1.26%	9,060	1.28%	7,620	1.14%	4,595	0.75%
Ukrainian	6,825	0.95%	6,850	0.95%	6,190	0.87%	5,785	0.87%	4,645	0.76%
Russian	5,265	0.74%	5,115	0.71%	4,780	0.67%	3,540	0.53%	2,030	0.33%
Korean	4,765	0.67%	4,965	0.69%	5,500	0.77%	5,775	0.87%	4,415	0.72%
Total responses	714,835	99.6%	717,855	99.5%	710,475	99.6%	665,655	99.6%	610,820	99.7%
Total population	717,961	100%	721,599	100%	713,443	100%	668,549	100%	612,925	100%

== Economy ==
Over 60 of the Fortune 500 companies base their global or Canadian head offices in Mississauga. Some of the strongest industries are pharmaceuticals, banking and finance, electronics and computers, aerospace, transportation parts and equipment industries.

TD Bank also has Corporate IT development centres in the city along with Royal Bank of Canada, Purolator Inc., and Laura Secord Chocolates are headquartered in the city, and Walmart, Kellogg's, Panasonic, Hewlett-Packard, and Oracle's Canadian headquarters are also in Mississauga. Regional airline Jazz operates a regional office in Mississauga. Mississauga is also an aircraft development hub, hosting the Canadian headquarters of aerospace companies such as Magellan Aerospace and Honeywell Aerospace.

== Arts and culture ==
The Mississauga Arts Council celebrates the city's arts community by holding an annual awards ceremony, called the MARTYs, to recognize the city's entertainers, artists, filmmakers, writers, and musicians.

Mississauga's largest festivities, such as the Canada Day Celebration, Mississauga Rotary Ribfest, Tree Lighting Ceremony, and New Year's Eve Bash, generally occur in Celebration Square. The Canada Day celebration was attended by 130,000 people in 2012, the Ribfest has recorded 120,000 visitors in 2012, and the inaugural New Year's Eve in 2011 has attracted 30,000 spectators.

One of the most anticipated events in the city is Carassauga, a festival of cultures that occurs annually during mid-May. It is the second largest cultural festival in Canada. During 2013, 4014 performances took place and 300,000 people attended. Carassauga displays different cultures around the world by setting up pavilions for various countries around Mississauga. Visitors get free public transportation with their ticket to tour the city and explore the different pavilions. The featured countries showcase their culture through food stalls, dance performances and small vendors. The event largely takes place in the Hershey Centre.

There are also culture-specific festivals held in Celebration Square, including Fiesta Ng Kalayaan for the Philippines, Viet Summerfest for Vietnam, Muslimfest for the city's Muslim community, the festival of Diwali for the Indian community, and Mosaic Festival, which is the largest South Asian multi-disciplinary arts festival in North America.

The annual Bread and Honey Festival is held in Streetsville, a district that was once an independent rural village. It is held every first weekend of June at Streetsville Memorial Park to commemorate the founding of the village. The festival was inaugurated in 1974, in response to amalgamation with the City of Mississauga. Activities include the Bread and Honey Race, which raises money for charities and local hospitals. It also has its own annual Canada Day celebrations, which are also held at Streetsville Memorial Park.

Port Credit, another neighbourhood that was formerly an independent town, holds multiple festivals throughout the year. During the summer, there are street performances on multiple venues scattered throughout the district during Buskerfest. The neighbourhood also holds a grand parade named "Paint the Town Red" during Canada Day. Finally, during August, it holds the Mississauga Waterfront Festival, which includes concerts as well as family activities. During September, the Tim Hortons Southside Shuffle is held to celebrate the neighbourhood's Blues and Jazz Festival, which includes musical performances from local blues and jazz artists.

The Malton neighbourhood, which contains a significant number of Sikhs, holds an annual Khalsa Day parade, marching between the gurdwaras in Malton (Sri Guru Singh Sabha) and in the Rexdale neighbourhood in Toronto (Sikh Spiritual Centre). In 2011, the parade was attended by 100,000 people.

Mississauga has a significant Jewish population, with active community classes, cultural activities and holiday celebrations.

=== Library ===
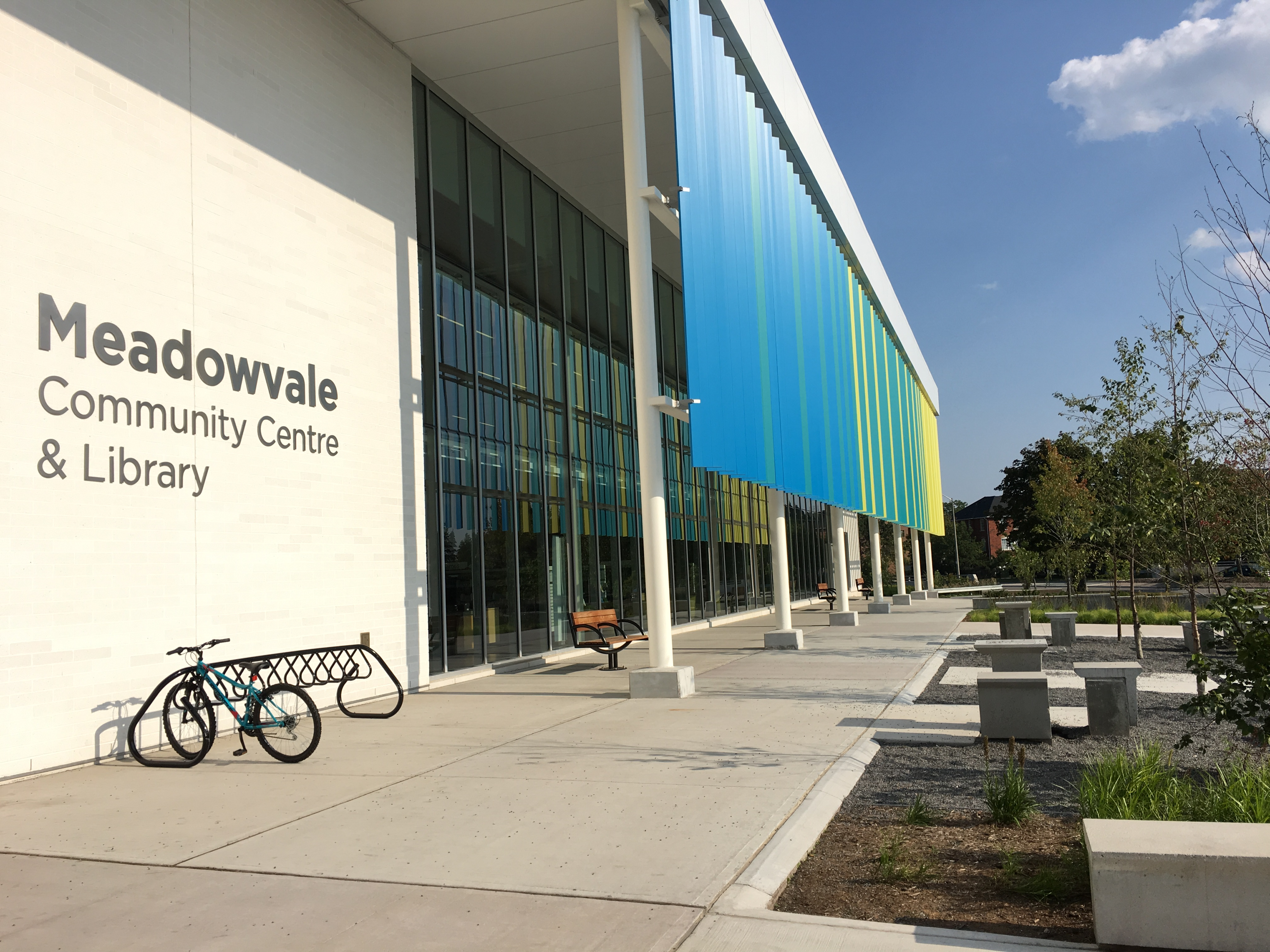
The Meadowvale Community Centre was renovated in July 2014 and re-opened in fall 2016 with a new library within the building.

The Mississauga Library System is a municipally owned network of 18 libraries.

== Attractions ==
=== Mississauga Celebration Square ===
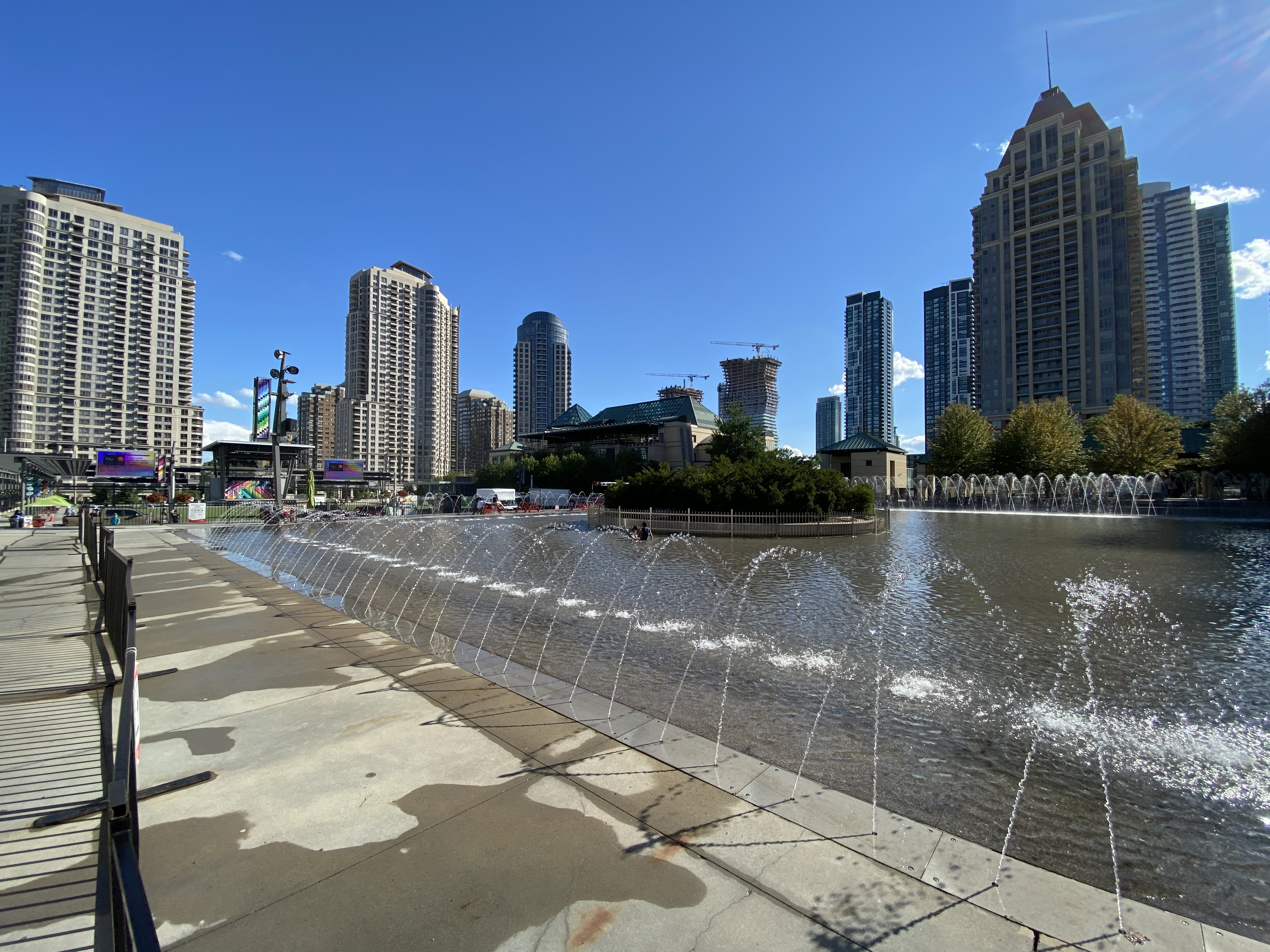
Celebration Square

In 2006, with the help of Project for Public Spaces, the city started hosting "My Mississauga" summer festivities at its Civic Square. Mississauga planned over 60 free events to bring more people to the city square. The square was transformed and included a movable stage, a snack bar, extra seating, and sports and gaming facilities (basketball nets, hockey arena, chess and checker boards) including a skate park. Some of the events included Senior's day on Tuesday, Family day on Wednesday, Vintage car Thursdays, with the main events being the Canada Day celebration, Rotary Ribfest, Tree Lighting Ceremony, and Beachfest.

Civic Square has completed its restructuring project using federal stimulus money, which features a permanent stage, a larger ice rink (which also serves as a fountain and wading pool during the summer season), media screens, and a permanent restaurant. It officially reopened at 22 June 2011 and has since been renamed as Mississauga Celebration Square. More events have been added such as holding free outdoor live concerts, and live telecast of UEFA European Football Championship. The square also holds weekly programming such as fitness classes, amphitheatre performances and movie nights during the summer, children's activities during spring and fall, and skate parties during the winter. The opening of the square has also allowed the city to hold its first annual New Year's Eve celebration in 2011.

In October 2012, the square had attracted its one millionth visitor.

=== Art Gallery of Mississauga ===
The Art Gallery of Mississauga (AGM) is a public, not-for-profit art gallery located in the Mississauga Civic Centre right on Celebration Square across from the Living Arts Centre and Square One Shopping Centre. AGM is sponsored by the City of Mississauga, Canada Council for the Arts, Ontario Trillium Foundation and the Ontario Arts Council. The art gallery offers free admission and tours and is open every day. AGM has over 500 copies and is working on creating a digital gallery led by gallery assistant Aaron Guravich.

=== Shopping ===
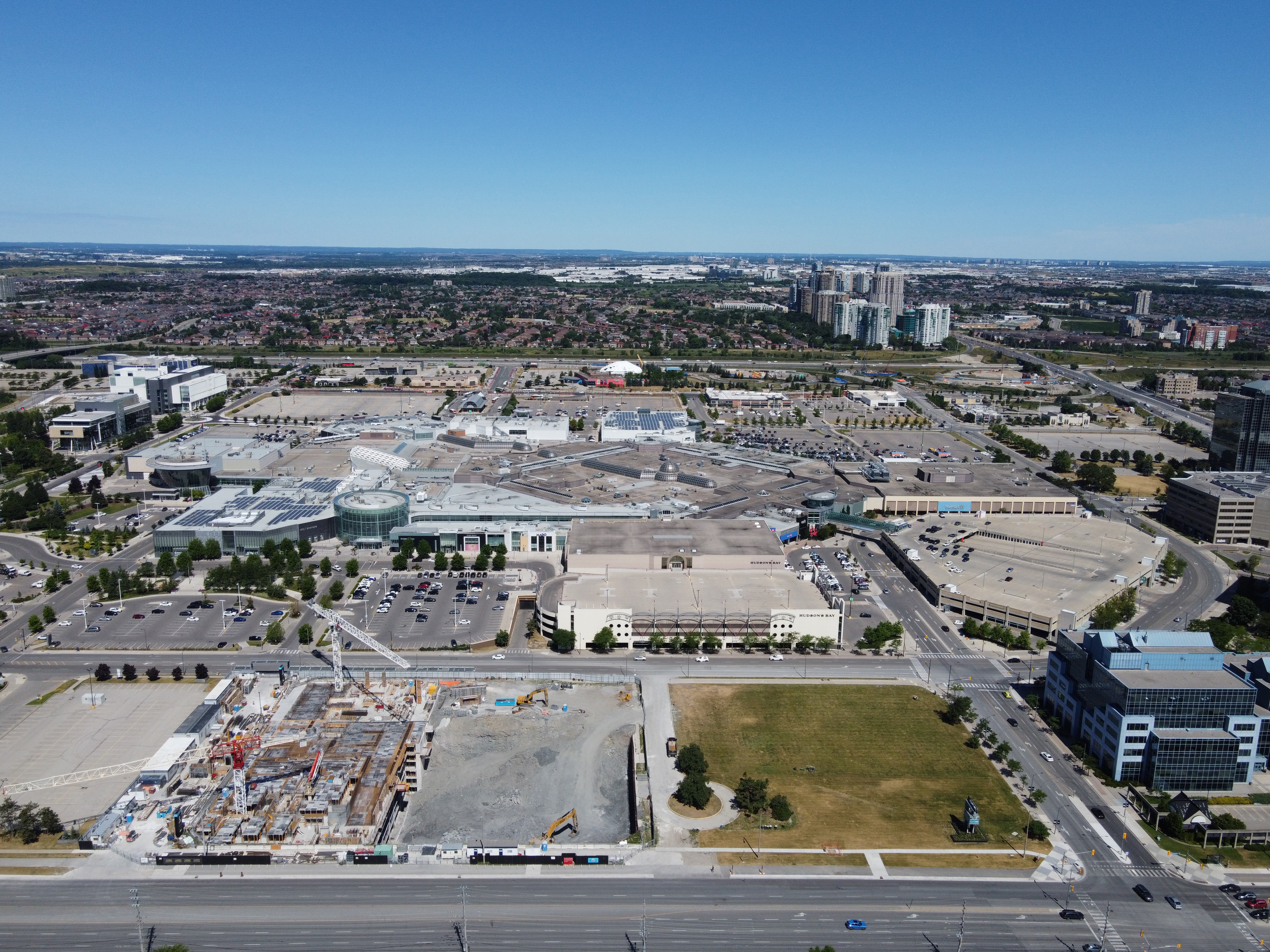
Square One Shopping Centre

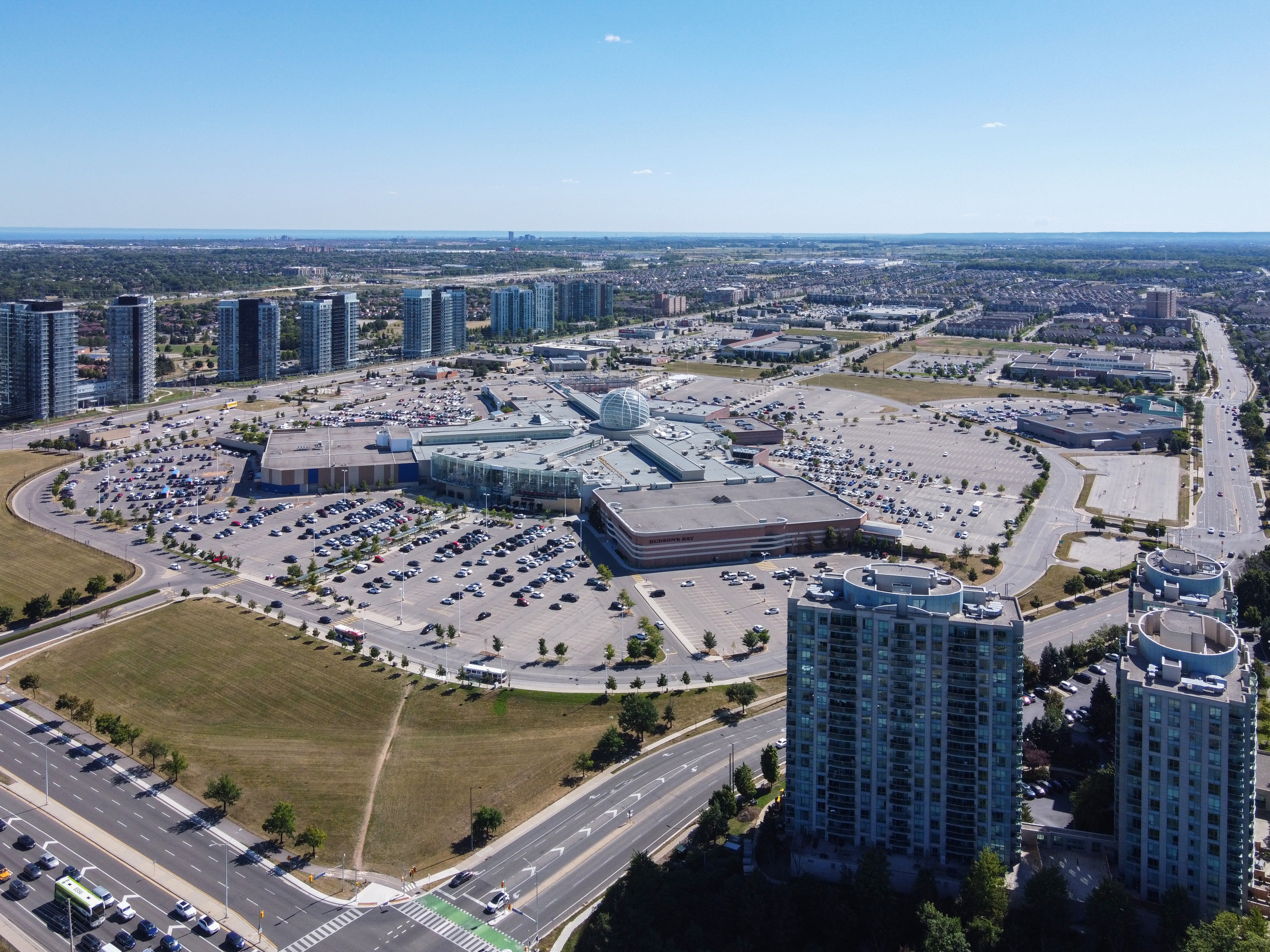
Erin Mills Town Centre

Square One Shopping Centre is located in the City Centre and is the second largest shopping mall in Canada. It boasts more than 350 retail stores and services and attracts 24 million annual visitors and makes over $1 billion in annual retail sales. It opened in 1973.

Erin Mills Town Centre is the second largest mall in Mississauga. It is located in the western end of the city at Eglinton Avenue and Erin Mills Parkway and opened in 1989.

Other shopping centres include Dixie Outlet Mall, located in the southeastern area of the city. It is Canada's largest enclosed outlet mall. It opened in 1956 when the city was still known as Toronto Township, and was Mississauga's first shopping mall. Many factory outlets of premium brands are located in this mall. Heartland Town Centre is an unenclosed power centre with 180 stores and restaurants. A flea market, the Fantastic Flea Market, is Mississauga's oldest flea market, and opened in 1976.

=== Recreation ===
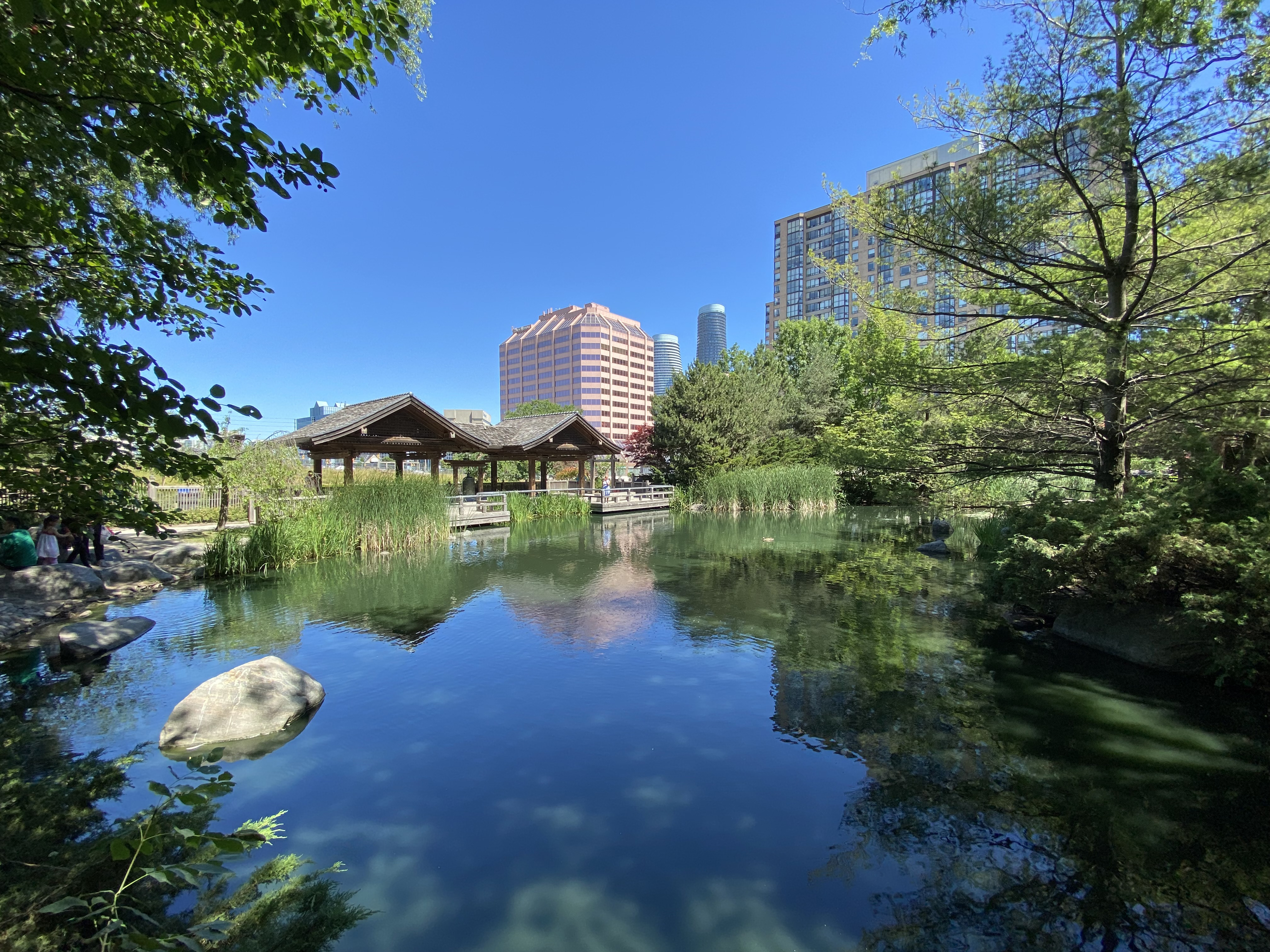
Kariya Park

Recreational clubs include the Mississauga Figure Skating Club, Mississauga Synchronized Swimming Association, Mississauga Canoe Club, Mississauga Scrabble Club, Don Rowing Club at Port Credit, International Soccer Club Mississauga, and the Mississauga Aquatic Club. There are over 481 parks and woodlands areas in Mississauga, with nearly 100 km (62 mi) of trails that users can traverse. Mississauga is home to many indoor playgrounds, including Kids Time Family Fun Centre, KidSports indoor playground, and Laser Quest Centre. There are over 26 major indoor playgrounds in the city of Mississauga.

Kariya Park, opened in 1992, is a Japanese garden located in the City Centre. It is named after Mississauga’s sister city, Kariya, Japan.

=== Beaches ===
Since 2016, Mississauga has made immense efforts to rehabilitate its lakeshore, with collection of garbage occurring daily, and detailed water quality monitoring taking place to ensure a safe swimming environment. As of 2024, Mississauga has had pristine beaches in the Greater Toronto Area, attracting tens of thousands of locals and tourists from all over.

Within Mississauga, beaches are concentrated along the shore of Lake Ontario, with the notable exception of the Lake Aquitaine boardwalk.The most distinguished beaches are Jack Darling Memorial Park and RK McMillan Park, as well as St. Lawrence Park in Port Credit.

== Sports ==
The Mississauga Sports and Entertainment Centre (formerly the Hershey Centre and Paramount Fine Foods Centre) is the city's main sports venue. It is the home arena for the Raptors 905 of the NBA G League. The arena was originally built for Mississauga's first OHL team, the Mississauga Icedogs, before they moved to St. Catharines and became the Niagara IceDogs. The Steelheads are the rebranded Mississauga St. Michael's Majors who had moved from Toronto in 2007. The arena was formerly the home of the Mississauga MetroStars of the MASL. It formerly was the home arena for the Mississauga Power of the National Basketball League of Canada before the team dissolved in 2015 after the announcement of the Raptors 905. In 2018, Mississauga's City Council approved a motion to study the feasibility and business case for construction of a new stadium in Mississauga with the hope of gaining a new CPL team.

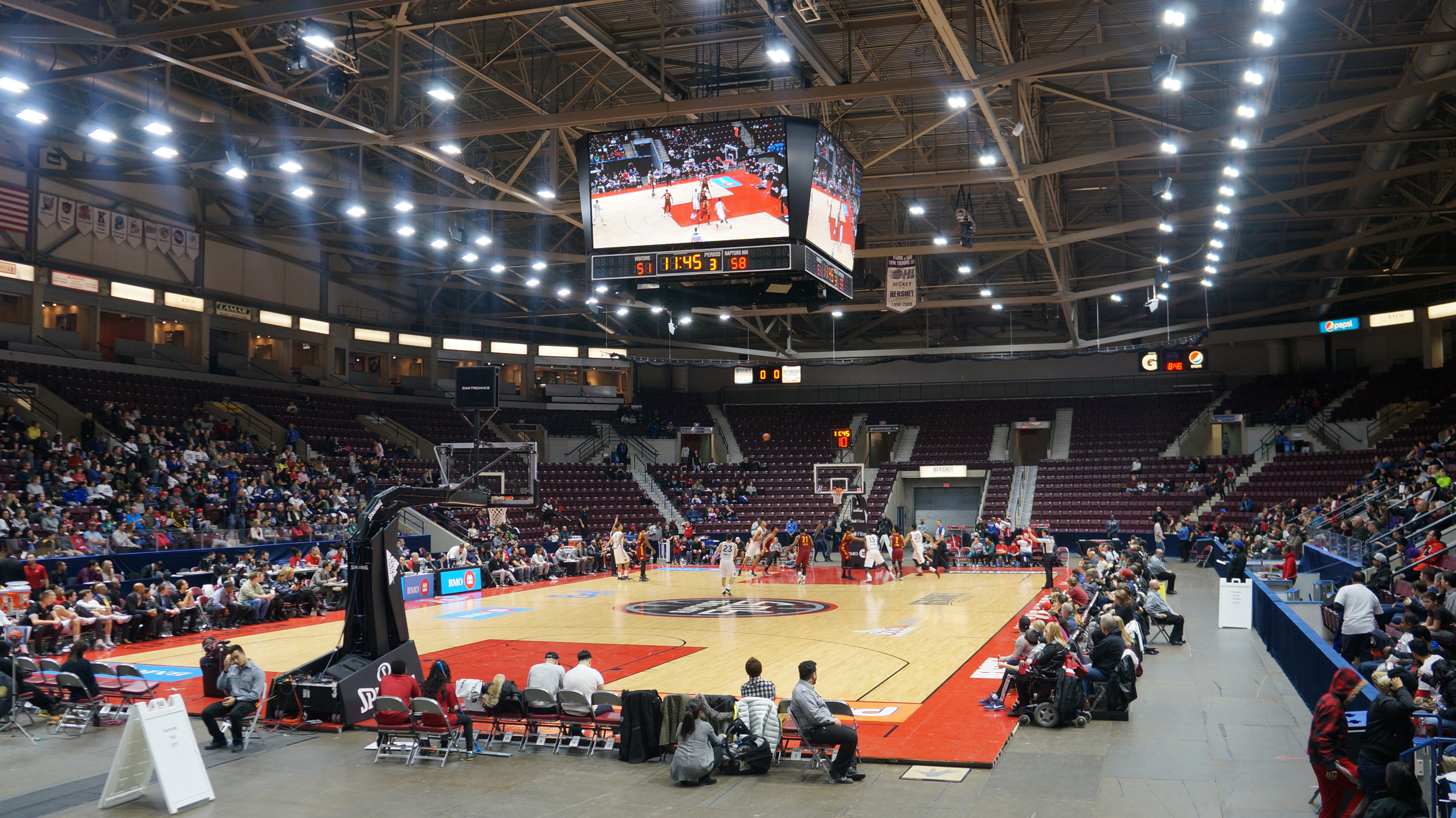
An NBA Development League between the Charge Canton and Raptors 905 at the Mississauga Sports and Entertainment Centre

Other hockey teams in Mississauga include the Mississauga Chargers of the Ontario Provincial Junior A Hockey League (who play at Port Credit Arena), and the many teams in the Greater Toronto Hockey League, Mississauga Hockey League, and Mississauga Girls Hockey League that play in the city's 13 arenas. The Mississauga Chiefs of the defunct Canadian Women's Hockey League previously played at Iceland Mississauga. In addition, there is a roller hockey team, the Mississauga Rattlers of the Great Lakes Inline Junior "A" Roller Hockey League.

Mississauga also has teams for box lacrosse (Mississauga Tomahawks of the OLA Junior A Lacrosse League), cricket (Bangla Tigers Mississauga of Global T20 Canada, Mississauga Masters of Canada Super60, Mississauga Ramblers of the Toronto and District Cricket League, Mississauga Titans of the Etobicoke District Cricket League), and Canadian football. The Mississauga Football League (MFL) is a youth football program that is for players aged 7–17, founded in 1971. The city also has other amateur football teams in Ontario leagues: the Mississauga Warriors of the Ontario Varsity Football League and the Mississauga Demons of the Ontario Australian Football League. Mississauga's rugby players are now served by the Mississauga Blues through u7 - u17 Youth And Junior Programs as well as hosting one or more Senior Men's and Senior Women's Teams.

Ringette is one of the affiliated youth groups that are allocated ice time by the City of Mississauga (Recreation and Parks Division, Community Services Department) on an allocated priority basis. The Ringette program is administered by the Mississauga Ringette Association.

Mississauga Marathon, a qualifier race for the Boston Marathon, is held in Mississauga annually.

Mississauga is also the host for the following major sports events:

- 2000 IIHF Women's World Championship (Co-host)
- 2016, 2024 World Junior Girls Golf Championship
- 2017 ISU World Junior Synchronized Skating Championships
- 2022 Ontario Summer Games, and the Ontario ParaSport Games
- 2024 World Mahjong Championship

== Government ==
Mississauga City Council consists of the mayor and eleven city councillors, each representing one of the city's eleven numbered wards. The former mayor, Hazel McCallion, at one time the longest-serving mayor in Canada, was succeeded by Bonnie Crombie in November 2014, who resigned in January 2024 to become the leader of the liberal party of Ontario. Former city councillor Carolyn Parrish became Mayor in a by-election in 2024. Currently, the seat is held by former Ward 2 councillor Alvin Tedjo after defeating incumbent mayor Parrish and former mayor Crombie in the 2026 elections.

=== Wards and councillors ===
Council elected in the 2026 municipal election:

Councillor	Ward	Notes
Alvin Tedjo	Mayor	
Stephen Dasko	Ward 1 (Port Credit, Lakeview)	
Tom Ellard	Ward 2 (Clarkson, Lorne Park)	
Chris Fonseca	Ward 3 (Rathwood, Applewood)	
John Kovac	Ward 4 (City Centre)	
Natalie Hart	Ward 5 (Britannia Woods, Malton)	
Joe Horneck	Ward 6 (Erindale)	
Lucas Alves	Ward 7 (Cooksville)	
Matt Mahoney	Ward 8 (Erin Mills)	
Martin Reid	Ward 9 (Meadowvale)	
Sue McFadden	Ward 10 (Lisgar, Churchill Meadows)	
Brad Butt	Ward 11 (Streetsville)	

The City of Mississauga has had only six mayors in its history. Martin Dobkin was the city's first mayor in 1974. He was then followed by Ron A. Searle. Searle was defeated in 1978 by then-city councillor and former mayor of Streetsville, Hazel McCallion. McCallion won 12 consecutive terms as mayor, but she chose to retire prior to the November 2014 election and was succeeded by Bonnie Crombie, who won the election. Crombie remained as mayor of Mississauga until 2024 when she left the post to accept a nomination as leader of the Liberal Party of Ontario. Longtime city councillor Carolyn Parrish won the subsequent by-election.

McCallion was regarded as a force in provincial politics and often referred to as Hurricane Hazel, after the devastating 1954 storm that struck the Toronto area. McCallion won or was acclaimed in every mayoral election from 1978 to 2010, in some later elections without even campaigning. In October 2010, McCallion won her twelfth term in office with over 76% of the votes. McCallion was the nation's longest-serving mayor and was runner-up in World Mayor 2005. In 2014 McCallion did not run again, but endorsed Crombie, the eventual winner who became mayor in November 2014. Parrish was defeated by Ward 2 councillor Tedjo in 2026.

=== Provincial electoral districts ===
Mississauga federal election results
Year	Liberal		Conservative		New Democratic		Green	
2021	50%	145,139	33%	96,717	11%	32,632	2%	4,816
2019	53%	176,112	32%	107,330	10%	32,294	4%	12,124
2015	52%	165,282	36%	116,257	9%	29,822	2%	6,227

Mississauga provincial election results
Year	PC		New Democratic		Liberal		Green	
2022	44%	94,007	12%	25,698	36%	76,972	4%	8,601
2018	42%	113,313	25%	69,501	27%	75,003	3%	7,535

- Mississauga Centre (provincial electoral district)
- Mississauga East—Cooksville (provincial electoral district)
- Mississauga—Erin Mills (provincial electoral district)
- Mississauga—Lakeshore (provincial electoral district)
- Mississauga—Malton (provincial electoral district)
- Mississauga—Streetsville (provincial electoral district)

=== Federal electoral districts ===
- Mississauga Centre
- Mississauga East—Cooksville
- Mississauga—Erin Mills
- Mississauga-Lakeshore
- Mississauga—Malton
- Mississauga—Streetsville

== Infrastructure ==
=== Transportation ===
==== Rail ====
Mississauga is on three major railway lines (one each owned by the Canadian National Railway, the Canadian Pacific Railway, and Metrolinx). Toronto–Sarnia Via Rail trains on the Quebec City-Windsor Corridor pass through Mississauga and make request stops at Malton GO Station in the northeast of the city. Other Via Rail services stop in the neighbouring cities of Brampton, Oakville, and Toronto.

==== Commuter rail ====
Commuter rail service is provided by GO Transit, a division of Metrolinx, on the Lakeshore West, Kitchener, and Milton lines. All-day service is provided along the Lakeshore West line, while the Kitchener and Milton lines serve commuters going to and from Toronto's Union Station during rush hours.

==== Bus ====
The city's public transit service, MiWay (formerly Mississauga Transit), provides bus service along more than 60 routes across the city, and connects to commuter rail with GO Transit as well as with Brampton Transit, Oakville Transit, and the Toronto Transit Commission (TTC). MiWay operates routes for both local service (branded as "MiLocal") and limited-stop service (branded as "MiExpress").

Intercity buses operated by GO Transit stop at GO Train stations throughout the city and the Square One Bus Terminal.

==== Mississauga Transitway ====
A 12-station busway similar to Ottawa's Transitway was built parallel to Highway 403 from Winston Churchill Boulevard to Renforth Avenue, via the City Centre Transit Terminal. Opened in stages, the Mississauga Transitway was completed on 22 November 2017 with the opening of the final station: Renforth. The service also connects to Kipling Subway Station in Toronto, via mixed lane traffic after Renforth station.

==== Hurontario LRT ====
There are plans for the construction of an LRT line along Hurontario Street stretching from Port Credit to southern Brampton, and possibly to Brampton's downtown. The project went through the Transit Project Assessment Process (TPAP) which includes environmental assessment. The line will be fully funded by the provincial government, with construction set to begin in 2018. Rapid transit lines could possibly be built on some other main thoroughfares, namely Dundas Street and Lakeshore Road, but no definite dates have been set.

As of 2026, construction of the Hurontario LRT is well underway, but its completion date is unknown.

==== Toronto Subway ====
In addition to the 19 km (12 mi) light rail line, there are plans to extend Line 5 Eglinton to Renforth station and Toronto Pearson International Airport though eastern Mississauga by 2030–2031 bringing the Toronto Subway into Mississauga. There will be 4 stops in the city: Renforth Gateway, connecting with the Mississauga Transitway and serving the Airport Corporate Centre; Convair, serving the GTAA headquarters and airfield and aircraft maintenance areas; Silver Dart, serving rental car facilities and airport hotels; and Pearson Airport, serving the airport at a future transit hub.

==== Highways ====
Highway 401, or the Macdonald-Cartier Freeway, connecting Windsor to the Quebec border, passes through the city's north end. The eastern part uses the collector/express lane system and feeds into Highway 403, the main freeway in the city, which runs through the City Centre and Erin Mills areas. The Queen Elizabeth Way, the city's first freeway, runs through the southern half of the city. These three freeways each run east–west, with the exception of the 403 from the 401 to Cawthra Road, and from the 407 to QEW. North of the 401, the collector lanes of the 403 become Highway 410, which goes to Brampton. Part of Highway 409 is within the city of Mississauga, and it provides access to Pearson Airport. Two other freeways run along or close to Mississauga's municipal borders. Highway 407 runs metres from the northern city limits in a power transmission corridor and forms the city's boundary with Milton between highways 401 and 403. Highway 427 forms the Toronto-Mississauga boundary in the northeast, and is always within 2 kilometres of the boundary further south, with the exception of the area around Centennial Park.

==== Air ====
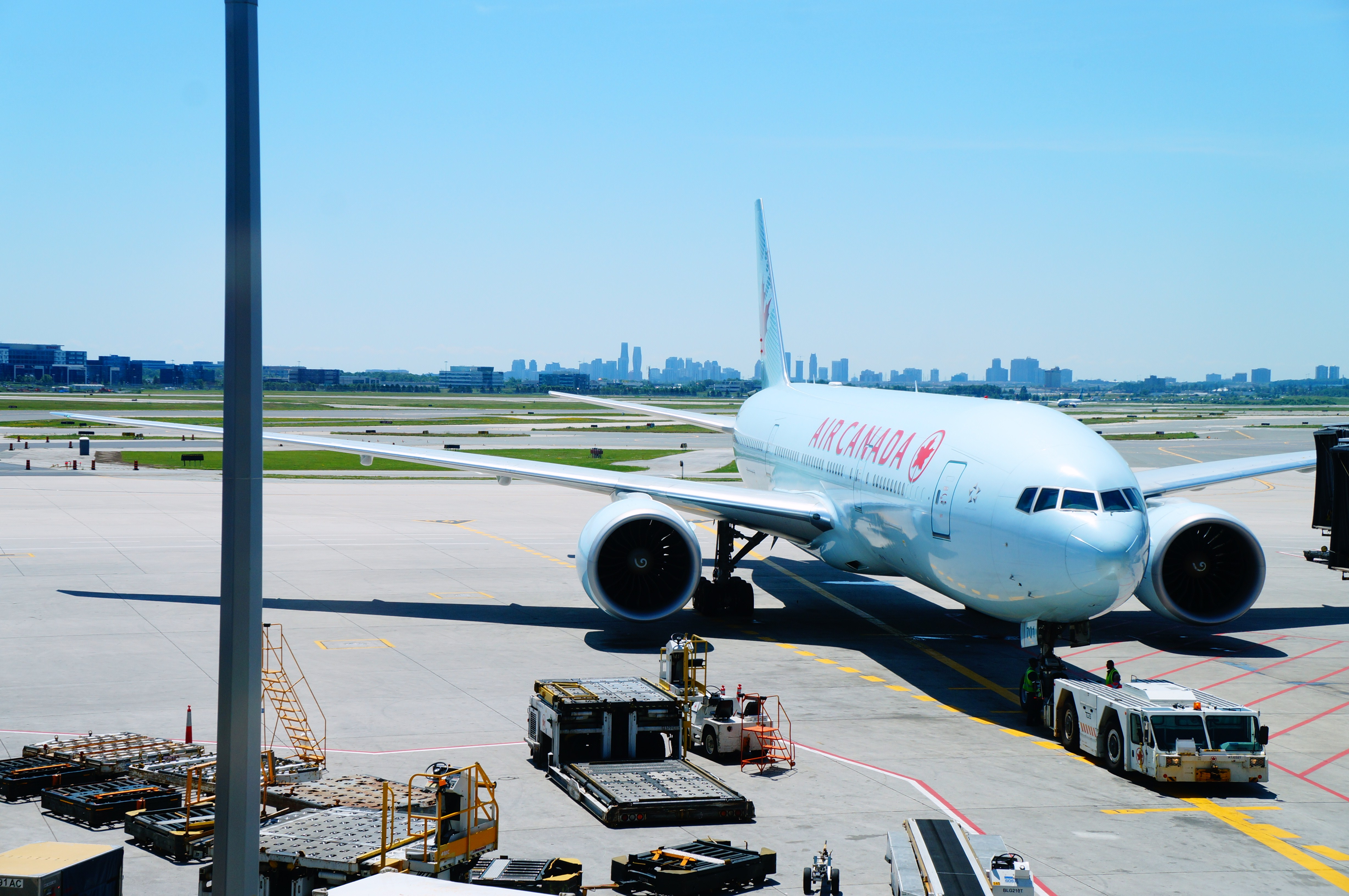
Most of Pearson International Airport is located within Mississauga (skyline visible in background)

Lester B. Pearson International Airport (YYZ), operated by the Greater Toronto Airports Authority in the northeastern part of the city, is the largest and busiest airport in Canada. In 2015, it handled 41,036,847 passengers and 443,958 aircraft movements. It is a major North American global gateway, handling more international passengers than any airport in North America other than John F. Kennedy International Airport. Pearson is the main hub for Air Canada, and a hub for passenger airline WestJet and cargo airline FedEx Express. It is served by over 75 airlines, having over 180 destinations.

==== Bicycle ====
In 2010, the City of Mississauga approved a Cycling Master Plan outlining a strategy to develop over 900 kilometres (560 miles) of on and off-road cycling routes in the city over the next 20 years. Over 1,000 Mississauga citizens and stakeholders contributed their thoughts and ideas to help develop this plan. The plan focuses on fostering cycling as a way of life in the city, building an integrated network of cycling routes and aims to adopt a safety first approach to cycling.

As of 2024, the city has bi-directional bus lanes on most major arteries, with designated bike paths on many roads, such as Eglinton Avenue, Lakeshore Road West, Burnhamthorpe Road and Derry Road. For roads which do not have designated bike lanes, bikes are permitted to use the shoulder where available, or the right-most lane in most other situations.

=== Emergency services ===
Peel Regional Police provide policing within the city of Mississauga and airport. In addition, the Ontario Provincial Police have a Port Credit detachment in the city for patrolling provincial highways. Mississauga Fire and Emergency Services provide fire fighting services and Peel Regional Paramedic Services provides emergency medical services. Toronto Pearson also has its own fire department with two halls that service calls within the airport grounds.

=== Healthcare ===
The city's two main hospitals—Credit Valley Hospital and Mississauga Hospital—were amalgamated into the Trillium Health Partners hospital group in December 2011. The health system and the administration for students in Mississauga was the property of the Peel District School Board Health Centre and the health support for citizens in Mississauga was the property of Peel Health Centre. The eastern part of Mississauga was the property of Pearson Health (Greater Toronto Area Health Department).

== Education ==
=== Primary and secondary ===
Mississauga is served by the Peel District School Board, which operates the secular Anglophone public schools, the Dufferin-Peel Catholic District School Board, which operates Catholic Anglophone public schools, the Conseil scolaire Viamonde, which operates secular Francophone schools, and the Conseil scolaire de district catholique Centre-Sud, which operates Catholic Francophone schools. Within the city, the four boards run a total of more than 150 schools.

Multiple schools in Mississauga also offer specialized programs:

- French immersion schools in multiple locations across the city such as Applewood Heights Secondary School, Clarkson Secondary School and Streetsville Secondary School
- Extended French Program at St. Thomas More School, Lorne Park Secondary School, Philip Pocock Catholic Secondary School and St. Aloysius Gonzaga Secondary School
- Regional Arts Program at Queen Elizabeth Senior Public School, Cawthra Park Secondary School and Iona Catholic Secondary School
- International Business and Technology Program (IBT) at Allan A. Martin Senior Public School, Lisgar Middle School, Medowvale secondary school and Gordon Graydon Memorial Secondary School
- International Baccalaureate Program at St. Francis Xavier Secondary School, Glenforest Secondary School, Bronte College and Erindale Secondary School.
- Sci Tech Program at Tomken Road Middle School and Port Credit Secondary School
- Regional Enhanced Program at Glenforest Secondary School, The Woodlands School and Lorne Park Secondary School.
- Regional Sports Program at Applewood Heights Secondary School
- International and Executive Leadership Academy at TL Kennedy Secondary School

=== Postsecondary ===
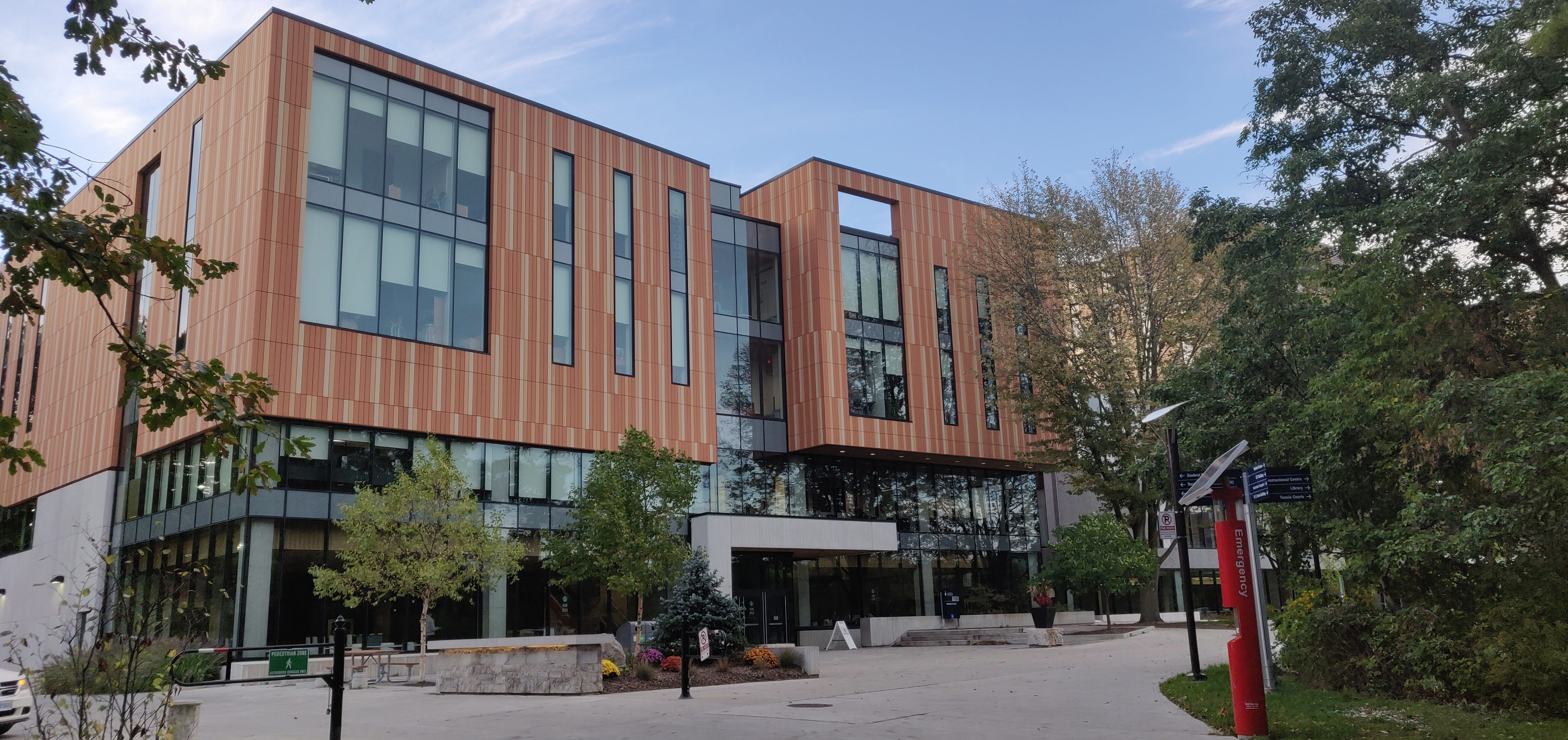
Deerfield Hall at the University of Toronto Mississauga (UTM), located on 225 acres of protected forest near Erin Mills

Since 1967, Mississauga has been home to a large campus of the University of Toronto known as the University of Toronto Mississauga (UTM). The University of Toronto is the largest post-secondary institution in Canada, and its Mississauga campus hosts more than 17,000 students. The campus is an enclave of the Erin Mills neighbourhood, comprising 225 acres of protected forest on the western bank of the Credit River. UTM is the second-largest academic division of the university and has 15 academic departments, more than 180 programs in 90 areas of study, and hosts institutes for Management and Innovation as well as Communication, Culture, Information and Technology. The Mississauga Academy of Medicine (MAM) opened in 2011 as one of the five academies in the university's medical school, the Temerty Faculty of Medicine. MAM is based in the Terrence Donnelly Health Sciences Complex at UTM and maintains a teaching hospital partnership with Trillium Health Partners. UTM employs over 3,400 full- and part-time employees (including 1,250 permanent faculty and staff), and has more than 69,000 alumni all over the world, including astronaut Roberta Bondar, filmmaker Richie Mehta, actor Zaib Shaikh, and writer/poet Dionne Brand. Recent expansions to the campus include the $35-million Innovation Complex, which opened in September 2014 and houses the Institute for Management and Innovation, and the multi-phase North Building reconstruction known as Deerfield Hall and Maanjiwe nendamowinan, opened in September 2014 and 2018 respectively. The latter is an $89-million 210,000 square foot, six-storey facility which houses several academic departments, lecture halls, and study spaces.

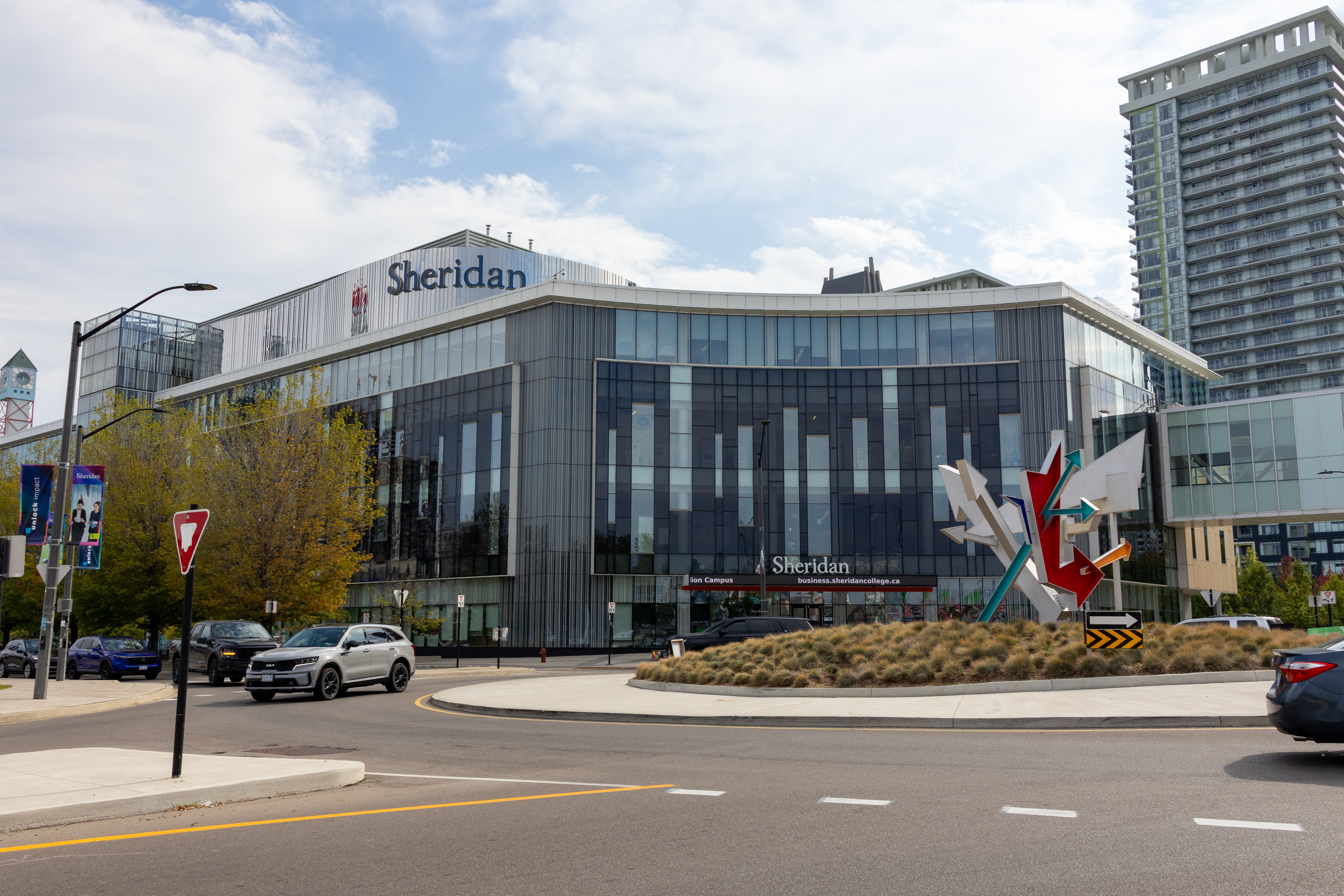
Sheridan College's Hazel McCallion Campus in Mississauga City Centre

Sheridan College opened its $46 million Hazel McCallion Campus in Mississauga in 2011. The facility has two main concentrations: business education, and programs to accelerate the movement of new Canadians into the workforce. The 150,000 sq ft (14,000 m^{2}) campus is located on an 8.5-acre (34,000 m^{2}) parcel of land in City Centre near Square One just north of the Living Arts Centre. The campus accommodated 1,700 students upon completion of phase one of construction in Fall 2011. Phase two of construction after 2011 increased capacity by 3,740 students to a combined total of 5,000; it also included construction of a 10-level municipal parking garage.

== Media ==
Mississauga is part of the Toronto media market and is served by media based in Toronto that caters towards the Greater Toronto Area. However, Mississauga also has The Mississauga News, a regional newspaper that is published two days a week in print and daily online. There is also the Sunday Times, a community newspaper for the South Asian community that is published weekly in print and also available online, and Modern Mississauga, a bi-monthly general-interest print and digital magazine.

The city also has three local radio stations:

- AM 960 CKNT, local news/talk radio
- AM 1650 CINA, multicultural station mainly targeted to Indian and Pakistani audiences.
- FM 91.9 CFRE, the campus radio station of the University of Toronto Mississauga.

The following national cable television stations also broadcast from Mississauga:

- Rogers Television, community channel
- The Shopping Channel, broadcasts nationally from Mississauga
- The Weather Network, broadcast nationally from Mississauga 1998–2005
- Bite TV, Canada's first interactive television station.

== Sister cities ==
Mississauga has two sister cities, Kariya, Aichi, Japan, and Ternopil, Ukraine.

Mississauga and Kariya each have a park and road named after each other. They have been sister cities since 1981.

- Mississauga: Kariya Park (opened July, 1992), and Kariya Drive/Kariya Gate
- Kariya: Mississauga Park (opened 2001), Mississauga Dori & Mississauga Bridge

The Mississauga Friendship Association (MFA) was established in 1993 to assist with the city's twinning program.

Mississauga and Ternopil became sister cities on May 15, 2026. Mississauga renamed Gulleden Park to Ternopil Park in July 2026.

== Freedom of the City ==
The Freedom of the City is the highest honour that a Canadian municipality can bestow on an individual or military unit. The following people and military units have received the Freedom of the City of Mississauga.

=== Individuals ===
- Hazel McCallion: 12 April 2017.
- Bianca Andreescu: 15 September 2019.
- Mohamad Fakih: 15 November 2019.
- Members of the band Triumph (Rik Emmett, Mike Levine and Gil Moore): 25 November 2019.

=== Military units ===
- The Lorne Scots (infantry regiment): 2 July 2014.
- The Toronto Scottish Regiment: 20 September 2014.

== See also ==
- List of tallest buildings in Mississauga
- List of tallest buildings in Ontario
