= Livesay =

Livesay is a surname. Notable people with the surname include:

- A. F. Livesay (died 1879), British architect
- Dorothy Livesay (1909–1996), Canadian poet, daughter of Florence
- Florence Randal Livesay (1874–1953), Canadian writer, mother of Dorothy, born Florence Hamilton Randal
- John Frederick Bligh Livesay (1875–1944), English-born Canadian journalist and author
- Michael Livesay (1936–2003), senior Royal Navy officer
- Richard Livesay (1750–1826), British painter and engraver
- Robert Livesay (1876–1946), British Army officer, rugby international and first-class cricketer

== See also ==
- Livesey (disambiguation)
