= 2022 Mississauga—Lakeshore federal by-election =

Canadian by-election

- December 12, 2022

Riding of Mississauga—Lakeshore
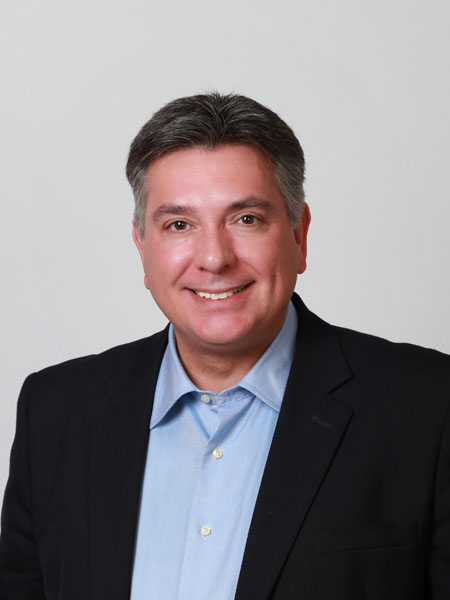
	First party	Second party
		CPC
Candidate	Charles Sousa	Ron Chhinzer
Party	Liberal	Conservative
Popular vote	12,766	9,215
Percentage	51.45%	37.14%
Swing	▲6.50%	▼1.54%

A by-election was held in the federal riding of Mississauga—Lakeshore in Ontario on December 12, 2022, following the resignation of incumbent Liberal MP Sven Spengemann. After 6 years in Parliament, Spengemann resigned on May 27, 2022, to accept a role with the United Nations. The election was won by former Ontario finance minister Charles Sousa.

== Background ==
=== Constituency ===
Mississauga—Lakeshore includes the Mississauga neighbourhoods of Clarkson, Lakeview, Lorne Park, Mineola, Port Credit, Sheridan, Sheridan Park, Southdown and parts of Erindale and Cooksville.

Conservative support is centred in the central part of the riding, particularly in the upscale Lorne Park and Mineola areas, while the Liberals tend to do better along the waterfront of the riding, such as Port Credit and Lakeview, and the eastern and western edges of the riding in neighbourhoods like Clarkson and Sheridan.

=== Representation ===
The riding has been continuously represented by Liberals since 1993, except from between 2011 and 2015 when the riding was held by the Conservatives. Despite its recent history as a Liberal riding, the Liberals have rarely won the riding by large margins since the merger of the Conservative Party in 2003. Starting in 2015, as a part of the overall Liberal dominance of Greater Toronto Area seats and ridings, the riding has gone and stayed Liberal. Incumbent Sven Spengemann successfully defeated Conservative Stella Ambler in 2015 and 2019 and Conservative challenger Michael Ras in the 2021 snap election.

== Campaign ==
The Speaker's warrant regarding the vacancy was received on May 30, 2022; under the Parliament of Canada Act the writ for a by-election had to be dropped no later than November 26, 2022, 180 days after the Chief Electoral Officer was officially notified of the vacancy via a warrant issued by the Speaker. Under the Canada Elections Act, the minimum length of a campaign is 36 days between dropping the writ and election day.

=== Candidates ===
Running for the Liberals is former MPP Charles Sousa, who represented the area provincially from 2007 to 2018 and previously served in the provincial cabinets of Dalton McGuinty and Kathleen Wynne, including as Minister of Finance from 2013 to 2018. Alex Crombie, a former Queen's Park staffer and son of Mississauga mayor Bonnie Crombie, was seen as a potential candidate prior to Sousa's nomination.

Running for the Conservatives is Ron Chhinzer, a police officer of 20 years. As a police officer, Chhinzer was a founding member of the Toronto Police Service's Integrated Gang Prevention Task Force, which was involved in implementing the city's gang exit strategy. Former Conservative candidate Michael Ras, who finished second to Spengemann in 2021, considered running for the nomination before declining on social media.

The NDP has nominated Julia Kole, who ran for the seat's provincial counterpart in the provincial election earlier in the year. Julia previously worked as a Constituency Assistant for an MPP in Brampton. She holds a BA in accounting and an MSc in Environmental Policy and Management.

Running for the Green Party is Mary Kidnew, the founder of the Mississauga-Lakeshore Green Party Electoral District Association (EDA), known community advocate and a past president of the Hillcrest Ratepayers Association.

The People's Party nominated Khaled Al-Sudani as their candidate.

Rhinoceros Party leader Sébastien CoRhino will contest the by-election.

The Longest Ballot Committee organized a protest against the Trudeau government's abandonment of electoral reform in 2017 by running thirty-three independent candidates, breaking their own record for most candidates nominated in a single riding in Canada, previously set in the riding of Saint Boniface—Saint Vital in the 2021 Canadian federal election.

=== Polling ===
Polling Firm	Last Date of Polling	Link	LPC	CPC	NDP	GPC	PPC	Others	Undecided	Margin of Error^{[1]}	Sample Size^{[2]}	Polling Method^{[3]}
Mainstreet Research	October 27, 2022	PDF	40.5	37.9	6.4	5.3	1.1	1.7	13.2	±4.3 pp	521	IVR
Mainstreet Research	October 27, 2022	PDF	43.5	40.8	6.9	5.7	1.2	1.9	—N/a	±4.3 pp	521	IVR
Mainstreet Research	December 8, 2022	PDF	47.5	38.8	6.0	4.6	3.1	2	1.5	±5.9 pp	279	IVR
Mainstreet Research	December 8, 2022	PDF	48.7	39.8	4.7	3.2	2.1	1.5	—N/a	±5.9 pp	279	IVR

== Results ==
Canadian federal by-election, December 12, 2022: Mississauga—Lakeshore Resignation of Sven Spengemann
Party	Candidate	Votes	%	±%	Expenditures
Liberal	Charles Sousa	12,766	51.45	+6.50	
Conservative	Ron Chhinzer	9,215	37.14	-1.54	
New Democratic	Julia Kole	1,231	4.96	-4.79	
Green	Mary Kidnew	792	3.19	+0.94	
People's	Khaled Al-Sudani	293	1.18	-3.03	
Independent	Sean Carson	48	0.19	—	
Independent	Charles Currie	44	0.18	—	
Independent	Patrick Strzalkowski	38	0.15	—	
Independent	Peter House	31	0.12	—	
Independent	Mélodie Anderson	29	0.12	—	
Rhinoceros	Sébastien CoRhino	24	0.10	-0.07	
Independent	Conrad Lukawski	23	0.09	—	
Independent	Adam Smith	23	0.09	—	
Independent	Stephen Davis	21	0.08	—	
Independent	Marie-Hélène LeBel	17	0.07	—	
Independent	Eliana Rosenblum	17	0.07	—	
Independent	Myriam Beaulieu	16	0.06	—	
Independent	Roger Sherwood	14	0.06	—	
Independent	John The Engineer Turmel	14	0.06	—	
Independent	Jevin David Carroll	12	0.05	—	
Independent	Spencer Rocchi	12	0.05	—	
Independent	Tomas Szuchewycz	12	0.05	—	
Independent	Julie St-Amand	11	0.04	—	
Independent	Mark Dejewski	11	0.04	—	
Independent	Julian Selody	10	0.04	—	
Independent	Ben Teichman	10	0.04	—	
Independent	Mylène Bonneau	9	0.04	—	
Independent	Kerri Hildebrandt	9	0.04	—	
Independent	Line Bélanger	8	0.03	—	
Independent	Alexandra Engering	8	0.03	—	
Independent	Samuel Jubinville	8	0.03	—	
Independent	Jean-Denis Parent Boudreault	7	0.03	—	
Independent	Daniel Gagnon	7	0.03	—	
Independent	Darcy Justin Vanderwater	6	0.02	—	
Independent	Donovan Eckstrom	5	0.02	—	
Independent	Donald Gagnon	5	0.02	—	
Independent	Martin Acetaria Caesar Jubinville	3	0.01	—	
Independent	Ysack Dupont	2	0.01	—	
Independent	Pascal St-Amand	2	0.01	—	
Independent	Alain Lamontagne	1	0.00	—	
Total valid votes		24,814			
Total rejected ballots		135	0.54		
Turnout		24,949	27.76		
Eligible voters		89,863			
Liberal hold		Swing		+4.02	
Source: Elections Canada

== 2021 result ==
2021 Canadian federal election
Party	Candidate	Votes	%	±%
Liberal	Sven Spengemann	25,284	44.94	-3.14
Conservative	Michael Ras	21,761	38.68	+1.65
New Democratic	Sarah Walji	5,488	9.75	+1.44
People's	Vahid Seyfaie	2,367	4.21	+3.04
Green	Elizabeth Robertson	1,265	2.25	-2.33
Rhinoceros	Kayleigh Tahk	94	0.17	-
Total valid votes		56,259		
Total rejected ballots		524	0.92	
Turnout		56,783	63.82	
Eligible voters		88,977		
Liberal hold		Swing		-2.40
Source: Elections Canada
