= Mississauga—Lakeshore (federal electoral district) =

Federal electoral district in Ontario, Canada

Coordinates: 43.554°N 79.610°W

Ontario electoral district
- Interactive map of riding boundaries from the 2025

Federal electoral district
- Legislature: House of Commons
MP
Charles Sousa
Liberal
- District created: 1976
- First contested: 1979
- Last contested: 2025 federal election
- District webpage: profile, map

Demographics
- Population (2011): 118,893
- Electors (2015): 85,379
- Area (km²): 92
- Pop. density (per km²): 1,292.3
- Census division: Peel
- Census subdivision: Mississauga

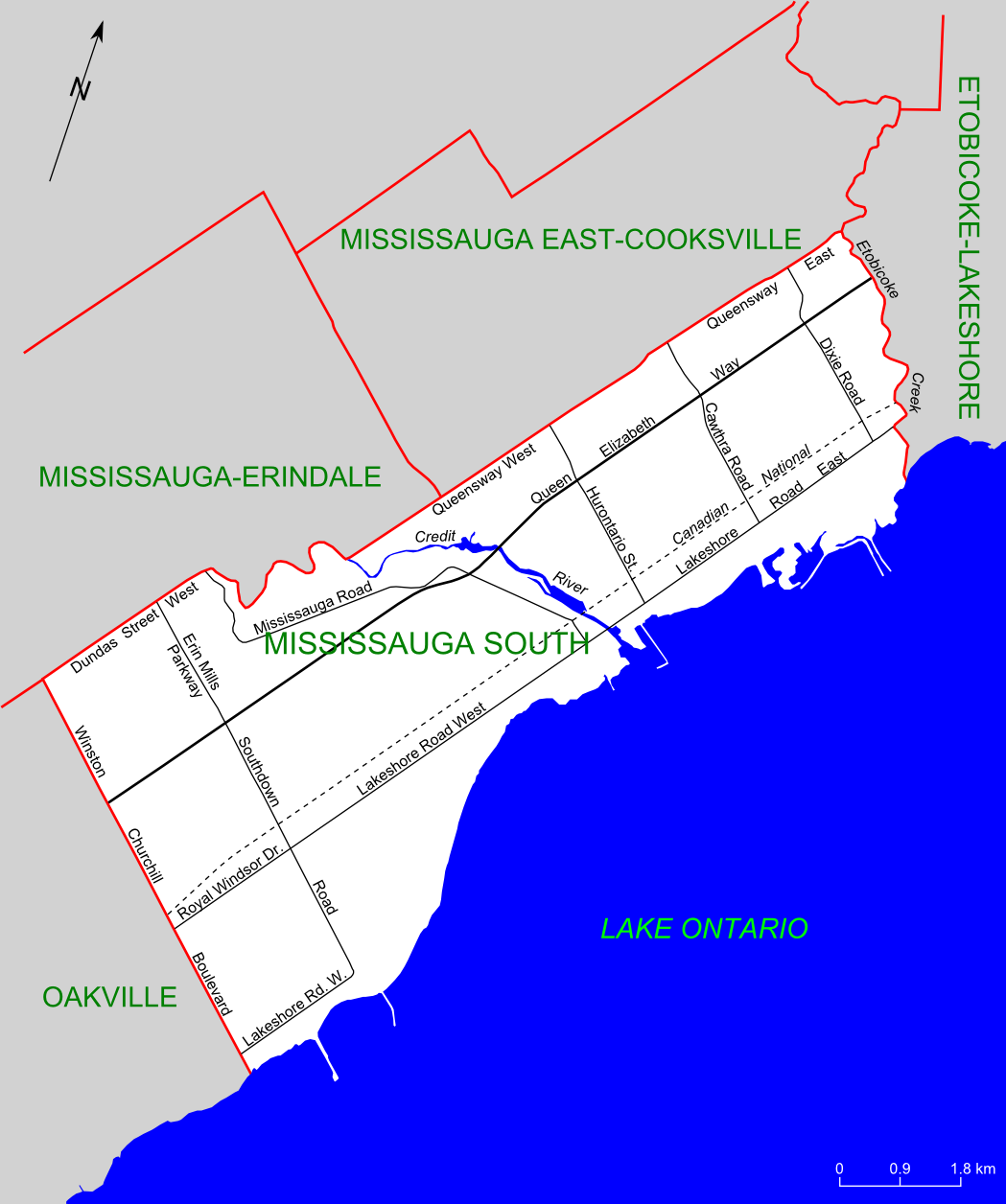
Map of Mississauga—Lakeshore (formerly Mississauga South)

Mississauga—Lakeshore (formerly Mississauga South) is a federal electoral district in Peel Region, Ontario, Canada. It has been represented in the House of Commons of Canada since 1979.

== Geography ==
The riding includes the Mississauga neighbourhoods of Clarkson, Lakeview, Lorne Park, Mineola, Port Credit, Sheridan, Sheridan Park, Southdown and parts of Erindale and Cooksville.

== Demographics ==
According to the 2021 Canadian census

Ethnic groups: 63.7% White, 10.1% South Asian, 5.1% Chinese, 4.9% Black, 3.3% Arab, 3.3% Filipino, 1.9% Latin American, 1.5% Southeast Asian, 1.3% Indigenous, 1.2% West Asian
Languages: 65.5% English, 4.1% Polish, 2.4% Mandarin, 2.4% Arabic, 2.2% Portuguese, 2.0% Urdu, 1.9% French, 1.9% Spanish, 1.8% Italian, 1.5% Tagalog, 1.3% Serbo-Croatian
Religions: 58.5% Christian (34.8% Catholic, 3.9% Anglican, 3.6% Christian Orthodox, 3.3% United Church, 1.4% Presbyterian, 1.1% Baptist, 11.6% Others), 8.9% Muslim, 3.1% Hindu, 1.1% Buddhist, 26.4% No religion
Median income (2020): $45,600
Average income (2020): $73,900

== Political geography ==
Conservative support is centred in the central part of the riding, particularly in the upscale Lorne Park and Mineola areas, while the Liberals tend to do better along the waterfront of the riding, such as Port Credit and Lakeview, and the eastern and western edges of the riding in neighbourhoods like Clarkson and Sheridan.

== History ==
The federal riding was created in 1976 from parts of Mississauga.

It consisted initially of the part of the City of Mississauga lying south of a line drawn from west to east along Highway 5 (Dundas Street), south along Cawthra Road, and east along the Queen Elizabeth Way.

In 1987, it was redefined to consist of the part of the City of Mississauga lying south of a line drawn from southwest to northeast along Dundas Street West, east along the Credit River, northeast along the Queen Elizabeth Way, northwest along Cawthra Road, and northeast along the Queensway East to the eastern city limit.

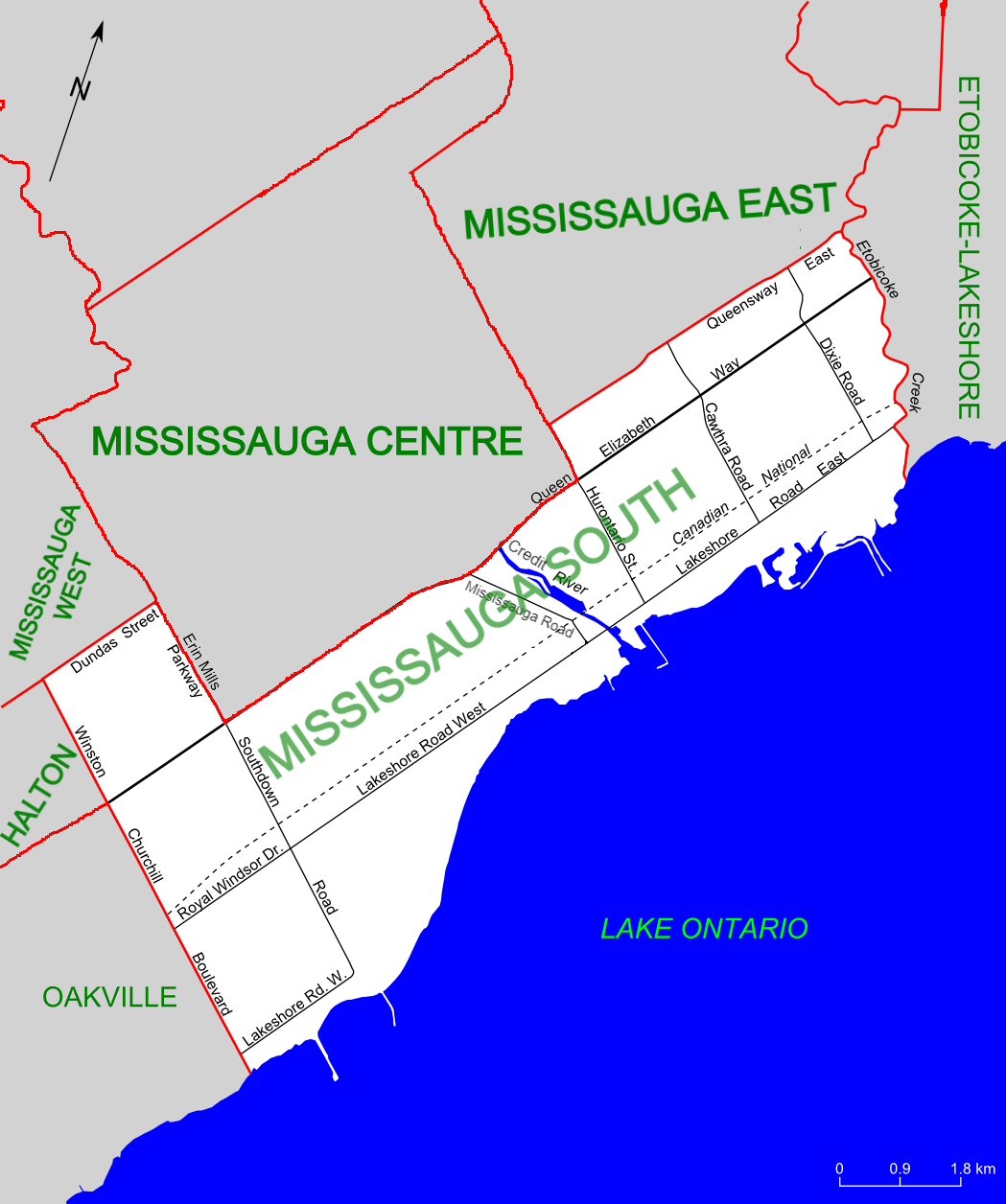
Map of the riding (1996 boundaries)

In 1996, it was redefined to consist of the part of the City of Mississauga lying south of a line drawn from southwest to northeast along Dundas Street West, southeast along Erin Mills Parkway, northeast along the Queen Elizabeth Way, northwest along Hurontario Street, northeast along the Queensway East to the northeastern city limit.

In 2003, it was given its current boundaries as described above.

In 2013, the riding gained the area around Huron Park, and was renamed Mississauga—Lakeshore. It was defined to consist of the part of the City of Mississauga lying southeast of a line drawn from northeast to southwest along the Queensway to Mavis Road, north along Mavis Road until Dundas Street and west along Dundas Street to the southwestern city limit.

Since the 2015 Canadian Federal election, the Liberal Party of Canada has succeeded in holding Mississauga—Lakeshore as they have done in 2015, 2019 and 2021 elections with significant margins over 45%. This trend is aligned with the continued Liberal Party of Canada's dominance of Greater Toronto Area politics and seats.

Following the 2022 Canadian federal electoral redistribution, at the first election held after approximately April 2024, It will gain part of Mississauga East—Cooksville south of Dundas Street and west of Stillmeadow Road.

== Electoral history ==
The Mississauga South riding and its precursors, while being more competitive than in provincial elections, still has a generally conservative history, and despite voting Liberal since 1993, could be described as a small "c" conservative riding. The Progressive Conservatives held the riding from creation its first election in 1979 under Don Blenkarn, (who served as MP for Peel South, one of the precursor ridings between 1972 and 1974), until 1993, when he was defeated by Paul Szabo. With the exception of the 1988 election, Szabo has been the Liberal candidate in all election between 1980 (an election he almost won) and 2011.

The riding voting Liberal in 1993 can in part be blamed by vote-splitting on the right, as Blenkarn was knocked into third place by the Reform Party candidate, although both were far behind Szabo, who only marginally improved on the Liberal performance from 1988, winning 37%, only 2% more than the 1988 Liberal result, and less than the combined vote total for the two right-wing parties. Szabo however greatly increased his percentage of the vote in the elections afterward, winning over 50% in every election from 1997 to 2004, despite facing a united right-wing vote in 2004.

In the 2006 election Szabo and the Liberals were re-elected again; however, the Liberal vote dropped sharply, with the Conservatives coming within 5% of winning the riding, getting 40% of the vote, one of the best performances for them in the Greater Toronto Area. The riding was generally assumed to be a top Tory target for the next election; however, the drawn-out and somewhat acrimonious nature of the Conservative nomination process, and Szabo's increased profile as a result of his chairmanship of the House of Commons Ethics committee may have damaged Conservative attempts to capture the riding. Despite the Conservatives strengthening in the 2008 election overall, Arrison was unable to defeat Szabo, and Mississauga South was one of the few ridings outside Quebec where the Liberal Party increased the percentage of the vote received from 2006 (albeit very slightly).

From 2011 to 2015 the riding was held by the Conservatives, however, starting in 2015 as a part of the overall Liberal dominance of Greater Toronto Area seats and ridings, the riding has gone and stayed Liberal. Incumbent Sven Spengemann defeated Conservative Stella Ambler in 2015 and 2019 and Conservative challenger Michael Ras in the 2021 snap election.

In May 2022, Spengemann announced his resignation in order to accept a position with the United Nations, prompting a by-election. Throughout the summer the Conservatives nominated Peel Police officer and gang prevention expert Ron Chhinzer, the NDP put forward Julia Kole - a party staffer, and the Greens nominated Mary Kidnew - a climate activist.

By November the Liberals nominated Charles Sousa, former Ontario Finance Minister (2013-2018) and MPP for Mississauga—Lakeshore (2007-2018), and by the following days, Prime Minister Justin Trudeau called the by-election (November 12) for an election day of December 12.

Sousa won the by-election soundly on Monday, December 12, 2022, capturing just over 51% of the vote which is the highest Liberal vote share in Mississauga—Lakeshore in years. The Conservatives trailed with 37% of the vote with the NDP and Greens collecting last than 5% of the vote, respectively.

== Riding associations ==
Riding associations are the local branches of political parties:

Party	Association name	CEO	HQ City
Conservative	Mississauga—Lakeshore Conservative Association	Gregory Richard Delbridge	Mississauga
Green	Mississauga—Lakeshore Green Party Association	Mary Kidnew	Mississauga
Liberal	Mississauga—Lakeshore Federal Liberal Association	Adam Larouche	Mississauga
New Democratic	Mississauga—Lakeshore Federal NDP Riding Association	Julia Kole	Mississauga

== Members of Parliament ==
This riding has elected the following members of the House of Commons of Canada:

Parliament	Years	Member	Party
Mississauga South; Riding created from Mississauga
31st	1979–1980	Don Blenkarn	Progressive Conservative
32nd	1980–1984	Don Blenkarn	Progressive Conservative
33rd	1984–1988	Don Blenkarn	Progressive Conservative
34th	1988–1993	Don Blenkarn	Progressive Conservative
35th	1993–1997	Paul Szabo	Liberal
36th	1997–2000	Paul Szabo	Liberal
37th	2000–2004	Paul Szabo	Liberal
38th	2004–2006	Paul Szabo	Liberal
39th	2006–2008	Paul Szabo	Liberal
40th	2008–2011	Paul Szabo	Liberal
41st	2011–2015	Stella Ambler	Conservative
Mississauga—Lakeshore
42nd	2015–2019	Sven Spengemann	Liberal
43rd	2019–2021	Sven Spengemann	Liberal
44th	2021–2022	Sven Spengemann	Liberal
44th	2022–2025	Charles Sousa	Liberal
45th	2025–present	Charles Sousa	Liberal

== Election results ==
View source data.
Graph of election results in Mississauga South, Mississauga—Lakeshore (minor parties that never got 2% of the vote or didn't run consistently are omitted)

=== Mississauga—Lakeshore (2013-present) ===
2025 Canadian federal election
Party	Candidate	Votes	%	±%	Expenditures
Liberal	Charles Sousa	34,971	52.40	+7.39	$138,569.53
Conservative	Tom Ellard	29,416	43.98	+5.40	$119,683.13
New Democratic	Evelyn Butler	1,254	1.88	–7.89	$4,398.25
Green	Mary Kidnew	587	0.89	–1.31	$0.00
People's	Fahad Rao	334	0.50	–3.76	$5,514.10
Independent	Carlton Darby	122	0.18	N/A	$1,607.78
Marxist–Leninist	Anna Di Carlo	113	0.17	N/A	$0.00
Total valid votes/expense limit		66,797	99.53	–	$139,892.77
Total rejected ballots		317	0.47		
Turnout		67,114	70.48		
Eligible voters		95,220			
Liberal notional hold		Swing		+1.00	
Source: Elections Canada
Note: Change in percentage value and swing are calculated from the redistributed results of the 2021 general election, not the 2022 by-election.

2021 federal election redistributed results
Party	Vote	%
Liberal	25,822	45.01
Conservative	22,134	38.58
New Democratic	5,606	9.77
People's	2,444	4.26
Green	1,265	2.20
Others	101	0.18

Canadian federal by-election, December 12, 2022 Resignation of Sven Spengemann
Party	Candidate	Votes	%	±%	Expenditures
Liberal	Charles Sousa	12,766	51.45	+6.50	
Conservative	Ron Chhinzer	9,215	37.14	-1.54	
New Democratic	Julia Kole	1,231	4.96	-4.79	
Green	Mary Kidnew	792	3.19	+0.94	
People's	Khaled Al-Sudani	293	1.18	-3.03	
Independent	Sean Carson	48	0.19	—	
Independent	Charles Currie	44	0.18	—	
Independent	Patrick Strzalkowski	38	0.15	—	
Independent	Peter House	31	0.12	—	
Independent	Mélodie Anderson	29	0.12	—	
Rhinoceros	Sébastien CoRhino	24	0.10	-0.07	
Independent	Conrad Lukawski	23	0.09	—	
Independent	Adam Smith	23	0.09	—	
Independent	Stephen Davis	21	0.08	—	
Independent	Marie-Hélène LeBel	17	0.07	—	
Independent	Eliana Rosenblum	17	0.07	—	
Independent	Myriam Beaulieu	16	0.06	—	
Independent	Roger Sherwood	14	0.06	—	
Independent	John The Engineer Turmel	14	0.06	—	
Independent	Jevin David Carroll	12	0.05	—	
Independent	Spencer Rocchi	12	0.05	—	
Independent	Tomas Szuchewycz	12	0.05	—	
Independent	Julie St-Amand	11	0.04	—	
Independent	Mark Dejewski	11	0.04	—	
Independent	Julian Selody	10	0.04	—	
Independent	Ben Teichman	10	0.04	—	
Independent	Mylène Bonneau	9	0.04	—	
Independent	Kerri Hildebrandt	9	0.04	—	
Independent	Line Bélanger	8	0.03	—	
Independent	Alexandra Engering	8	0.03	—	
Independent	Samuel Jubinville	8	0.03	—	
Independent	Jean-Denis Parent Boudreault	7	0.03	—	
Independent	Daniel Gagnon	7	0.03	—	
Independent	Darcy Justin Vanderwater	6	0.02	—	
Independent	Donovan Eckstrom	5	0.02	—	
Independent	Donald Gagnon	5	0.02	—	
Independent	Martin Acetaria Caesar Jubinville	3	0.01	—	
Independent	Ysack Dupont	2	0.01	—	
Independent	Pascal St-Amand	2	0.01	—	
Independent	Alain Lamontagne	1	0.00	—	
Total valid votes		24,814			
Total rejected ballots		135	0.54		
Turnout		24,949	27.76		
Eligible voters		89,863			
Liberal hold		Swing		+4.02	
Source: Elections Canada

2021 Canadian federal election
Party	Candidate	Votes	%	±%	Expenditures
Liberal	Sven Spengemann	25,284	44.94	-3.46	$100,636.46
Conservative	Michael Ras	21,761	38.68	+1.40	$95,632.95
New Democratic	Sarah Walji	5,488	9.75	+1.39	$6.00
People's	Vahid Seyfaie	2,367	4.21	+3.03	$646.34
Green	Elizabeth Robertson	1,265	2.25	-2.36	$1,660.10
Rhinoceros	Kayleigh Tahk	94	0.17	-	$8.07
Total valid votes/expense limit		56,259	99.08	–	$117,701.69
Total rejected ballots		524	0.92	+0.26	
Turnout		56,783	63.79	-4.12	
Eligible voters		89,017			
Liberal hold		Swing		-2.43	
Source: Elections Canada

2019 Canadian federal election
Party	Candidate	Votes	%	±%	Expenditures
Liberal	Sven Spengemann	29,526	48.40	+0.69	$104,588.59
Conservative	Stella Ambler	22,740	37.28	-3.95	$110,262.85
New Democratic	Adam Laughton	5,103	8.37	+0.38	none listed
Green	Cynthia Trentelman	2,814	4.61	+2.26	$2,524.73
People's	Eugen Vizitiu	717	1.18	-	none listed
United	Carlton Darby	99	0.16	-	$0.00
Total valid votes		60,999	99.34		
Total rejected ballots		407	0.66	+0.21	
Turnout		61,406	67.91	-0.79	
Eligible voters		90,419			
Liberal hold		Swing		+2.32	
Source: Elections Canada

2015 Canadian federal election
Party	Candidate	Votes	%	±%	Expenditures
Liberal	Sven Spengemann	28,279	47.71	+10.86	$74,169.40
Conservative	Stella Ambler	24,435	41.22	-5.68	$221,638.11
New Democratic	Eric Guerbilsky	4,735	7.99	-4.80	$6,908.86
Green	Ariana Burgener	1,397	2.36	-0.72	$1,924.23
Libertarian	Paul Wodworth	316	0.53	-	$1,166.63
Marxist–Leninist	Dagmar Sullivan	111	0.19	-	
Total valid votes/expense limit		59,273	99.54	-	$224,818.71
Total rejected ballots		271	0.46		
Turnout		59,544	68.70		
Eligible voters		86,675			
Liberal gain from Conservative		Swing		+8.27	

2011 federal election redistributed results
Party	Vote	%
Conservative	24,269	46.91
Liberal	19,068	36.85
New Democratic	6,616	12.79
Green	1,592	3.08
Others	195	0.38

=== Mississauga South (1976-2013) ===
View source data.
Graph of election results in Mississauga South (minor parties that never got 2% of the vote or didn't run consistently are omitted)

2011 Canadian federal election
Party	Candidate	Votes	%	±%	Expenditures
Conservative	Stella Ambler	22,991	46.48	+6.89	
Liberal	Paul Szabo	18,393	37.18	-7.04	
New Democratic	Farah Kalbouneh	6,354	12.85	+4.00	
Green	Paul Simas	1,532	3.10	-4.25	
Independent	Richard Barrett	194	0.39	–	
Total valid votes		49,464	99.62		
Total rejected ballots		188	0.38	+0.05	
Turnout		49,652	63.21	+3.13	
Eligible voters		78,551	–	–	
Conservative gain from Liberal		Swing		+6.97	

2008 Canadian federal election
Party	Candidate	Votes	%	±%	Expenditures
Liberal	Paul Szabo	20,518	44.22	+0.05	$70,011
Conservative	Hugh Arrison	18,366	39.59	-0.50	$81,878
New Democratic	Matt Turner	4,104	8.85	-1.91	$1,722
Green	Richard Laushway	3,407	7.34	+2.75	$9,008
Total valid votes/Expense limit		46,395	99.67	$84,179	
Total rejected ballots		155	0.33	-0.10	
Turnout		46,550	60.08	-8.23	
Eligible voters		77,479	–	–	
Liberal hold		Swing		+0.28	

2006 Canadian federal election
Party	Candidate	Votes	%	±%
Liberal	Paul Szabo	23,018	44.17	-7.50
Conservative	Phil Green	20,888	40.09	+6.46
New Democratic	Mark De Pelham	5,607	10.76	+0.26
Green	Brendan Tarry	2,393	4.59	+0.61
Canadian Action	Paul McMurray	129	0.25	
Marxist–Leninist	Dagmar Sullivan	74	0.14	-0.08
Total valid votes		52,109	99.56	
Total rejected ballots		229	0.44	+0.06
Turnout		52,338	68.31	+5.24
Eligible voters		76,614	–	–
Liberal hold		Swing		-6.98

2004 Canadian federal election
Party	Candidate	Votes	%	±%
Liberal	Paul Szabo	24,628	51.67	-0.14
Conservative	Phil Green	16,027	33.62	-9.14
New Democratic	Michael James Culkin	5,004	10.50	+6.51
Green	Neeraj Jain	1,899	3.98	
Marxist–Leninist	Dagmar Sullivan	107	0.22	
Total valid votes		47,665	99.62	
Total rejected ballots		183	0.38	
Turnout		47,848	63.07	
Eligible voters		75,866	–	–
Liberal hold		Swing		+4.50

Note: Conservative vote is compared to the total of the Canadian Alliance vote and Progressive Conservative vote in 2000 election. Change is based on redistributed results.

2000 federal election redistributed results
Party	Vote	%
Liberal	22,249	51.81
Canadian Alliance	10,809	25.17
Progressive Conservative	7,555	17.59
New Democratic	1,712	3.99
Others	620	1.44

2000 Canadian federal election
Party	Candidate	Votes	%	±%
Liberal	Paul Szabo	20,676	51.8	+1.8
Alliance	Brad Butt	10,139	25.4	+5.8
Progressive Conservative	David Brown	6,903	17.3	-6.4
New Democratic	Ken Cole	1,636	4.1	-1.3
Green	Pamela Murray	516	1.3	
Marxist–Leninist	Tim Sullivan	67	0.2	0.0
Total valid votes		39,937	100.0	

Note: Canadian Alliance vote is compared to the Reform vote in 1997 election.

1997 Canadian federal election
Party	Candidate	Votes	%	±%
Liberal	Paul Szabo	21,207	49.9	+3.4
Progressive Conservative	Dick Barr	10,077	23.7	+0.4
Reform	Joe Peschisolido	8,307	19.6	-5.6
New Democratic	Jessica Lott	2,302	5.4	+3.3
Natural Law	Scott Kay	199	0.5	0.0
Canadian Action	Aaron Gervais	150	0.4	
Independent	Adrian Earl Crewson	141	0.3	
Marxist–Leninist	Dagmar Sullivan	79	0.2	+0.1
Total valid votes		42,462	100.0	

1993 Canadian federal election
Party	Candidate	Votes	%	±%
Liberal	Paul Szabo	21,480	46.6	+11.9
Reform	John Veenstra	11,591	25.1	
Progressive Conservative	Don Blenkarn	10,763	23.3	-28.6
New Democratic	Lili V. Weemen	988	2.1	-9.8
National	Albina Burello	452	1.0	
Libertarian	Richard Barrett	429	0.9	+0.3
Natural Law	Jeffrey graduate Dods	234	0.5	
Independent	Michael John Charette	124	0.3	
Marxist–Leninist	Dagmar Sullivan	49	0.1	
Total valid votes		46,110	100.0	

1988 Canadian federal election
Party	Candidate	Votes	%	±%
Progressive Conservative	Don Blenkarn	24,482	51.9	-4.5
Liberal	Gil Gillespie	16,362	34.7	+5.8
New Democratic	Sue Craig	5,643	12.0	-2.7
Rhinoceros	Marc Currie	332	0.7	
Libertarian	Vay Jonynas	297	0.6	
Commonwealth of Canada	Patrick Descoteaux	59	0.1	
Total valid votes		47,175	100.0	

1984 Canadian federal election
Party	Candidate	Votes	%	±%
Progressive Conservative	Don Blenkarn	32,946	56.4	+15.0
Liberal	Paul Szabo	16,874	28.9	-11.6
New Democratic	Norm Jones	8,584	14.7	-2.1
Total valid votes		58,404	100.0	

1980 Canadian federal election
Party	Candidate	Votes	%	±%
Progressive Conservative	Don Blenkarn	21,480	41.4	-7.5
Liberal	Paul Szabo	21,007	40.5	+6.4
New Democratic	Neil Davis	8,711	16.8	+0.6
Libertarian	Ian F. Darwin	405	0.8	+0.4
Independent	Tom Smith	110	0.2	0.0
Independent	Michael John Charette	78	0.2	
Marxist–Leninist	Tim Sullivan	31	0.1	-0.1
Total valid votes		51,822	100.0	

1979 Canadian federal election
Party	Candidate	Votes	%
Progressive Conservative	Don Blenkarn	26,802	48.9
Liberal	Peg Holloway	18,710	34.1
New Democratic	Colin Baynes	8,869	16.2
Libertarian	Robert Sproule	236	0.4
Independent	Tom Smith	104	0.2
Marxist–Leninist	Barbara Nunn	74	0.1
Total valid votes		54,795	100.0

== See also ==
- List of Canadian electoral districts
- Historical federal electoral districts of Canada
