= Stella Ambler =

Canadian politician

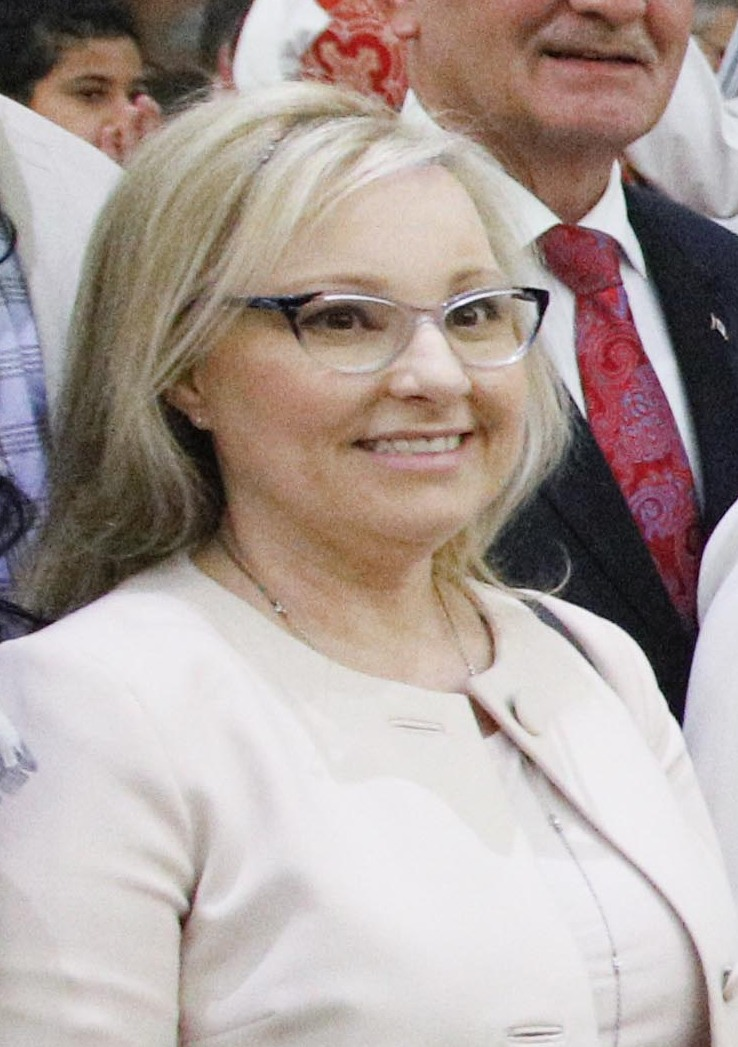

Member of Parliament for Mississauga South
- In office May 2, 2011 – August 4, 2015
- Preceded by: Paul Szabo
- Succeeded by: Sven Spengemann

Personal details
- Born: September 29, 1966 (age 60) Etobicoke, Ontario, Canada
- Party: Conservative
- Spouse: Richard Ambler
- Education: St. Michael's College, Toronto
- Profession: Civil servant

Stella Ambler (born September 29, 1966) is a Canadian politician who served as the Member of Parliament for the federal electoral district of Mississauga South from 2011 to 2015. She is a member of the Conservative Party.

== Background ==
Ambler's parents are Italian immigrants who met and married in Canada, settling in Etobicoke then moving to Brampton. She obtained a degree in psychology from the University of Toronto. Ambler married her husband, Richard Ambler, in 1992. She worked as a political advisor to the Ontario government but left this position to stay at home and raise her children for nine years. They lived in Brampton together before moving to Mississauga's Lorne Park neighbourhood.

== Politics ==
Ambler was the Director of Regional Affairs (Greater Toronto Area) to the Minister responsible for Ontario, the former Finance Minister Jim Flaherty. She ran in the 2008 federal election in the riding of Bramalea—Gore—Malton, but was defeated by Liberal Gurbax Singh Malhi. In the 2011 election she defeated Liberal MP Paul Szabo in the riding of Mississauga South. Both Szabo and Ambler are strong supporters of the movement to criminalize abortion services. Ambler was a backbench MP in the Stephen Harper government.

In 2013, Ambler was appointed Chair of the Special Committee on Violence Against Indigenous Women. A year later, the Committee released a report on the issue of missing and murdered Aboriginal women that called for more action on the issue. Critics of the report complained that the report failed to recommend the establishment of a national inquiry into the issue. The Liberals campaigned on establishing such an inquiry. The Trudeau government established the Inquiry immediately after defeating the Harper Conservatives.

Ambler is a supporter of the anti-abortion movement. In 2012, she voted in favour of a private member's bill sponsored by Stephen Woodworth that sought to review the definition of conception under the criminal code. In 2013, she voted in favour of another private member's bill that sought to ban sex-selective abortions. In May 2015, she participated in a rally that urged demonstrators to vote for anti-abortion candidates in the upcoming election. After this, in the 2019 federal election, she ran again as the Conservative candidate for Mississauga—Lakeshore but was defeated by Sven Spengemann.

Ambler was the Conservative candidate in the 2015 election for the new riding of Mississauga—Lakeshore. On August 4, 2015, she was defeated by Sven Spengemann in the 42nd general election.

In 2020, Stella moved to the town of Wasaga Beach, Ontario. On November 27, 2020, it was reported that she launched her campaign to become the next candidate for the Progressive Conservative Party of Ontario to represent the riding of Simcoe—Grey.

== Electoral record ==
2019 Canadian federal election: Mississauga—Lakeshore
| Party | Candidate | Votes | % | ±% | Expenditures |
|---|---|---|---|---|---|
| Liberal | Sven Spengemann | 29,526 | 48.40 | +0.69 | $104,588.59 |
| Conservative | Stella Ambler | 22,740 | 37.28 | -3.95 | $110,262.85 |
| New Democratic | Adam Laughton | 5,103 | 8.37 | +0.38 | none listed |
| Green | Cynthia Trentelman | 2,814 | 4.61 | +2.26 | $2,524.73 |
| People's | Eugen Vizitiu | 717 | 1.18 | - | none listed |
| United | Carlton Darby | 99 | 0.16 | - | $0.00 |
| Total valid votes | | 60,999 | 99.34 | | |
| Total rejected ballots | | 407 | 0.66 | +0.21 | |
| Turnout | | 61,406 | 67.91 | -0.79 | |
| Eligible voters | | 90,419 | | | |
| Liberal hold | | Swing | | +2.32 | |
Source: Elections Canada

2015 Canadian federal election
| Party | Candidate | Votes | % | ±% | Expenditures |
|---|---|---|---|---|---|
| Liberal | Sven Spengemann | 28,279 | 47.71 | +10.86 | $74,169.40 |
| Conservative | Stella Ambler | 24,435 | 41.22 | -5.68 | $221,638.11 |
| New Democratic | Eric Guerbilsky | 4,735 | 7.99 | -4.80 | $6,908.86 |
| Green | Ariana Burgener | 1,397 | 2.36 | -0.72 | $1,924.23 |
| Libertarian | Paul Wodworth | 316 | 0.53 | - | $1,166.63 |
| Marxist–Leninist | Dagmar Sullivan | 111 | 0.19 | - | |
| Total valid votes/expense limit | | 59,273 | 100.00 | - | $224,818.71 |
| Total rejected ballots | | 271 | 0.46 | | |
| Turnout | | 59,544 | 68.99 | | |
| Eligible voters | | 86,308 | – | – | |
| Liberal gain from Conservative | | Swing | | +8.27 | |

2011 Canadian federal election
| Party | Candidate | Votes | % | ±% | Expenditures |
|---|---|---|---|---|---|
| Conservative | Stella Ambler | 22,991 | 46.48 | +6.90 | |
| Liberal | Paul Szabo | 18,393 | 37.18 | -7.04 | |
| New Democratic | Farah Kalbouneh | 6,354 | 12.85 | +4.01 | |
| Green | Paul Simas | 1,532 | 3.10 | -4.24 | |
| Independent | Richard Barrett | 194 | 0.39 | – | |
| Total valid votes | | 49,464 | 100.00 | | |
| Total rejected ballots | | 188 | 0.38 | +0.05 | |
| Turnout | | 49,652 | 63.89 | +3.81 | |
| Eligible voters | | 77,716 | – | – | |

2008 Canadian federal election
| Party | Candidate | Votes | % | ±% | Expenditures |
|---|---|---|---|---|---|
| Liberal | Gurbax Singh Malhi | 22,272 | 45.05 | -5.7 | $85,496 |
| Conservative | Stella Ambler | 18,353 | 37.12 | +4.6 | $91,704 |
| New Democratic | Jash Puniya | 5,945 | 12.02 | -0.8 | $21,613 |
| Green | Mark Pajot | 2,551 | 5.16 | +1.8 | $869 |
| Marxist–Leninist | Frank Chilelli | 309 | 0.62 | +0.1 | |
| Total valid votes/Expense limit | | 49,430 | 100.00 | $97,671 | |
| Total rejected ballots | | 307 | 0.62 | – | |
| Turnout | | 49,737 | 49.74 | – | – |
