= Tony Abbott (Ontario politician) =

Canadian lawyer and politician (1930–2023)

The Honourable Anthony Chisholm Abbott PC

Member of the Canadian Parliament for Mississauga
- In office 1974–1979
- Preceded by: Don Blenkarn
- Succeeded by: District abolished

Personal details
- Born: November 26, 1930 Montreal, Quebec, Canada
- Died: March 23, 2023 (aged 92) Victoria, British Columbia, Canada
- Party: Liberal
- Spouse: Naomi Abbott
- Relations: Douglas Charles Abbott (father)
- Children: 3
- Education: Bishop's University; Osgoode Hall Law School

Anthony Chisholm Abbott PC (November 26, 1930 – March 23, 2023) was a Canadian lawyer and politician.

== Early life ==
Born in Montreal, the son of Douglas Charles Abbott, Abbott was a lawyer by profession before being elected to the House of Commons of Canada as the Liberal Member of Parliament for Mississauga, Ontario in the 1974 federal election.

== Political career ==
In 1976, he was appointed to the Cabinet of Prime Minister Pierre Trudeau as Minister of Consumer and Corporate Affairs. In 1977, he became Minister of State for Small Businesses. From 1978 until the defeat of the Trudeau government in the 1979 election, he was Minister of National Revenue.

Abbott lost his seat in the 1979 election. He attempted to return to the House of Commons as a Progressive Conservative candidate in the 1988 federal election running in Eglinton—Lawrence, but was unsuccessful.

== Later career ==
After his defeat, Abbott returned to the private sector serving as president of the Retail Council of Canada. From 1980 until 1988, he was based in London (UK) as the business advisor and legal counsel at the branch office of a major Canadian law firm.

== Death ==
Abbott died on March 23, 2023, at the age of 92.

== Electoral record ==
1988 Canadian federal election: Eglinton—Lawrence
| Party | Candidate | Votes | % | ±% | Expenditures |
|---|---|---|---|---|---|
| Liberal | Joe Volpe | 20,446 | 51.02 | +8.04 | $33,611 |
| Progressive Conservative | Tony Abbott | 12,400 | 30.94 | −9.35 | $26,187 |
| New Democratic | Vittoria Levi | 6,241 | 15.57 | +0.68 | $16,036 |
| Libertarian | Sandor L. Hegedus | 538 | 1.34 | +0.51 | $0 |
| Communist | Geoffrey da Silva | 208 | 0.52 | +0.02 | $357 |
| Revolutionary; Workers League | Margaret Manwaring | 123 | 0.31 | | $776 |
| Commonwealth of Canada | James Felicioni | 122 | 0.30 | | $67 |
| Total valid votes | | 40,078 | 100.00 | | |
| Total rejected ballots | | 565 | | | |
| Turnout | | 40,643 | 74.76 | | |
| Electors on the lists | | 54,362 | | | |

1974 Canadian federal election: Mississauga
| Party | Candidate | Votes | % | ±% |
|---|---|---|---|---|
| Liberal | Tony Abbott | 38,517 | 44.16 | |
| Progressive Conservative | Don Blenkarn | 34,080 | 39.08 | |
| New Democratic | David Busby | 14,276 | 16.37 | |
| Independent | Richard C. Darwin | 227 | 0.26 | |
| Marxist–Leninist | David Starbuck | 113 | 0.13 | |
| Total valid votes | | 87,213 | 100.00 | |
| Total rejected ballots | | 279 | | |
| Turnout | | 87,492 | 73.58 | |
| Electors on the lists | | 118,909 | | |
lop.parl.ca

Political offices
| Preceded by Bryce Stuart Mackasey | Minister of Consumer and Corporate Affairs; 1976–1977 | Succeeded by Warren Allmand |
| | Minister of State (Small Businesses); 1977–1978 | |
| Preceded by Joseph-Philippe Guay | Minister of National Revenue; 1978–1979 | Succeeded by Walter Baker |
