= John Frederick Bligh Livesay =

Canadian journalist

John Frederick Bligh Livesay (January 23, 1875 – June 15, 1944) was an English-born Canadian journalist and author. Livesay held a number of management positions with The Canadian Press.

He was born on the Isle of Wight and came to Canada when he was 20. He worked for the Winnipeg Tribune and later the Winnipeg Telegram. He was the general manager for the Canadian Western Associated Press from its establishment in September 1907 until it merged with The Canadian Press (CP) in September 1917. During World War I. Livesay served as Press Censor for Western Canada. In 1918, he went overseas as war correspondent for CP, returning to Winnipeg in early 1919. Livesay was named assistant general manager for CP's Winnipeg bureau in 1917. In 1920, he moved to Toronto and he served as CP's general manager there until his retirement in 1939.

Livesay married Florence Randal Livesay in 1908. The couple had two daughters, Sophie and the poet Dorothy Livesay.

He wrote two books: Canada's hundred days : with the Canadian corps from Amiens to Mons (1919), describing his experiences as a war correspondent, and The Making of a Canadian (1947).

Livesay died in Clarkson, Ontario in 1944.

In 1974, he was inducted into the Canadian News Hall of Fame.
