= Hyliard Chappell =

Canadian lawyer and politician

Hyliard G Chappell
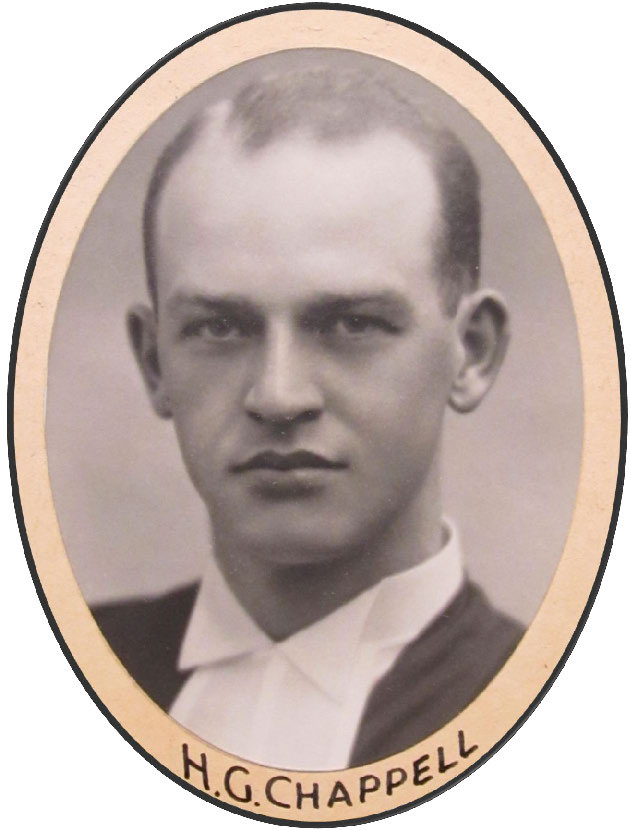

Member of the Canadian Parliament for Peel South
- In office 1968–1972
- Preceded by: The electoral district was created in 1966.
- Succeeded by: Don Blenkarn

Personal details
- Born: April 16, 1916 Barrie, Ontario, Canada
- Died: March 5, 1988 (aged 71)
- Party: Liberal

Hyliard Chappell (April 16, 1916 – March 5, 1988) was a Canadian lawyer and politician.

Born in Barrie, Ontario, he graduated from the Osgoode Hall Law School in 1943. He worked in the law firm of first chairman of Metropolitan Toronto, Fred Gardiner, and started his own firm in 1949 (known today as Chappell, Bushell and Stewart).

He was a councillor from 1947 to 1950 for Toronto Gore Township council and from 1960 to 1962 for the Township of Toronto council. He was elected as the Liberal candidate to the House of Commons of Canada for the riding of Peel South in the 1968 federal election.

He lived on the Riverwood Estate in Mississauga, a 150-acre (0.61 km^{2}) property, which was sold to the City of Mississauga in 1989.
