= Paul Szabo (politician) =

Canadian politician (1948–2024)

Member of Parliament for Mississauga South
- In office 25 October 1993 – 2 May 2011
- Preceded by: Don Blenkarn
- Succeeded by: Stella Ambler

Personal details
- Born: Paul John Mark Szabo; 10 May 1948 Toronto, Ontario, Canada
- Died: 19 December 2024 (aged 76) Mississauga, Ontario, Canada
- Party: Liberal
- Spouse: Linda Szabo
- Profession: Chartered accountant

Paul John Mark Szabo (10 May 1948 – 19 December 2024) was a Canadian politician. He was a member of the House of Commons of Canada who represented the riding of Mississauga South for the Liberal Party from 1993 to 2011.

== Background ==
Szabo was born in Toronto, Ontario on 10 May 1948. He received a Bachelor of Science degree from the University of Western Ontario in 1970. He worked as an accountant for Price Waterhouse in Toronto from 1970 to 1974, and received certification from the Canadian Institute of Chartered Accountants in 1973. He received an M.B.A. from York University in 1975, was a Corporate Controller for Heede International Ltd. in 1975–76, and served the Director of Finance for TransCanada Pipelines Ltd. from 1977 to 1983. He then worked as a Corporate Treasurer for United Cooperative of Ontario from 1984 to 1990, when he opened a private accounting practice in Mississauga. Szabo also served as Vice-Chair and Director of the Mississauga Hospital for nine years, Director of Interim Place shelter for abused women for five years, and was a Director of the Peel Regional Housing Authority for five years.

Szabo died in Mississauga on 19 December 2024, at the age of 76.

== Politics ==
Szabo was involved with the Liberal Party for a long period. He was the party's candidate in Mississauga South for the federal elections of 1980 and 1984, losing to Progressive Conservative Don Blenkarn on both occasions (the first time by 473 votes, the second time by a greater margin). Szabo was first elected in the election of 1993, defeating both Blenkarn and Reformer John Veenstra by a significant margin.

He was re-elected in the 1997 election, easily defeating Reformer Joe Peschisolido (who later became a Liberal MP) and PC candidate Dick Barr. He won another comfortable victory in the 2000 election.

Szabo was known as one of the more socially conservative members of the Liberal caucus. He was anti-abortion, and wrote two works on the perceived breakdown of traditional family values: Divorce - The Bold Facts and Strong Families Make a Strong Country. Szabo also led the opposition within the Liberal caucus with over 50 proposed amendments to a wide-ranging Reproductive Technologies bill cloning, stem cell research, animal-human hybrids etc, and was credited with modifying the final wording of the bill earning the support of the House for five of his key amendments. He was also an opponent of same-sex marriage. In 2004, Szabo was awarded the Joseph P. Borowski Award for his anti-abortion activities.

Szabo also promoted children's issues, and brought forward private member's legislation to provide stiffer criminal sentences for abusers of women and children. He supported greater funding for maternal and parental leave. Here, as well, Szabo's views were strongly influenced by social conservatism. He believed that only a stronger support for the family unit would provide a viable solution to poverty issues.

In addition to the two works mentioned above, Szabo wrote four other monographs: Tragic Tolerance of Domestic Violence, The Child Poverty Solution, Fetal Alcohol Syndrome - The Real Brain Drain and The Ethics and Science of Stem Cells.

Szabo was never appointed to cabinet, but he served as parliamentary secretary to the Minister of Public Works and Government Services from 2000 to 2003. He also served as chair of the Canada-Taiwan Parliamentary Friendship Group for four years.

In 2004, Szabo faced a serious challenge from Charles Sousa for the Liberal nomination in Mississauga South. Sousa was supported by many on the left wing of the Liberal Party, and Szabo was supported by many on its right-wing. Szabo won the challenge, 966 votes to 838. The nomination proved to be Szabo's most difficult challenge in the 2004 campaign. Although the newly founded Conservative Party of Canada targeted his riding, Szabo was able to win re-election with over 50% support.

In the 2006 election, Szabo faced a tough effort from Conservative candidate Phil Green (who also ran for the Conservatives in 2004), but still managed to win by just over 2000 votes. However, the Liberals dropped seats to become the Official Opposition while the Conservatives formed a minority government.

On 14 October 2008, Szabo won re-election over Hugh Arrison.

Szabo was defeated in the 2 May 2011 election when the Conservatives won a majority and the Liberals were reduced to third party status in Parliament.

== Honours ==
Notably, Szabo was determined to have spoken the most words in the 38th Parliament—154,683. He also was ranked first in speaking in Parliament in the 39th Parliament and second in the 40th Parliament. During his 17-year career as a Member of Parliament, he spoke in the House on over 2,000 occasions.

On 21 November 2006, Szabo was honoured as "The Hardest-Working" Member of Parliament at the First Annual Parliamentarian of the Year Awards ceremony held at the National Gallery in Ottawa. Sponsored by Macleans, l'Actualite and the Dominion Institute, the selection was based on an Ipsos-Reid survey of all 306 current Members of Parliament. On 21 November 2007, Szabo was honoured with the same award for a second consecutive year at a ceremony held at the Chateau Frontenac Hotel in Ottawa. On 14 May 2009, he was honoured in a ceremony on Parliament Hill with the same award for the third consecutive year.

In July 2009, in recognition of his career achievements and leadership contributions to the community, he was also elected as a Fellow of the Institute of Chartered Accountants of Ontario. The FCA designation is the highest honour conferred by the Chartered Accounting profession.

On 6 December 2011, he was honoured to receive the Rotary International Paul Harris Fellowship for his long career of service to the community and for his longstanding support for the work of Rotary.

Among his many chairmanship appointments, his position as Chairman of the House of Commons Standing Committee on Access to Information, Privacy and Ethics, commonly known as the "Ethics Committee", reached high-profile public recognition in late 2007 and early 2008 as the committee was convened to review the financial and business dealings between former Prime Minister Brian Mulroney and German-Canadian Karlheinz Schreiber.
