= Florence Randal Livesay =

Canadian writer (1874–1953)

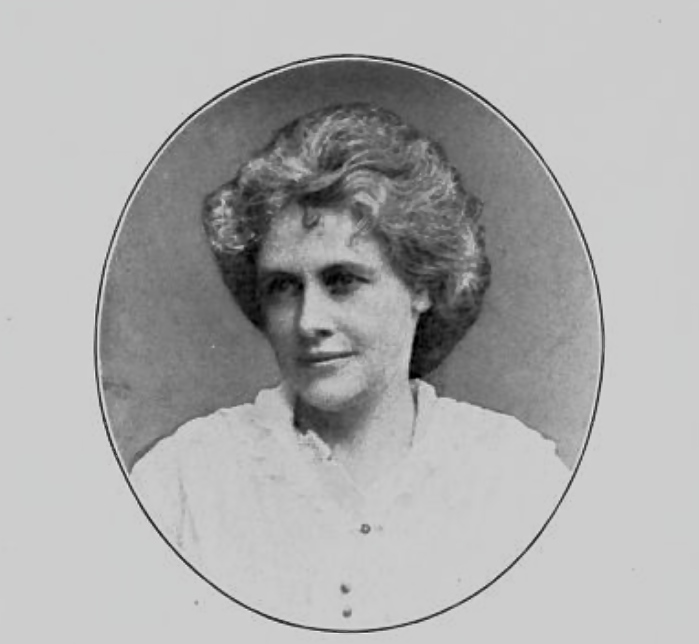
Florence Hamilton Randal

Florence Hamilton Randal Livesay (November 3, 1874 – July 28, 1953) was a Canadian writer.

The daughter of Mary Louisa Andrews and Stephen Randal, she was born Florence Hamilton Randal in Compton, Quebec. She was educated at the Compton Ladies' College. She taught one year at a private school in New York City, then worked seven years as society editor and women's page editor for the Evening Journal in Ottawa. In 1902, she was one of forty Canadian teachers sent to teach in Boer concentration camps in South Africa. She came to Winnipeg in 1903 and worked three years for the Winnipeg Telegram. Livesay then worked for the Manitoba Free Press. She also contributed short stories, poetry and articles to magazines and newspapers in Canada and the United States. Livesay was also known for translating poetry from Ukrainian to English. She was a member of the Canadian Women's Press Club. The family moved to Clarkson, Ontario near Toronto in 1920.

She married John Frederick Bligh Livesay in 1908. The couple had two daughters: the poet Dorothy Livesay and Sophie. Livesay is credited with helping develop Dorothy's career by submitting her early poems to journals and giving editorial advice for her first poetry collections.

She moved to Toronto after her husband died in 1944. Livesay later moved to Grimsby where she died at the age of 78.

== Works ==
- Songs Of Ukrania, With Ruthenian Poems [translated], (1916)
- Shepherd's Purse, (1923)
- Savour Of Salt, (1927)
