= Livesey (disambiguation) =

Livesey is a civil parish in the ceremonial county of Lancashire, England.

Livesey may also refer to:

- Livesey (surname)
- 7170 Livesey (1987 MK), a main-belt asteroid discovered on 30 June 1987
- Livesey Museum for Children, Old Kent Road, Southwark, London, England
- Charlie Livesey (1938–2005), English footballer
- Dorothy Livesay Poetry Prize

== See also ==
- Livesay (disambiguation)
