= Charles Sousa =

Canadian politician

The Honourable Charles Sousa ECO ComM MP
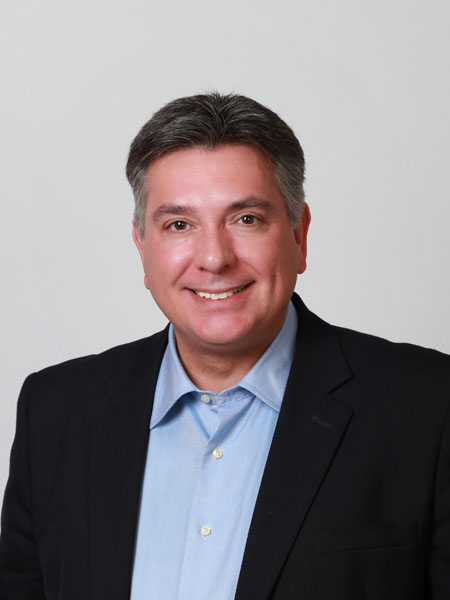
- Sousa in 2010

Member of Parliament for Mississauga—Lakeshore
- Incumbent
- Assumed office December 12, 2022
- Preceded by: Sven Spengemann

Ontario Minister of Finance
- In office February 11, 2013 – June 29, 2018
- Premier: Kathleen Wynne
- Preceded by: Dwight Duncan
- Succeeded by: Vic Fedeli

Ontario Minister of Citizenship and Immigration
- In office October 20, 2011 – November 13, 2012
- Premier: Dalton McGuinty
- Preceded by: Eric Hoskins
- Succeeded by: Michael Chan

Ontario Minister of Labour
- In office December 16, 2010 – October 20, 2011
- Premier: Dalton McGuinty
- Preceded by: Peter Fonseca
- Succeeded by: Linda Jeffrey

Member of the Ontario Provincial Parliament for Mississauga South
- In office October 10, 2007 – June 7, 2018
- Preceded by: Tim Peterson
- Succeeded by: Rudy Cuzzetto

Personal details
- Born: Anthony Charles Sousa; September 27, 1958 (age 68) Toronto, Ontario, Canada
- Party: Liberal
- Other political affiliations: Ontario Liberal
- Spouse: Zenaida Sousa
- Children: 3
- Education: Wilfrid Laurier University (B.B.A.); University of Western Ontario (M.B.A.)
- Occupation: Politician, banker, small business owner

Anthony Charles Sousa MP (born September 27, 1958) is a Canadian politician who has served as the Member of Parliament from Mississauga-Lakeshore since December 12, 2022. He previously served as the Minister of Finance for Ontario from 2013 to 2018. A member of the Ontario Liberal Party, Sousa was elected to represent Mississauga South in the Legislative Assembly of Ontario in 2007. He joined the provincial cabinet as the minister of labour in 2010 and became Ontario's minister of citizenship and immigration in 2011. In 2022, Sousa ran as the federal Liberal candidate in the Mississauga-Lakeshore by-election which was held on December 12, 2022. Sousa won the election, defeating 39 other candidates.

In September 2023, Sousa was appointed as the Parliamentary Secretary to the Minister of Public Services and Procurement.

== Early life, career and education ==
Sousa is the son of Portuguese immigrants. He grew up in Mississauga and graduated from Wilfrid Laurier University in 1982 with a degree in Business Administration. In 1991, he completed a fellowship at the Institute of Canadian Bankers. He then earned an Executive MBA from the Richard Ivey School of Business at the University of Western Ontario in 1994. He worked at Royal Bank of Canada (RBC) Financial Group for more than 20 years, primarily as Director Commercial Banking and Director Marketing at RBC Dominion Securities. Prior to working with RBC, he owned and operated a factoring company that offered asset base financing to small businesses.

Sousa has been a member of the Canadian Chamber of Commerce, a director with the United States Chamber of Commerce and a member of the Toronto Board of Trade. In 2003, he was appointed to represent Canada as a director to the International Chamber of Commerce. He is a past president of the Federation of Portuguese Canadian Business and Professionals Federation of Portuguese-Canadian Business & Professionals and member of the European Union Chamber of Commerce in Toronto (EUCOCIT). He was also an ambassador for the Credit Valley Hospital Foundation and an honorary chair of the Rainbow Ball Foundation.

In 2003, Sousa received a Queen's Golden Jubilee Medal in recognition of his service to the community. In 2009, he was inducted as a Commander (Comendador) to the Order of Merit, and in 2012 he received the Queen's Diamond Jubilee Medal. In 2015, Sousa was also ranked as nobleman to the Confraria Port Wines. He lives in Clarkson with his wife Zenaida and their three children.

== Early involvement in politics ==
Sousa served as one of 29 co-chairs for John Tory's campaign for mayor of Toronto in the 2003 election, being part of the leadership of the group "Grits for Tory". Toronto municipal elections are officially non-partisan, however, Tory was a prominent member of the Progressive Conservative (PC) Party.

Sousa ran against sitting Mississauga South member of Parliament (MP) Paul Szabo for the federal Liberal nomination in 2004, but was defeated in a tightly fought but amicable campaign. This would mark the start of a long-running rivalry between Sousa and Szabo for influence in that riding. In 2014 Sousa backed Sven Spengemann for the federal Liberal nomination against Szabo's preferred candidate, Julie Desjardins with Spengemann winning by only 19 votes as Szabo and Desjardins felt that the nomination was stolen. In the 2018 provincial election, Szabo backed PC party candidate Rudy Cuzzetto.

Sousa ran for the federal Liberal nomination in Mississauga—Erindale in 2006 but was defeated as well.

== Provincial politics ==
=== Entering provincial politics ===
Sousa won the riding of Mississauga South in the 2007 provincial election, defeating incumbent Tim Peterson. Formerly a Liberal, Peterson had crossed the floor in March 2007 to join the Progressive Conservative Party of Ontario (PC Party). Analysts had expected the vote to be extremely close, but Sousa ultimately won the riding with 46.8 per cent of the popular vote, a margin of just over 5,000 votes more than Peterson. He was re-elected in 2011 and 2014.

He was appointed as a parliamentary assistant to three different ministries before Dalton McGuinty promoted him to cabinet in 2010 as Minister of Labour. In October 2011, he was moved to the position of Minister of Citizenship and Immigration. He was also made minister responsible for the PanAm/ParapanAm Games.

In 2008, Sousa introduced a private member's bill to track and report industrial, commercial and institutional (IC&I) waste. He also introduced a private member's resolution to improve financial literacy education amongst youth. He also facilitated passage of the Payday Loans Act to protect Ontario consumers against predatory lending.

In 2011, he introduced and passed Bill 160 – the Occupational Health and Safety Statute Law Amendment Act to create a Chief Prevention Officer and a new prevention council within Ontario's Ministry of Labour. He also introduced and received unanimous support for Bill 181, the Fire Protection and Prevention Amendment Act (2011), addressing protection for Ontario firefighters and duty of fair representation.

In November 2012, he resigned from his cabinet positions in order to contest the 2013 Liberal leadership convention to choose McGuinty's successor. Sousa came in fifth place with 9.8% of the vote on the second ballot after which he withdrew to endorse Kathleen Wynne who went on to win the leadership of the party and the title of Premier of Ontario.

In February 2013, when Wynne officially took over as Premier, she named Sousa as her Minister of Finance. In May 2013, Sousa also assumed the role of Management Board Chair when Harinder Takhar suffered a minor heart attack.

Sousa was defeated in the 2018 provincial election in the renamed riding of Mississauga—Lakeshore by businessman Rudy Cuzzetto.

Following his defeat, he considered running in the 2018 election for Peel Region chair, though he ultimately sat the race out in order to avoid splitting the vote with Bob Delaney, the former Liberal MPP for Mississauga—Streetsville. Following Wynne's 2018 resignation, Sousa was seen as a possible candidate in the subsequent leadership election, though he declined to run.

=== Minister of Finance ===
As Minister of Finance, Sousa developed five deficit budgets and one balanced budget, including: A Prosperous & Fair Ontario (2013); Building Opportunity, Securing Our Future (2014); Building Ontario Up (2015); Jobs for Today and Tomorrow (2016); A Stronger, Healthier Ontario (2017); 2018 Ontario Budget: A Plan for Care and Opportunity; and corresponding Fall Economic Statements. In 2014 and in 2017, Sousa also tabled a Long Term Report on the Ontario Economy. He led Ontario's biggest shakeup to beverage alcohol retailing since Prohibition ended in 1927 by introducing beer and cider to grocery stores, and later wine.

Sousa spearheaded Ontario's leadership on increasing personal contributions and benefits to the Canadian Pension Plan, which ultimately led to a national agreement in principle to enhance the Canada Pension Plan. The Government of Ontario previously intended on introducing a provincial pension plan if the CPP was not expanded. He has also led the establishment of the Cooperative Capital Markets Regulator.

Under Sousa's mandate, the Trillium Trust was put in place to support the largest investment in public infrastructure in Ontario's history: $160 billion over 12 years, supporting 110,000 jobs across the province every year.

In February 2016, Sousa claimed the government intends to balance the $137 billion budget in 2017–2018 following nine consecutive deficits for the province. Most recently, the 2016 Budget announced an improved deficit target of 4.3 billion in 2016–2017, a return to balance in 2017–2018 and continued balance in 2018–2019. Since Sousa became Finance Minister in 2013 the provincial net debt has risen from $252.1 billion to $305.2 billion.

In November 2016, Sousa released the 2017 Fall Economic Statement, which continued to project a balanced budget in 2017–2018, and projects a balance in 2018–2019 and 2019–2020. The statement also marked the eighth consecutive year that the government had beaten its deficit targets. The statement also announced a list of new initiatives, including the launch of previously announced initiatives like OHIP+, increased minimum wage, and supports for seniors. The statement announced new small business tax cuts, as well as cost-lowering initiatives and supports for business who hire young people.

In June 2016, Sousa, through negotiations with the federal Ministry of Finance and other provinces, signed a deal to replace the planned ORPP with an enhanced CPP, The Ontario government, along with other provinces, had been pushing for an enhanced CPP since 2013, quoting studies showing that middle-class Canadians were not saving enough for retirement. The Conservative government of Prime Minister Stephen Harper did not want to discuss the idea. That lack of co-operation from Ottawa prompted Wynne to promise the ORPP, but she emphasized Ontario would abandon that plan if a deal to enhance the CPP could be reached.

In November 2016, Sousa announced plans to create a new regulator in the province to consolidate and strengthen oversight of credit unions, mortgage brokers, provincial pension plans and provincially registered insurers. The creation of the Financial Services Regulatory Authority (FSRA) was a key recommendation of an expert panel on financial regulation convened by the Ontario government.

In April 2017, Sousa released the 2017 Ontario Budget. As his government promised when elected in 2014, the budget was the Ontario's first balanced budget since the 2008 global recession. The budget announced new government initiatives like free prescription medications for everyone 24 and under (dubbed OHIP+), free tuition for 210,000+ post-secondary students, a 25% cut to energy bills via the Fair Hydro Plan, housing affordability measures through the Fair Housing Plan, the Ontario Seniors' Public Transit Tax Credit, and increased investment for healthcare and education. Included in the budget, but announced previously, were initiatives like a plan to study basic income with pilot projects in 3 cities, and a pledge to open 100,000 new child-care spaces with a quarter of those spots set to open in 2017.

On March 28, 2018, Sousa released the 2018 Ontario Budget: A Plan for Care and Opportunity. In the document, the Minister announced a new drug and dental coverage for Ontarians without employer health plans, free preschool child care for children aged two-and-a-half until junior kindergarten, billions in both hospital capital funding, and hundreds of millions in operational funding. Also included in the 2018 budget was new mental health funding, new home-care funding for seniors, and new funding for developmentally disabled adults, among other initiatives.

As Minister of Finance, Sousa had following agencies under his direction: Deposit Insurance Corporation of Ontario, Financial Services Commission of Ontario, Financial Services Tribunal, Liquor Control Board of Ontario, Ontario Electricity Financial Corporation, Ontario Financing Authority, Ontario Lottery and Gaming Corporation and the Ontario Securities Commission.

== Federal politics ==
On November 5, 2022, it was announced that Sousa would run as the federal Liberal candidate in the Mississauga—Lakeshore by-election scheduled for December 12, 2022. The riding had been vacated earlier in the year following the resignation of Liberal MP Sven Spengemann in order to accept a position with the United Nations. Sousa comfortably won the election, defeating Conservative candidate Ron Chhinzer. He was re-elected in the 2025 federal election and was elected chair of the Canadian House of Commons Standing Committee on National Defence in the 45th Canadian Parliament.

== Electoral record ==
=== Federal elections ===
2025 Canadian federal election: Mississauga—Lakeshore
Party	Candidate	Votes	%	±%	Expenditures
Liberal	Charles Sousa	34,971	52.40	+7.39	$138,569.53
Conservative	Tom Ellard	29,416	43.98	+5.40	$119,683.13
New Democratic	Evelyn Butler	1,254	1.88	–7.89	$4,398.25
Green	Mary Kidnew	587	0.89	–1.31	$0.00
People's	Fahad Rao	334	0.50	–3.76	$5,514.10
Independent	Carlton Darby	122	0.18	N/A	$1,607.78
Marxist–Leninist	Anna Di Carlo	113	0.17	N/A	$0.00
Total valid votes/expense limit		66,797	99.53	–	$139,892.77
Total rejected ballots		317	0.47		
Turnout		67,114	70.48		
Eligible voters		95,220			
Liberal notional hold		Swing		+1.00	
Source: Elections Canada
Note: Change in percentage value and swing are calculated from the redistributed results of the 2021 general election, not the 2022 by-election.

Canadian federal by-election, December 12, 2022: Mississauga—Lakeshore Resignation of Sven Spengemann
Party	Candidate	Votes	%	±%	Expenditures
Liberal	Charles Sousa	12,766	51.45	+6.50	
Conservative	Ron Chhinzer	9,215	37.14	-1.54	
New Democratic	Julia Kole	1,231	4.96	-4.79	
Green	Mary Kidnew	792	3.19	+0.94	
People's	Khaled Al-Sudani	293	1.18	-3.03	
Independent	Sean Carson	48	0.19	—	
Independent	Charles Currie	44	0.18	—	
Independent	Patrick Strzalkowski	38	0.15	—	
Independent	Peter House	31	0.12	—	
Independent	Mélodie Anderson	29	0.12	—	
Rhinoceros	Sébastien CoRhino	24	0.10	-0.07	
Independent	Conrad Lukawski	23	0.09	—	
Independent	Adam Smith	23	0.09	—	
Independent	Stephen Davis	21	0.08	—	
Independent	Marie-Hélène LeBel	17	0.07	—	
Independent	Eliana Rosenblum	17	0.07	—	
Independent	Myriam Beaulieu	16	0.06	—	
Independent	Roger Sherwood	14	0.06	—	
Independent	John The Engineer Turmel	14	0.06	—	
Independent	Jevin David Carroll	12	0.05	—	
Independent	Spencer Rocchi	12	0.05	—	
Independent	Tomas Szuchewycz	12	0.05	—	
Independent	Julie St-Amand	11	0.04	—	
Independent	Mark Dejewski	11	0.04	—	
Independent	Julian Selody	10	0.04	—	
Independent	Ben Teichman	10	0.04	—	
Independent	Mylène Bonneau	9	0.04	—	
Independent	Kerri Hildebrandt	9	0.04	—	
Independent	Line Bélanger	8	0.03	—	
Independent	Alexandra Engering	8	0.03	—	
Independent	Samuel Jubinville	8	0.03	—	
Independent	Jean-Denis Parent Boudreault	7	0.03	—	
Independent	Daniel Gagnon	7	0.03	—	
Independent	Darcy Justin Vanderwater	6	0.02	—	
Independent	Donovan Eckstrom	5	0.02	—	
Independent	Donald Gagnon	5	0.02	—	
Independent	Martin Acetaria Caesar Jubinville	3	0.01	—	
Independent	Ysack Dupont	2	0.01	—	
Independent	Pascal St-Amand	2	0.01	—	
Independent	Alain Lamontagne	1	0.00	—	
Total valid votes		24,814			
Total rejected ballots		135	0.54		
Turnout		24,949	27.76		
Eligible voters		89,863			
Liberal hold		Swing		+4.02	
Source: Elections Canada

=== Provincial elections ===
2018 Ontario general election: Mississauga—Lakeshore
Party	Candidate	Votes	%	±%
Progressive Conservative	Rudy Cuzzetto	22,520	42.33	+8.88
Liberal	Charles Sousa	18,636	35.03	-15.45
New Democratic	Boris Rosolak	9,735	18.30	+7.62
Green	Lloyd Jones	1,572	2.95	-0.24
None of the Above	Kenny Robinson	363	0.68	
Libertarian	Jay Ward	223	0.42	
Go Vegan	Felicia Trigiani	150	0.28	
Total valid votes		53,199	99.12	
Total rejected, unmarked and declined ballots		474	0.88	
Turnout		53,673	59.33	
Eligible voters		90,469		
Progressive Conservative notional gain from Liberal		Swing		+12.17
Source: Elections Ontario

2014 Ontario general election
Party	Candidate	Votes	%	±%
Liberal	Charles Sousa	22,192	50.76%	+0.05%
Progressive Conservative	Effie Triantafilopoulos	14,514	33.2%	-2.89%
New Democratic	Boris Rosolak	4,649	10.63%	+0.57%
Green	Lloyd Jones	1,418	3.24%	+1.1%
None of the Above	Andrew Weber	591	1.35%	-
LTN	James Judson	355	0.81%	-

2011 Ontario general election
Party	Candidate	Votes	%	±%
Liberal	Charles Sousa	20,375	50.7%	+3.9%
Progressive Conservative	Geoff Janoscik	14,499	36.1%	+1.7%
New Democratic	Anju Sikka	4,044	10.1%	+1%
Green	Cory Mogk	860	2.1%	-6.7%
Freedom	Mark Harris	236	0.59	
Vegan Environmental	Paul Figueiras	165	0.41	
Total valid votes		40,179	100.00	
Total rejected, unmarked and declined ballots		178	0.44	
Turnout		40,357	51.25	
Eligible voters		78,746		
Liberal hold		Swing		+1.12
Source: Elections Ontario

2007 Ontario general election
Party	Candidate	Votes	%	±%
Liberal	Charles Sousa	19,195	46.8%	+3.0%
Progressive Conservative	Tim Peterson	14,114	34.4%	-8.8%
New Democratic	Ken Cole	3,745	9.1%	-0.7%
Green	David Johnston	3,627	8.8%	+6.4%
Family Coalition	Samantha Toteda	345	0.8%	-0.6%

Wynne ministry, Province of Ontario (2013–2018)
Cabinet posts (2)
Predecessor	Office	Successor
Harinder Takhar	Management Board Chair; 2013–2014	Deb Matthews
Dwight Duncan	Minister of Finance; 2013–2018	Vic Fedeli
McGuinty ministry, Province of Ontario (2003–2013)
Cabinet posts (2)
Predecessor	Office	Successor
Eric Hoskins	Minister of Citizenship and Immigration; 2011–2012; Also Responsible for the 2015 Pan and Parapan American Games	Michael Chan
Peter Fonseca	Minister of Labour; 2010–2011	Linda Jeffrey
