= Don Blenkarn =

Canadian politician

Member of the Canadian Parliament for Peel South
- In office 1972–1974
- Preceded by: Hyliard Chappell
- Succeeded by: Anthony Abbott

Member of the Canadian Parliament for Mississauga South
- In office 1979–1993
- Preceded by: District was created in 1976
- Succeeded by: Paul Szabo

Personal details
- Born: Donald Alex Blenkarn; June 17, 1930 Toronto, Ontario, Canada
- Died: January 30, 2012 (aged 81) New Smyrna Beach, Florida, US
- Party: Progressive Conservative
- Children: 3
- Education: University of British Columbia
- Occupation: Lawyer, farmer

Donald Alex Blenkarn (June 17, 1930 – January 30, 2012) was a Progressive Conservative Party of Canada Member of Parliament.

Blenkarn was born in Toronto. A lawyer and businessman by profession, he was elected in 1972 to represent the riding of Peel South. He held on the riding until the 1974 election when he was defeated by Liberal Anthony Abbott. He was re-elected to the House of Commons as the Member of Parliament for Mississauga South in 1979 and served as the Chairman of the House of Commons Finance Committee during the Mulroney years. He was defeated by Liberal Paul Szabo in the 1993 election.

Blenkarn owned a tree farm later in life in Hockley Valley.
