= Peel South =

Former federal electoral district in Ontario, Canada

Ontario electoral district

Defunct federal electoral district
- Legislature: House of Commons
- District created: 1966
- District abolished: 1976
- First contested: 1968
- Last contested: 1974

Peel South (also known as Mississauga riding) was a federal electoral district represented in the House of Commons of Canada from 1968 to 1974. It was located in the province of Ontario. The riding was created in 1966 from parts of the Peel riding.

It consisted of the Township of Toronto in the County of Peel, and the part of Metropolitan Toronto lying west of the Etobicoke River.

The electoral district's name was changed in late 1973 to Mississauga, on a request by then MP Don Blenkarn, to coincide with the creation of the City of Mississauga. It was abolished in 1976 when it was redistributed between Brampton—Halton Hills, Mississauga North and Mississauga South ridings.

== Members of Parliament ==
Parliament	Years	Member	Party
Peel South; Riding created from Peel
28th	1968–1972	Hyliard Chappell	Liberal
29th	1972–1974	Don Blenkarn	Progressive Conservative
Mississauga
30th	1974–1979	Anthony Abbott	Liberal
Riding dissolved into Brampton—Halton Hills, Mississauga North and Mississauga South

== Election results ==
1968 Canadian federal election: Peel South
Party	Candidate	Votes
Liberal	Hyliard Chappell	24,255
Progressive Conservative	Earl K. Brownridge	19,065
New Democratic	Keith Wollard	8,498

1972 Canadian federal election: Peel South
Party	Candidate	Votes
Progressive Conservative	Don Blenkarn	31,981
Liberal	Bill Kent	30,305
New Democratic	David Busby	18,553
Independent	Michael Houlton	461

1974 Canadian federal election: Mississauga
Party	Candidate	Votes
Liberal	Anthony Abbott	38,517
Progressive Conservative	Don Blenkarn	34,080
New Democratic	David Busby	14,276
Independent	Richard C. Darwin	227
Marxist–Leninist	David A. Starbuck	113

== See also ==
- List of Canadian electoral districts
- Historical federal electoral districts of Canada
