= Dorothy Livesay =

Canadian poet (1909–1996)

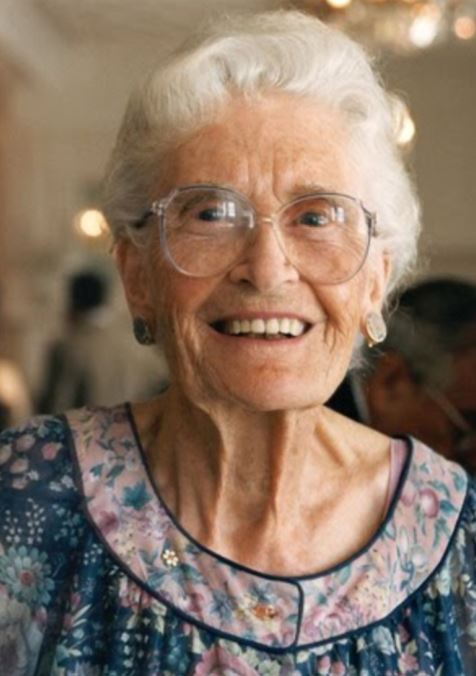
- Born: Dorothy Kathleen May Livesay; October 12, 1909; Winnipeg, Manitoba
- Died: December 29, 1996 (aged 87); Victoria, British Columbia
- Education: Trinity College, Toronto
- Spouse: Duncan Macnair
- Children: Peter, Marcia
- Writing career
- Language: English
- Genre: Poetry
- Notable work: Collected Poems: The Two Seasons
- Notable awards: Order of Canada; Order of British Columbia; Governor General's Award, Lorne Pierce Medal, FRSC

Dorothy Kathleen May Livesay, OC OBC FRSC (October 12, 1909 – December 29, 1996) was a Canadian poet who twice won the Governor General's Award in the 1940s, and was "senior woman writer in Canada" during the 1970s and 1980s.

== Life ==
Livesay was born in Winnipeg, Manitoba. Her mother, Florence Randal Livesay, was a poet and journalist; her father, J.F.B. Livesay was the General Manager of Canadian Press. Livesay moved to Toronto, Ontario, with her family in 1920. She graduated with a BA in 1931 from Trinity College in the University of Toronto and received a diploma from the University of Toronto's Faculty of Social Work in 1934. She also studied at the University of British Columbia and the Sorbonne.

In 1931, in Paris, Livesay became a committed Communist. She joined the Communist Party of Canada in 1933, and was active in a number of its front organizations: the Canadian Labour Defence League, the Canadian League Against War and Fascism, Friends of the Soviet Union, and the Workers' Unity League. Livesay moved to Vancouver in 1935, and married Duncan Macnair, a fellow socialist, in 1937. They had two children, Peter and Marcia.

In the early 1940s, Livesay suggested to Anne Marriott, Floris McLaren, and Doris Ferne that they start a poetry magazine which would serve as a vehicle for poets outside the somewhat closed Montreal circle. Alan Crawley agreed to edit the magazine, and the first issue of Contemporary Verse appeared in September 1941, After Macnair died in 1959, Livesay worked for UNESCO in Paris, and then in Northern Rhodesia (now Zambia) as a field worker from 1960 to 1963.

Between 1951 and 1984, she was an instructor and a writer-in-residence at many Canadian universities, including the University of British Columbia (1951–1953 and 1966–1968), University of New Brunswick (1966–1968), University of Alberta (1968–1971), University of Victoria (1972–1974), University of Manitoba (1974–1976), Simon Fraser University (1980–1982), and University of Toronto (1983–1984). In 1975, Livesay founded the journal Contemporary Verse 2 (CVII). She died in Victoria, British Columbia in 1996.

== Writing ==
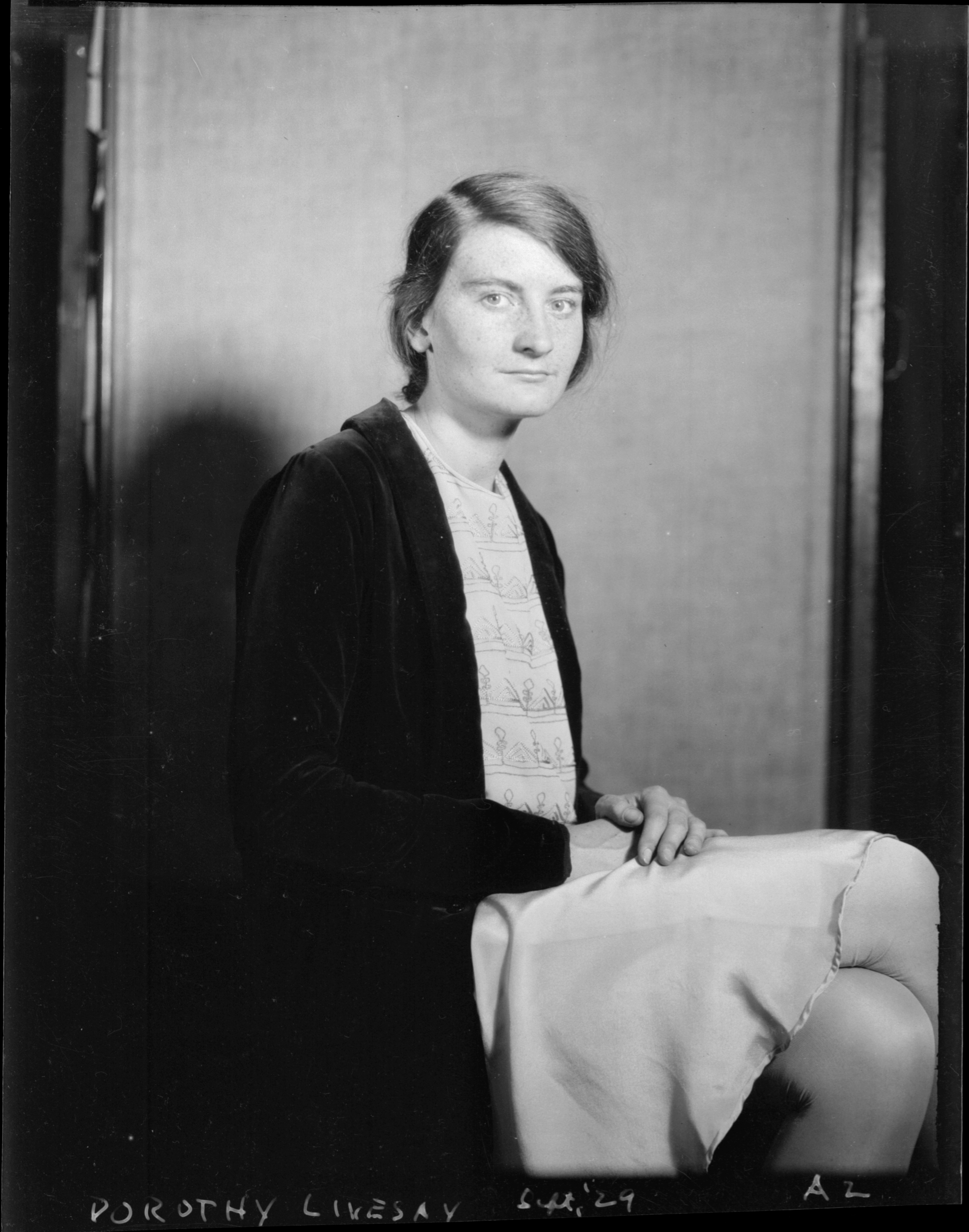
Dorothy Livesay, 1929

Livesay's first collection of poetry, Green Pitcher, was published in 1928, when she was only nineteen. The Encyclopedia of Literature says, "these were well-crafted poems that not only showed skilled use of the imagist technique but prefigured Margaret Atwood's condemnations of exploitative and fearful attitudes to the Canadian landscape." The book "later disappointed Livesay by its failure to deal openly with social issues.

She published her first short story, "Heat", in the Canadian Mercury at the same age (in January, 1929). Her second book of poems, Signpost (1932), "showed the increasing sophistication of her imagist skills, as in 'Green rain', and an original sense of feminine sexuality."

When her Selected Poems were published in 1956, Canadian literary critic Northrop Frye said of them:

Miss Livesay is an imagist who started off, in Green Pitcher (1929), in the Amy Lowell idiom.... With Day and Night (1944) a social passion begins to fuse the diction, tighten the rhythm, and concentrate the imagery.... From "Prelude for Spring" on, the original imagist texture gradually returns.... The basis of Miss Livesay's imagery is the association between winter and the human death-impulse and between spring and the human capacity for life. Cutting across this is the irony of the fact that spring tends to obliterate the memory of winter, whereas human beings enjoying love and peace retain an uneasy sense of the horrors of hatred and war....

The dangers of imagism are facility and slackness, and one reads through this book with mixed feelings. But it is one of the few rewards of writing poetry that the poet takes his ranking from his best work. Miss Livesay's most distinctive quality, I think, is her power of observing how other people observe, especially children. Too often her own observation goes out of focus, making the love poems elusive and the descriptive ones prolix, but in the gentle humour of 'The Traveller,' in 'The Child Looks Out,' in 'On Seeing,' in the nursery-rhyme rhythm of 'Abracadabra,' and in many other places, we can see what Professor Desmond Pacey means by "a voice we delight to hear."

== Awards and honours ==
Livesay won the Governor General's Award, Canada's top poetry honour, twice: in 1944 for Day and Night, and in 1947 for Poems for People. The Royal Society of Canada elected her as a Fellow, and awarded her its Lorne Pierce Medal, in 1947. Livesay also won the Queen's Canada Medal in 1977, and the Persons Case Award for the Status of Women in 1984.

In 1983, she was made a Doctor of Athabasca University and in 1987, she became an Officer of the Order of Canada. Livesay was awarded the Order of British Columbia in 1992. The Dorothy Livesay Poetry Prize is a category of the BC Book Prizes that is awarded to authors of the best work of poetry in a given year, where those authors are British Columbia or Yukon residents, or have been for three of the last five years. Originally known as the B.C. Prize for Poetry, in 1989 it was named after Livesay.

== Publications ==
=== Poetry ===
- Green Pitcher. Toronto: Macmillan, 1928.
- Signpost. Toronto: Macmillan, 1932.
- Day and Night. Toronto: Ryerson, 1944 New Edition by Oolichan Books, 2011.
- Poems for People. Toronto: Ryerson, 1947.
- Call My People Home. Toronto: Ryerson, 1950.
- New Poems. Toronto: Emblem Books, 1955.
- Selected Poems, 1926-1956. Toronto: Ryerson Press, 1957.
- The Colour of God's Face. 1964.
- The Unquiet Bed. Toronto: Ryerson Press, 1967.
- The Documentaries. Toronto: Ryerson Press, 1968.
- Plainsongs. Fredericton, NB: Fiddlehead Poetry Books, 1971.
- Plainsongs Extended. Fredericton, NB: Fiddlehead Poetry Books, 1971
- Disasters of the Sun. Burnaby, BC: Blackfish Press, 1971.
- Collected Poems: The Two Seasons. Toronto: Mcgraw-Hill Ryerson, 1972.
- Nine Poems of Farewell. Windsor, ON: Black Moss Press, 1973.
- Ice Age. Erin, ON: Porcepic, 1975.
- Right Hand Left Hand. Erin, ON: Porcepic, 1977.
- The Raw Edges: Voices from Our Time. Winnipeg: Turnstone Press, 1981.
- The Phases of Love. Toronto: Coach House, 1983.
- Feeling the Worlds: New Poems. Fredericton: Goose Lane, 1984.
- Beyond War: The Poetry. 1985
- The Self-Completing Tree: Selected Poems. Victoria: Porcepic, 1986.
- Beginnings. Winnipeg: Peguis, 1988.
- The Woman I Am. Montreal: Guernica, 1991.
- Archive for Our Times: Previously Uncollected and Unpublished Poems of Dorothy Livesay, Irvine Dean ed. Vancouver: Arsenal Pulp Press, 1998.

=== Memoirs ===
- A Winnipeg Childhood (1973)
- Right hand left hand: a true life of the thirties (1977)
- Journey With My Selves: A Memoir, 1909-1963 (1991)

Except where otherwise noted, bibliographic information courtesy Brock University.

== Discography ==
- Celebration: Famous Canadian Poets CD Canadian Poetry Association — 2001 ISBN 1-55253-031-0 (CD#2) (with Eli Mandel)

== See also ==
- Canadian literature
- Canadian poetry
- List of Canadian poets
