= Sven Spengemann =

German-Canadian lawyer, bureaucrat and politician

Chair of the Standing Committee on Foreign Affairs and International Development
- In office December 13, 2021 – May 27, 2022
- Preceded by: Himself
- Succeeded by: Ali Ehsassi
- In office October 13, 2020 – August 15, 2021
- Preceded by: Michael Levitt
- Succeeded by: Vacant

Member of Parliament for Mississauga—Lakeshore
- In office October 19, 2015 – May 27, 2022
- Preceded by: Stella Ambler
- Succeeded by: Charles Sousa

Personal details
- Born: October 3, 1966 (age 60) Berlin, Germany
- Party: Liberal
- Spouse: Kirsty Duncan (died 2026)
- Education: University of Toronto (BSc); York University (LLB); College of Europe (LLM); Harvard University (LLM, SJD)
- Profession: Attorney
- Awards: Fulbright Fellowship

Sven Michael Spengemann (born October 3, 1966) is a German-Canadian lawyer, bureaucrat and politician, who represented the electoral district of Mississauga—Lakeshore in the House of Commons of Canada as a member of the Liberal Party from 2015 to 2022. In 2022, he resigned as the member of Parliament for Mississauga—Lakeshore to accept a role with the United Nations.

== Early life ==
Spengemann immigrated to Canada at age 14 with his family, and settled in the Credit Woodlands neighbourhood of Mississauga. He completed his secondary education at The Woodlands School.

== Education ==
Spengemann earned a BSc in psychology from the Mississauga campus of the University of Toronto in 1990.

Spengemann obtained an LL.B from Osgoode Hall Law School of York University in 1998 and an LL.M focused on European Union Law from the College of Europe in Bruges, Belgium, in 1999. He earned a second LLM (international law) and a doctorate of juridical science at Harvard Law School in the field of political and constitutional theory, under the direction of Anne-Marie Slaughter, in 2006. In the course of his studies, Spengemann earned a number of awards and distinctions, including a Canada-US Fulbright Scholarship (2001).

== Career ==
From 1991 to 1995, Spengemen worked with Toronto-Dominion Bank, supervising their Green Line Investor Services. During this time, he oversaw a team of client service employees and compliance management.

From 2003 to 2005, Spengemann served as a Senior Policy Analyst at the Government of Canada’s Privy Council Office, examining national security law and international regulatory issues in the Canada-U.S. bilateral relationship.

From 2005 to 2012, Spengemann served as a legal adviser and senior constitutional officer with the United Nations Assistance Mission for Iraq. During his service, he negotiated legal protocols with U.S. and Coalition military forces to ensure security, medical and operational support for the UN's activities in the country. Additionally, he led a team of international and Iraqi experts to assist the new Parliament of Iraq and Kurdistan Regional Government with constitutional and legislative reforms, including oil & gas management, human rights, institutional design and federalism.

His work in Iraq earned him an Osgoode Hall Gold Key alumni award and recognition as a democracy expert in the University of Toronto’s 'Boundless' Campaign. In 2011, he spent a four-month sabbatical leave as a visiting scholar at the university's Munk School of Global Affairs and Public Policy, with a joint appointment to the Balsillie School of International Affairs at the University of Waterloo.

Following his U.N. service in 2012, he became a visiting professor and BMO Visiting Fellow at York University, teaching graduate courses at its Glendon School of Public and International Affairs. He resigned from this role in 2014 to enter electoral politics.

== Politics ==
In 2012, Spengemann became a member of the Liberal Party Riding Association of Mississauga—Lakeshore and took on the portfolio of Vice President for Communications and Outreach. In early 2014, Spengemann declared his intention to seek the federal Liberal nomination for the riding and won the nomination in September of that year.

In the 2015 federal election, Spengemann defeated Conservative incumbent Stella Ambler to win the new Mississauga—Lakeshore electoral district. He was re-elected in both the 2019 and 2021 elections.

On May 18, 2022, Spengemann announced that he would resign as member of Parliament for Mississauga—Lakeshore to accept a position with the United Nations.

== Personal life ==
Spengemann is fluent in English and French, as well as German. He was in a relationship with (and eventually married) Liberal MP Kirsty Duncan, who died in 2026.

== Electoral record ==
2021 Canadian federal election: Mississauga—Lakeshore
Party	Candidate	Votes	%	±%	Expenditures
Liberal	Sven Spengemann	25,284	44.94	-3.46	$100,636.46
Conservative	Michael Ras	21,761	38.68	+1.40	$95,632.95
New Democratic	Sarah Walji	5,488	9.75	+1.39	$6.00
People's	Vahid Seyfaie	2,367	4.21	+3.03	$646.34
Green	Elizabeth Robertson	1,265	2.25	-2.36	$1,660.10
Rhinoceros	Kayleigh Tahk	94	0.17	-	$8.07
Total valid votes/expense limit		56,259	99.08	–	$117,701.69
Total rejected ballots		524	0.92	+0.26	
Turnout		56,783	63.79	-4.12	
Eligible voters		89,017			
Liberal hold		Swing		-2.43	
Source: Elections Canada

2019 Canadian federal election: Mississauga—Lakeshore
Party	Candidate	Votes	%	±%	Expenditures
Liberal	Sven Spengemann	29,526	48.40	+0.69	$104,588.59
Conservative	Stella Ambler	22,740	37.28	-3.95	$110,262.85
New Democratic	Adam Laughton	5,103	8.37	+0.38	none listed
Green	Cynthia Trentelman	2,814	4.61	+2.26	$2,524.73
People's	Eugen Vizitiu	717	1.18	-	none listed
United	Carlton Darby	99	0.16	-	$0.00
Total valid votes		60,999	99.34		
Total rejected ballots		407	0.66	+0.21	
Turnout		61,406	67.91	-0.79	
Eligible voters		90,419			
Liberal hold		Swing		+2.32	
Source: Elections Canada

2015 Canadian federal election
Party	Candidate	Votes	%	±%	Expenditures
Liberal	Sven Spengemann	28,279	47.71	+10.86	$74,169.40
Conservative	Stella Ambler	24,435	41.22	-5.68	$221,638.11
New Democratic	Eric Guerbilsky	4,735	7.99	-4.80	$6,908.86
Green	Ariana Burgener	1,397	2.36	-0.72	$1,924.23
Libertarian	Paul Wodworth	316	0.53	-	$1,166.63
Marxist–Leninist	Dagmar Sullivan	111	0.19	-	
Total valid votes/expense limit		59,273	100.00	–	$224,818.71
Total rejected ballots		271	0.46		
Turnout		59,544	68.99		
Eligible voters		86,308	–	–	
Liberal gain from Conservative		Swing		+8.27	
