= Lorne Park =

- Neighbourhood
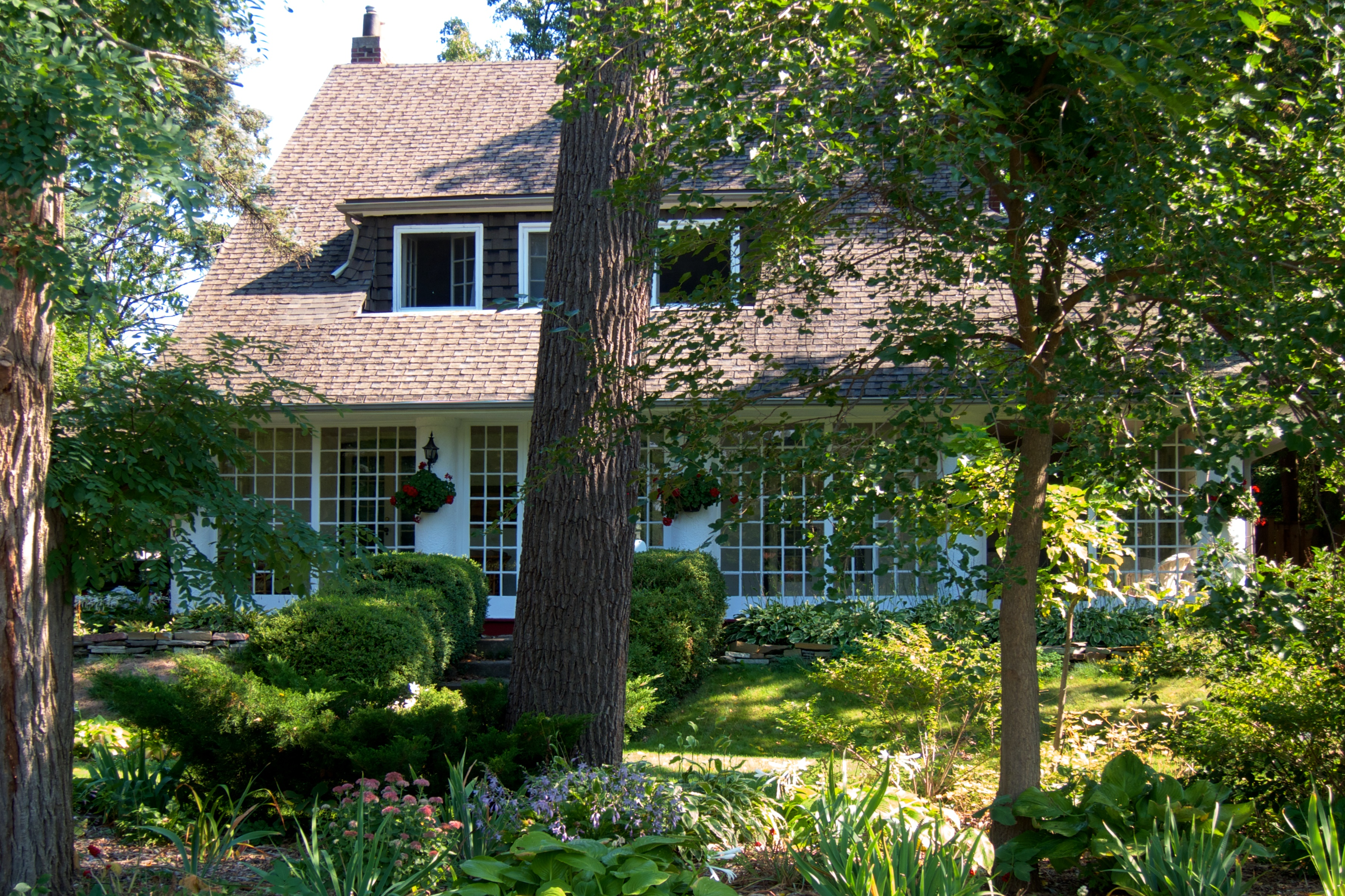
- The Canavan House is one of the older houses in the Lorne Park community, and a historic site.
- Interactive map of Lorne Park
- Coordinates: 43°32′7″N 79°37′7″W
- Country: Canada
- Province: Ontario
- Regional municipality: Peel
- City: Mississauga
- Established: c. 1800

Government
  - MP: Charles Sousa (Mississauga—Lakeshore)
  - MPP: Rudy Cuzzetto (Mississauga—Lakeshore)
  - Councillors: Alvin Tedjo (Ward 2)
- Postal code: L5H

Lorne Park is a suburban residential neighbourhood located in southwestern Mississauga, Ontario, Canada, that was first established as a resort.

== History ==
Lorne Park shares a common history with the adjacent Clarkson. Before the arrival of the Europeans, all the land that today comprises Lorne Park (and all of the City of Mississauga) belonged to the Mississaugas.

One of the first European settlers in the Clarkson-Lorne Park area was Warren Clarkson. Lorne Park is located in what was originally Toronto Township, which comprised a number of hamlets and incorporated towns and villages.

Lakeshore Road originated as a log road built from the mouth of the Credit River to the Humber River 1820, and was extended west shortly after through the Lorne Park area to connect York (now Toronto) to Hamilton. By 1830, logging was a major industry in Lorne Park. Most of the pine wood was exported to Britain and the United States.

Over the early part of the 20th century Lorne Park grew into a unique community. In 1887, Joseph Thompson bought 86 acres (35 ha) of land in Lorne Park which became known as Thompson's Wood, now called Jack Darling Park. Thompson's brother Ernest Seton lived there until the home was lost in foreclosure. Ernest left, changed his name to Ernest Thompson Seton and achieved fame as an author and artist. The Lorne Park Post Office opened in 1892 and George D. Perry was the village's first postmaster. James Alberton built the three-story Albertonia Hotel in 1899. In 1927, it was renamed the Lorne Park Lodge but burned down two years later in 1929.

The Lorne Park Mission Hall was built in 1902. It featured an open porch and a bell tower on the roof. The first library was organized by sawmill owner Robert Taylor in 1903. The first library meeting was held in January, 1904, in the Lorne Park Mission Hall. Reverend H. Thompson officiated over the first Anglican services in 1906, also held at the Lorne Park Mission Hall. St. Paul's Anglican Church was built in 1914. The Lorne Park Baptist Church was founded Sunday, May 18, 1919, in the Lorne Park Mission, with Reverend J. Williamson presiding.

At some point a 30 ha (74 acres) "pleasure grounds," was operated in Lorne Park by the Toronto Park Association, included separate parlours for men and women, bowling lanes and merry-go-rounds. Travel to the resort from Toronto was often by steamer. After a series of bankruptcies, the resort lands were sold to cottagers. With the completion of the Queen Elizabeth Way, suburbanization of the surrounding lands ensued in the post-World War II period, with the cottage areas becoming residential. The former cottage areas largely retain a woodsy character today and stand out from the later suburban developments, with streets having no curbs or sidewalks.

For the next half century, Lorne Park remained a small community, until 1968 when it, along with the rest of Toronto Township, was restructured into the Town of Mississauga, which became the City of Mississauga in 1974.

== Lorne Park Estates ==
Lorne Park Estates is a 31 ha (77 acres) community, south of Lorne Park, located within the City of Mississauga. It is bordered by Lake Ontario on the south, Lakeshore Road on the north, Jack Darling Park on the west and Richard's Memorial Park on the East.

LPEA Homeowners are responsible for municipal taxes and upkeep of the LPEA lands, and are also co-operatively responsible for the maintenance, insurance and taxes on their 15 ha (37 acres) reserve; including their roads, forests, walking trails, a cottage, a private park and amenities area (the 'Commons') and their 0.8 km (0.5 mi) of private beaches with riparian rights.

There are only 2 roads into Lorne Park Estates and they are clearly marked as "private" as they are dually privately maintained and privately owned by the Lorne Park Estates Association. These private roads are for the exclusive use of only the residents within the estates, and their invited guests. These privately maintained roads in the community are narrow, uncurbed and with no sidewalks as this is the common preference of their exclusive community.

== Lorne Park Estates history ==
The Lorne Park is commonly thought to be named after John Campbell, 9th Duke of Argyll, better known by the courtesy title Marquess of Lorne. However, this is conjecture, as the park was already titled Lorne before he became Governor General, and the aetiology of the name Lorne is unclear. The Marquis also was not in attendance at the opening of the park in 1879: The Marquis was in Montreal officiating an investiture ceremony knighting members into the Queen's privy counsel commissioning the official opening of the Beaux Arts Museum that Victoria Day weekend in 1879. Historically the community, and the parklands have seen many changes. The land, first occupied by the Mississaugas, was transferred with larger land portion through Treaty No. 13 to Governor John Graves Simcoe in 1805.

The land, which housed a significant stand of pines, was slated to be used for its wood as resources for the British Empire. However, this was not required and the land remained intact and became a subject of interest. First by individuals of the British military who wished to settle, and then by sundry businessmen and investors. Its legal ownership started 1832, ultimately resulting in the owners taking charge of their community. Currently, Lorne Park Estate owners have Canada Postal Service, garbage and water service alliance with the City of Mississauga, homes were electrically heated still into the 1980s, when a gas line deal was brokered with Union Gas. Roads, parks and sewage are handled by the Lorne Park Estates Association and the individual homeowners within the estates.

In a survey of 1888 the "Toronto and Lorne Park Summer Resort Company" assumed cottage lots, a hotel, wharf, walking trails and common grounds from the formerly named Toronto Park Association. The hotel in the amusement park at that time was called the Lorne Park Hotel. The newly revamped community was orchestrated and drawn by Edmund Burke, (a park resident) of Langley and Burke architects, including many of the original cottages and a Burke designed renovation to the existing Hotel. The investors renamed the Hotel Lorne as "the Hotel Louise" at that point, it is commonly thought this was to capitalize on the popularity of the Marquis of Lorne and the dual coincidence of the existing park name "Lorne" which dates back to 1860, but Louise was the name of the premier investor James Boustead's mother, also his daughter Mary Louise Boustead Clarke.

The park was officially re-opened in May 1889 (the Marquis of Lorne had been departed from Canada in 1883 at this point and he was no longer governor General). Trains, carriage and steamers left Toronto on a regular basis to ferry visitors to the wharf, picnic areas, dining pavilion and eating establishment. Most of the names of the original investors are reflected in the street names Roper, Stockwell, and Henderson, however, the streets proposed at that time did not all survive as entertained, the Toronto and Lorne Park summer Resort Company did not thrive past 1903, when the wharf collapsed and 3 bystanders were splashed by Lake Ontarios frigid waters. Without a wharf for steamers to ferry people to Lorne Park, the enterprise floundered, and it became an exclusively owned private summer retreat for the wealthy temperate Toronto elite who owned it.

The end of the wharf was a mixed blessing for the community as its temperate residents became increasingly annoyed by members of the greater community, who routinely only wished to use the wharf for transportation into the city of York (Toronto), rather than patronise the dry Lorne Park amenities as their choice of recreational destination. The hotel and common lands were purchased by investors keen to re-invent the park as a motor club: and the hotel was renamed the Lakeshore Country club, which failed, because an attempt to procure a liquor license was thwarted by the resident homeowner shareholders within the park, and the LCC was foreclosed upon by the Farmers Bank in 1911.

In 1914, Toronto investor developer Sydney Small purchased the common lands and hotel for the amount of $46,000 with plans to develop the forest into a subdivision. Development was thwarted by the residents with a Supreme Court of Canada ruling. This coincided with the WW1 real estate market downturn and actually was a fortuitous turn of events for Mr Small who was saved further losses by his non-development as houses did not start selling again until after World War II. In 1919, resident Mary Louise Boustead Clarke purchased the lands and Hotel for $20,000 to prevent further outsiders from developing the parklands and ultimately her estate bequeathed the lands to the Lorne Park Estates Association in 1948. The hotel was irreparably damaged by fire in 1920.

The survey of 1922, shows slight changes to the lot configuration under the auspices of Lorne Park Estates Limited. Few of the lots were bought with the intention of building small cottages. According to "A Village Within a City - a Story of Lorne Park Estates" (1980), some people were purchasing two to four lots in order to create larger properties of up to 0.4 ha (0.99 acres). However, the forests, walking paths, Commons area and beach area continued to be collectively owned and managed. Orient Avenue and North Crescent became referred to by locals as Orient Marsh as they are still undeveloped. Lugsdin Avenue became referred to as Lugsdin Creek. Campbell, McIntyre, Neville, Venn, Hill Dale and Moore avenues have to date not been developed, but Boustead Terrace, the grand lakefront promenade feature of the Victorian era park, has disappeared through the erosive effects of the lake and parkland mismanagement. Sections of Boustead Terrace still remain today but it is currently impassable as a road.

Of the summer homes that were initially built, a number were designed by Edmund Burke in the English Arts and Crafts style as two-storeys with deep verandas and sleeping balconies to catch the breeze of Lake Ontario.

== Transportation ==
The main roads in Lorne Park are Lakeshore Road, Lorne Park Road, Truscott Drive, and Indian Road. The main bus routes are 23 Lakeshore and 14 Lorne Park, operated by Mississauga Transit. From the 1967 to 1968 the Lakeshore West line stopped at Lorne Park station. After service stopped the station shelters and platforms gradually disappeared. The stop once was used by Canadian National Railway for their Toronto to Niagara Falls passenger service and featured a 1880s built station.

== Education ==
The two-storey, four-room Lorne Park Public School opened in 1923, with 76 students enrolled. Throughout the 1930s the school was a centre of community activity, hosting concerts, Christmas festivities, dinners and village events. The original school was destroyed by fire on January 22, 1982 and was rebuilt. It serves students grades 1 through 5.

The Lorne Park Secondary School was founded in 1958 and serves approximately 900 students in grades 9 through 12.

== In popular culture ==
Lorne Park has been a popular location to shoot films. Downsizing (2017) starring Matt Damon was filmed on Cloverbrea Crescent.

The house located at 1287 Birchview Drive was featured in Sneakerella (2022) starring Chosen Jacobs, You Are So Not Invited to My Bat Mitzvah (2023) with Adam Sandler, shows Locke & Key, Culprits, and the second season of FUBAR with Arnold Schwarzenegger.

== Notable residents ==
- Tommy Hunter - country musician
- Patrick Brown – Mayor of Brampton and former leader of the Ontario Progressive Conservative Party
- Brent Urban – defense for the Baltimore Ravens in the NFL
- Dylan Strome – centre for the Washington Capitals in the NHL
- Ryan Strome – centre for the Anaheim Ducks in the NHL

== See also ==
- Lorne Park Secondary School
- Holy Name of Mary College School
