= Clarkson, Mississauga =

Clarkson
- Neighbourhood
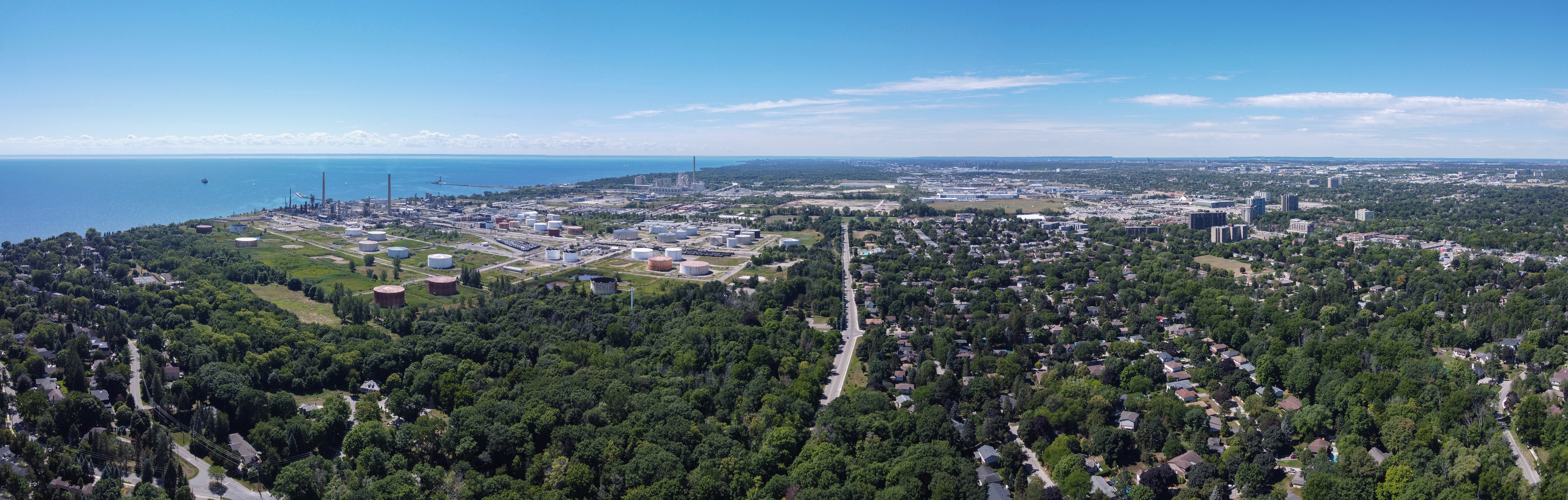
- Aerial view of Clarkson, Mississauga, 2022

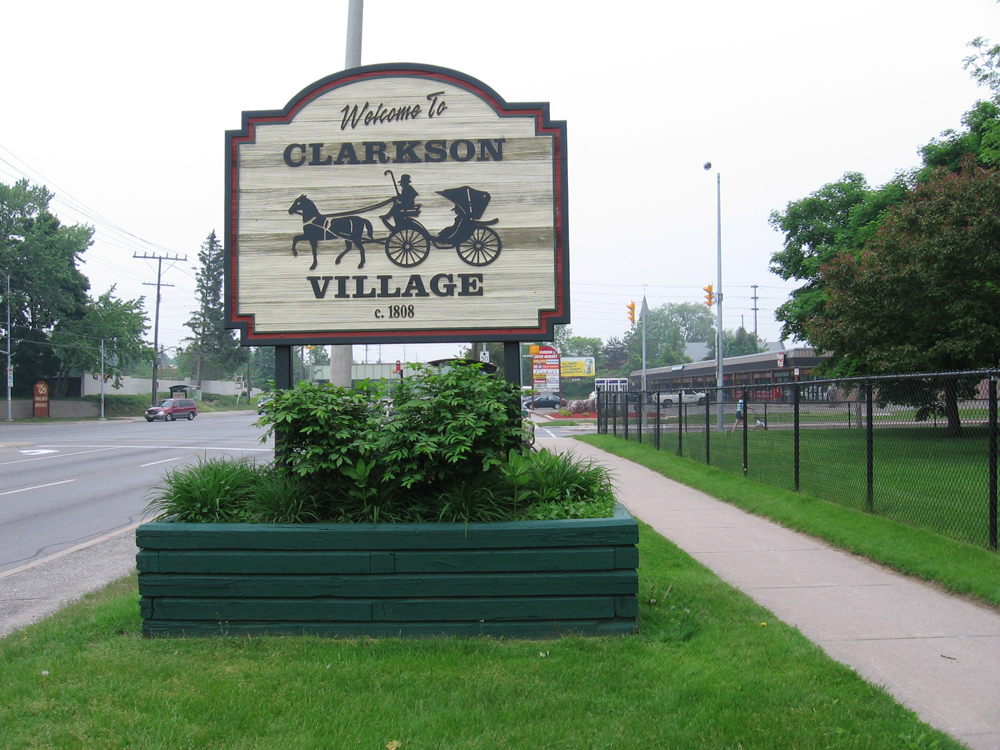
- Clarkson Village welcome sign, at Lakeshore Road West and Inverhouse Drive.
- Interactive map of Clarkson
- Coordinates: 43°31′9″N 79°38′2″W
- Country: Canada
- Province: Ontario
- Regional municipality: Peel
- City: Mississauga
- Established: 1808
- Time zone: UTC-5 (Eastern)
  - Summer (DST): UTC-4 (Eastern)
- Forward sortation area: L5J
- Area codes: 905 and 289
- NTS Map: 30M12 Brampton
- GNBC Code: FAREC

Clarkson, also called Clarkson Village, is a neighbourhood in the city of Mississauga, Ontario, Canada, situated in the southwest corner of the city, along the shore of Lake Ontario. It is bordered by Lake Ontario to the south, Oakville to the west, Erindale and Erin Mills to the north, and Lorne Park to the east.

== History ==
In 1808, fifteen-year-old Warren Clarkson and his brother Joshua left their home in Albany, New York to seek their fortune in Canada. They had been invited to come work for a friend of the family who had bought land near Lake Ontario. Warren liked the area very much and decided to stay. He worked hard so that someday he would be able to own property. When he was twenty-six he had saved enough money to buy land and build a home. Warren married and began to raise a family. As the years went by Warren bought more land. He built the community's first store along the stagecoach trail. Fifteen years later the town council named this trail Clarkson Road.

A post office was opened in the family store and William Clarkson, Warren's son became the postmaster. For the next forty five years a member of the Clarkson family would run the post office. Clarkson community never grew very large. It had a few houses and shops along Clarkson Road, a railway station, a school, and a church. Less than one hundred people lived in the quiet community.

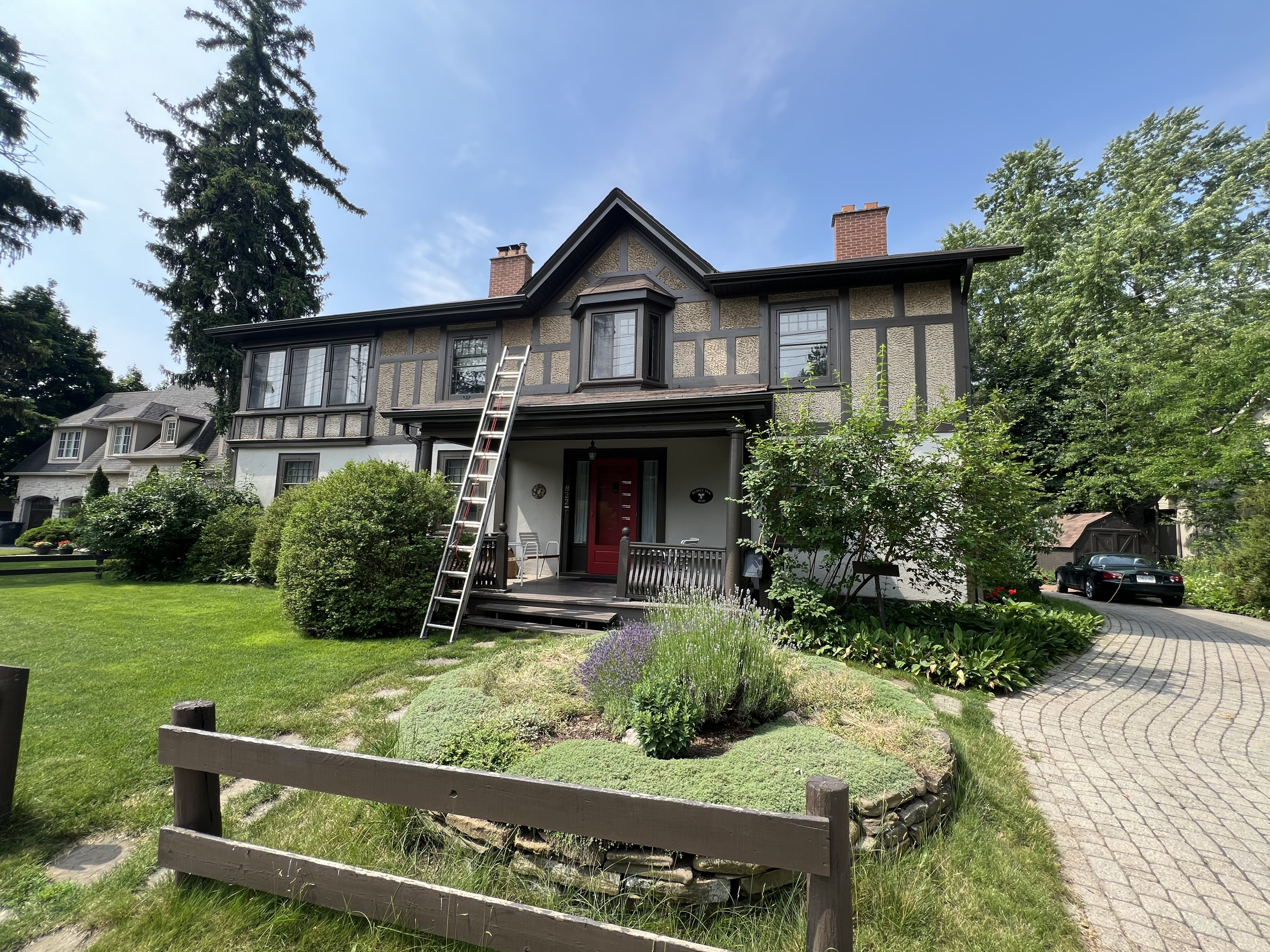
Bush's Inn

In 1856, Captain Edward Sutherland (1794-1885) moved to Clarkson with his seven children. A widower, he purchased "Bush's Inn," a former inn and coach house that was the halfway point between Hamilton, Ontario and Toronto (this building, a private residence, still stands on Clarkson Road South). Here, he is said to have introduced both strawberry and raspberry cultivation to the area. Clarkson eventually became the "Strawberry Capital of Ontario," and commercial fruit farming expanded in the area through the rest of the 19th and into the early 20th century. In 1915, a sign was erected at the Clarkson railway station declaring "Through this station passes more strawberries than any other station in Ontario." The Sutherlands later became connected by marriage to the Harrises of Benares (see "Sites of Interest" below).

The Party Line newspaper published out of Clarkson/Lorne Park, starting in 1951.

Park Royal, the second subdivision to be built in Clarkson, was developed by the Leonard W. Finch, President of the United Lands Corporation, on 900 acres of land west of Fifth Line West (present Southdown Road) to East Townline Road (present Winston Churchill Boulevard) and south of the QEW. This development is of note because it was designed with all the electrical cables and wires underground and the office buildings were designed to be shorter than the trees. It was designed as a community with accommodations for schools, parks, a recreation centre and a library. On August 8, 1958 Park Royal was opened by the Lord Mayor of London, Sir Denis H. Truscott. On February 28, 1971, the Clarkson Community Centre and Arena was opened.

== Today ==
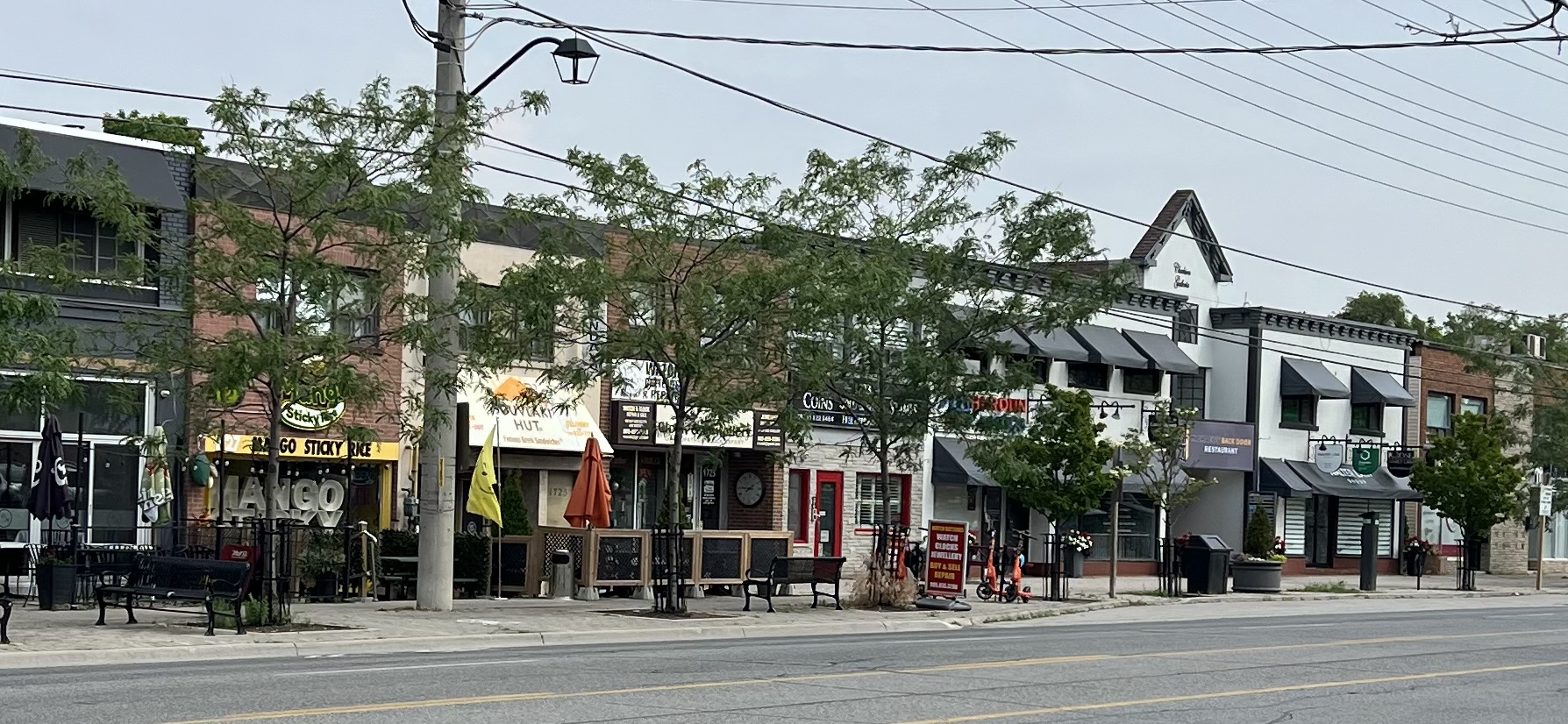
Clarkson Village, looking eastward at Lakeshore Road West

Although the community and the surrounding area consists mostly of a mix of upper- and middle-class homes, some of the last major industrial sites in Mississauga outline the community, including:

- a Suncor oil refinery, which produces lubricants (formerly Petro-Canada). The facility has two 400 ft (122m) tall smokestacks.
- a Holcim Canada (formerly St. Lawrence Cement) Cement plant, which distributes cement via truck throughout Toronto. The Plant has a 556 ft(169.4m) tall smokestack which was the tallest structure in Mississauga for over 50 years from the time of its completion in 1956 until the completion of the Absolute World tower in 2011.
- CFRB 1010 AM Radio Transmitter, with 4 identical guyed masts which stand 550 ft (167.6m) tall making them some of the tallest structures in the city. They are regularly used for navigation by small aircraft and watercraft. Located at the intersection of Southdown Rd. & Lakeshore Rd.
- 1050 CHUM AM Radio Transmitter, a smaller transmission facility, located along the waterfront, located adjacent to St. Lawrence Cement factory
- Orion Bus Industries, a major manufacturer of buses for public transportation.
- Electrovaya, a manufacturer of portable computers and batteries.
- an assortment of small farms.

== Sites of interest ==
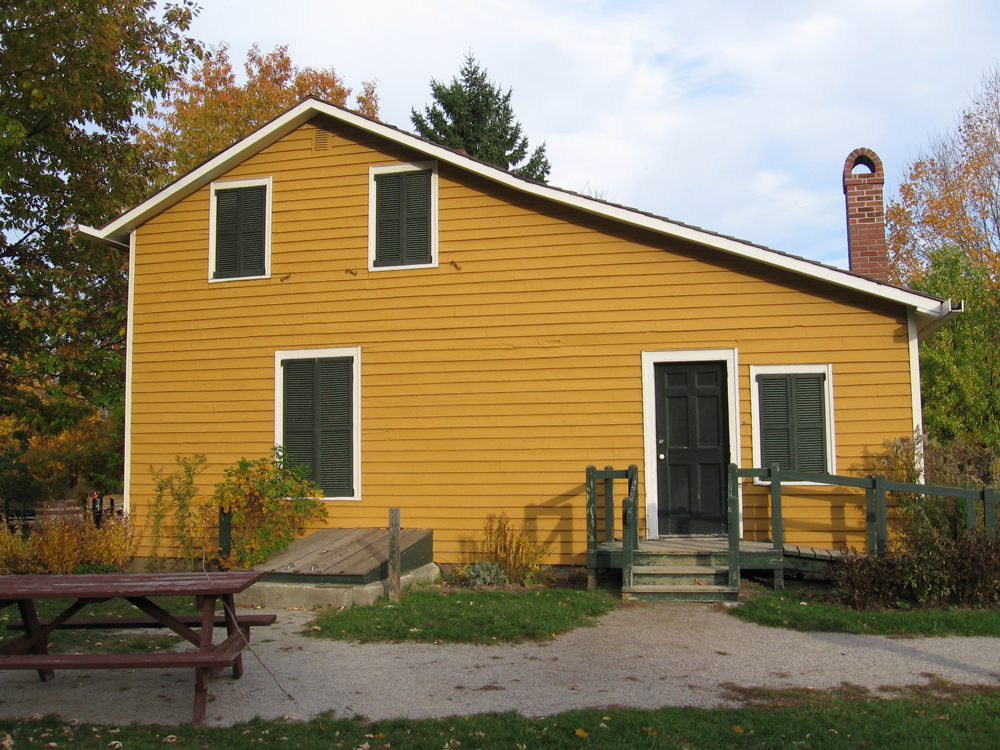
The historic Bradley Museum

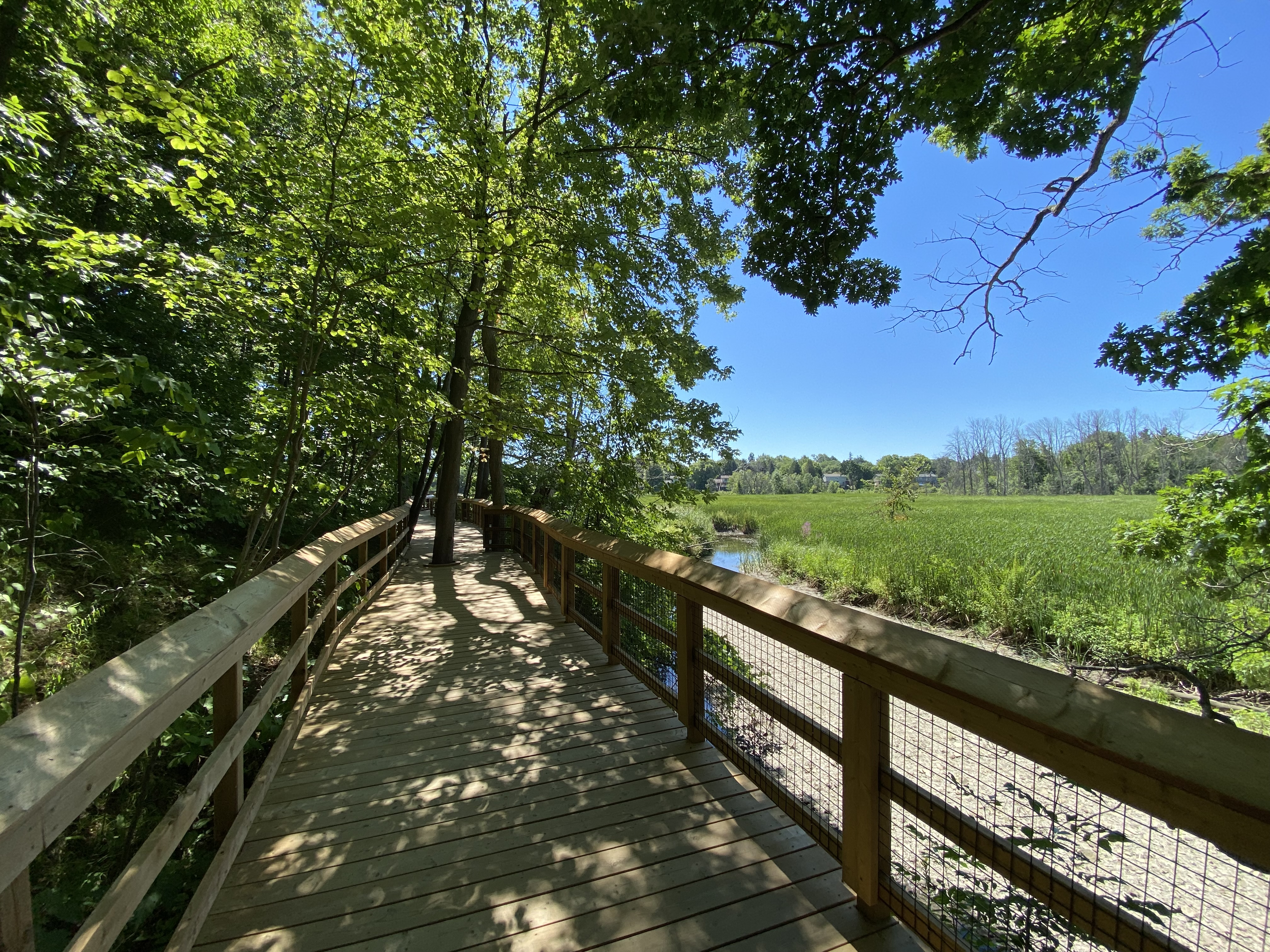
Rattray Marsh Conservation Area

Clarkson is home to both of the City of Mississauga's historic museums: Bradley Museum and Benares House.

The Bradley Museum provides a window into the everyday life of early settlers in Ontario, and hosts Sunday teas, rotating exhibits, and special events. The museum grounds include the original farmhouse built in 1830 by Lewis and Elizabeth Bradley, a United Loyalist couple who lived in the house with their seven children. The Anchorage, a Regency-style cottage built in 1837, was moved from its original location on the shores of Lake Ontario to the Bradley grounds in 1978. The Anchorage was the retirement home of Royal Navy Officer John Skynner (1762-1846), and remained derelict after being moved to the museum grounds until sufficient funds for its rehabilitation were raised in 1991. In December 2007, the Log Cabin was opened at Bradley after extensive fundraising efforts which saw the cabin moved from its location in Port Credit and repaired to its former glory. The Log Cabin is a popular choice for meetings and provides a popular overnight program for Girl Guides and Boy Scouts.

Benares House, located on the border between Clarkson and the neighbouring community of Lorne Park, was inhabited by four generations of the Harris and Sayers families. Rumored to be the inspiration for Canadian author Mazo de la Roche's famous "Whiteoak Chronicles" (or "Jalna series") novels, the Benares estate and most of its contents were donated to the Ontario Heritage Foundation by the great-grandchildren of Captain Harris. The site was fully restored and opened to the public in 1995. Benares now houses an interpretive gallery and hosts special events. Within the Clarkson/Lorne Park community, there are numerous streets dedicated to Roche, namely "Jalna Ave." and "Mazo Cres.", located in Lorne Park, and Clarkson, respectively.

Bell Gairdner Estate, is located at 2700 Lakeshore Road West is part of the Holcim Waterfront Estate. Built in 1937 for Charles Powell Bell, it was named for his wife Kathleen Harding as Harding House. Bell died and his wife remarried James Arthur Gairdner, for whom shares the current name of the home with Bell. It was later sold to Ontario Hydro in 1961 and finally acquired by the city in 1991 and there after the home was restored for used for banquets and events.

The Modern Classical designed home faces Lake Ontario and located at the mouth of Joshua Creek (likely named for early settler Joshua Clarkson).

In addition to discovering these historic sites, visitors may also explore Rattray Marsh. This ecologically sensitive wetland is the last remaining lakefront marsh between Burlington, Ontario and Toronto, and provides opportunities for bird watching while strolling along boardwalks and well-maintained trails. Abundant displays of white trilliums, the floral emblem and provincial flower of Ontario, may be seen in late April and early May.

== Transportation ==
Clarkson is home to the Clarkson GO Station, the transportation hub of the community, located on the Lakeshore West line. Local transit service is provided by Mississauga Transit routes 13, 14, 14A, 23, 45, 45A, 43, 110, and 29, all of which feed into the GO station. Clarkson is also near the Erin Mills Parkway / Southdown Road interchange of the QEW. The main roads in the area are Lakeshore Road West, Southdown Road, and Royal Windsor Drive.
