= Sikhism in Canada =

Religious community

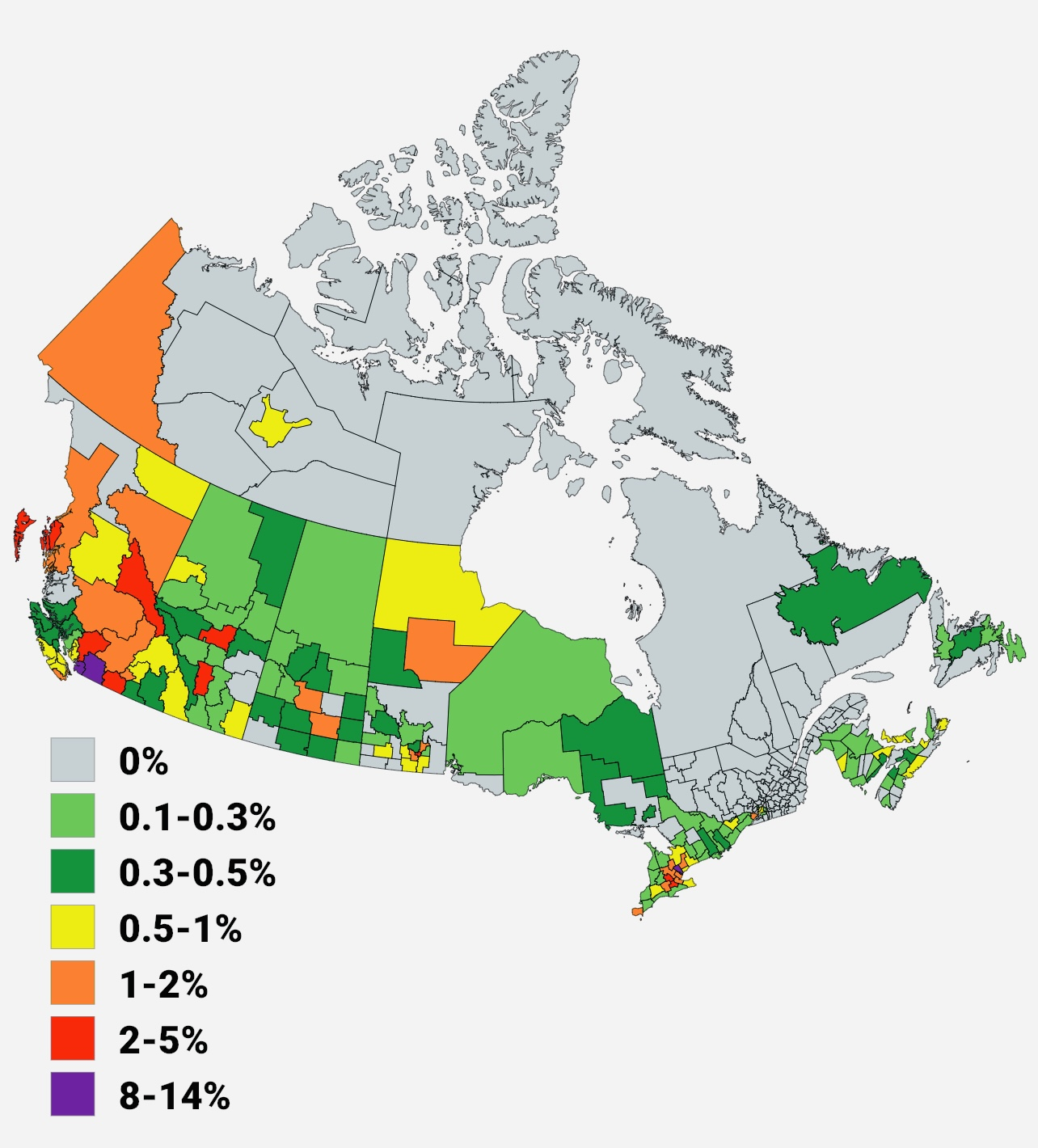
- Population distribution of Sikh Canadians by census division, 2021 census

Total population
- 771,790; 2.12% of the total Canadian population (2021)

Regions with significant populations
- Ontario: 300,435 (2.14%)
- British Columbia: 290,870 (5.92%)
- Alberta: 103,600 (2.48%)
- Manitoba: 35,470 (2.71%)
- Quebec: 23,345 (0.28%)

Languages
- Canadian English • Punjabi; Canadian French

Related ethnic groups
- American Sikhs; Australian Sikhs; British Sikhs; New Zealander Sikhs

Sikh Population History in Canada (Note: In the absence of official census data for Sikhs during the 1901, 1941, and 1951 censuses, the populations detailed are 95% of the total South Asian Canadian population enumerated in each respective census, based on the quote "From 1904 to the 1940s, 95% of all South Asian immigrants to Canada were Sikhs from the Punjab region of India.", taken from page 4 of the book "A Social History of South Asians in British Columbia". Figures for 1961 and 1971 use a falling decadal average of the Sikh proportion of the total South Asian Canadian between 95% in 1951, compared with 31.5% in 1981. This results in Sikhs forming 73.8% of the total South Asian Canadian population in 1961 and forming 52.6% of the total South Asian Canadian population in 1971. The total South Asian Canadian population in the 1961 census was 6,774 persons, and 67,925 persons in the 1971 census. Immigration data collected on the 2001 and 2011 census indicate there were 1,290 Sikh immigrants in Canada in 1961, and 9,655 Sikh immigrants in Canada in 1971, an undercount as this did not include the native-born population.)
Year	Pop.	±%
1901	95	—
1911	1,758	+1750.5%
1921	849	−51.7%
1931	1,173	+38.2%
1941	1,465	+24.9%
1951	2,040	+39.2%
1961	5,000	+145.1%
1971	35,730	+614.6%
1981	67,715	+89.5%
1991	147,440	+117.7%
2001	278,410	+88.8%
2011	454,965	+63.4%
2021	771,790	+69.6%
Source: Statistics Canada

Sikhism is the fourth-largest religion in Canada, with nearly 800,000 adherents, or 2.1% of Canada's population, as of 2021. The largest Sikh populations in Canada are found in Ontario, followed by British Columbia and Alberta. As of the 2021 Census, more than half of Canada's Sikhs, Approximately 52.9% can be found in these 4 cities: Brampton (163,260), Surrey (154,415), Calgary (49,465), and Edmonton (41,385).

Canada is home to the largest national Sikh proportion in the world (2.1%), and also has the second-largest Sikh population in the world, after India. British Columbia has the third-largest Sikh proportion (5.9%) amongst all global administrative divisions, behind only Punjab and Chandigarh in India. British Columbia, Manitoba, and Yukon hold the distinction of being three of the only four administrative divisions in the world with Sikhism as the second most followed religion among the population. (Note: Sikhism is the second-largest religion in British Columbia, Manitoba, and Yukon. Per the 2011 Indian census, Sikhism is the largest religion in Punjab and second in Chandigarh. These are the only two Indian states/UTs where Sikhism is one of the two most common religions.)

== History ==
=== Background ===
In 1809, Charles Metcalfe, acting as the representative for the British East India Company, signed a treaty with Maharaja Ranjit Singh of the Sikh Empire, which led to the safeguarding of the cis-Sutlej states. Metcalfe would form a relationship with a Sikh lady from the Lahore court, who would birth three sons. Metcalfe later moved to Canada and served as the Governor General of the Province of Canada and Lieutenant Governor of Canada West and Canada East, from 1843–1845.

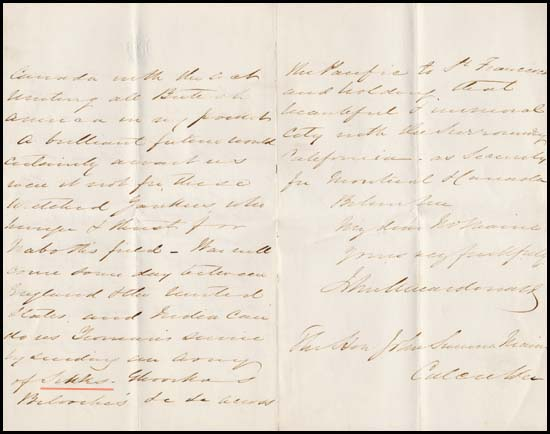
"The Invasion of San Francisco" letter written by John A. Macdonald to Henry Sumner Maine, dated 9 April 1867 (with the word "Sikhs" underlined in red)

On 9 April 1867, in a letter written by John A. Macdonald to Sir Henry Sumner Maine on the topic of a potential future war between England and the United States, he stated: "War will come someday between England and the United States and India can do us yeoman's service by sending an army of Sikhs, Ghoorkas, Belooches etc. etc. across the Pacific to San Francisco and holding that beautiful and immortal city with the surrounding California — as security for Montreal and Canada." (Note: Full transcript of the letter: 48 Dover Street Piccadilly London April 9/1867 My Dear Mr. Maine, By this time you must almost have forgotten our pleasant meeting at Oxford in June ’65 when the University made you a D.C.I. on your own merits, and conferred the same degree on Canada in my person. I then promised you a copy of the Code of Lower Canada. Altho[ugh] the Comissioners completed it some time ago it was only at our last session that Parl’t made it law. I now send you the Code as it was enacted. You are aware that the Code Napoleon [was] never obtained in Lower Canada as the Conquest by Wolfe preceded the Revolution. There was a complete solution of continuity between old & young France & the latter continued to be governed by the “Coutume de Paris” amended from time to time by ordinances & arrest of the French Kings – and also after the Conquest by ordinances of the kings of England & since 1791 by statutes of the Provincial Legislature. All these laws are Codified now. I am not much of a Civilian myself and cannot judge but I am told the work is well done. The Commissioners I know to be able men and they had the advantage of following not only the Code Napoleon but always the Code for Louisiana. They had besides the benefit of knowing well the Commercial law of England and all that it gained or stole from the Civil law. I shall send the volumes to the India office & I hope it will reach you safely. As I know that I have afflicted you with or inflicted upon you the necessity for acknowledgement of the receipt of my parcel may I (if it can be done without inconvenience) ask you to draw upon your patience so far as to inform me what course of preliminary study would be most profitable for a young Barrister going to India. I have a Cousin – a Clever young fellow by the way, who has taken his courses at Oxford now heading for the Bar & he has a fancy for India. He wants to get on to the Barristers most in request in India. If you will add to the kindness by - giving me your opinion as to the best place to open office, you will much oblige me. He is not particular – Calcutta or Madras or Rampur are all the same to him. Pray pardon my troubling you in this matter. I have been in England since November & have at last succeeded. I sail in four days for Canada with the act uniting all British America in my pocket. A brilliant future would certainly await us were it not for those wretched Yankees who hunger & thirst for Naboth’s field – War will come someday between England & the United States and India can do us Yeoman’s service by sending an army of Sikhs – Ghoorkas, Belooches etc.etc. across the Pacific to San Francisco and holding that beautiful & immoral City with the surrounding California – as security for Montreal & Canada. Bless You My dear Mr. Maine Yours very faithfully John A Macdonald)

The British East India Company annexed most of the Punjab after the Second Anglo-Sikh War in 1849, incorporating the territory and its inhabitants into the colonial-empire. Sikhs were recruited into the British military forces immediately after, with Sikhs being rewarded with military ranks due to their loyalty to the British cause during the Indian rebellion of 1857.

=== Early immigration ===
Though not a religious Sikh, the first-person of Sikh ancestry in Canada was Prince Victor Duleep Singh, son of maharaja Duleep Singh. Victor Duleep Singh was posted to Halifax in 1888 as Honorary Aide-de-Camp to General Sir John Ross. Victor Duleep Singh returned to England in February 1890.

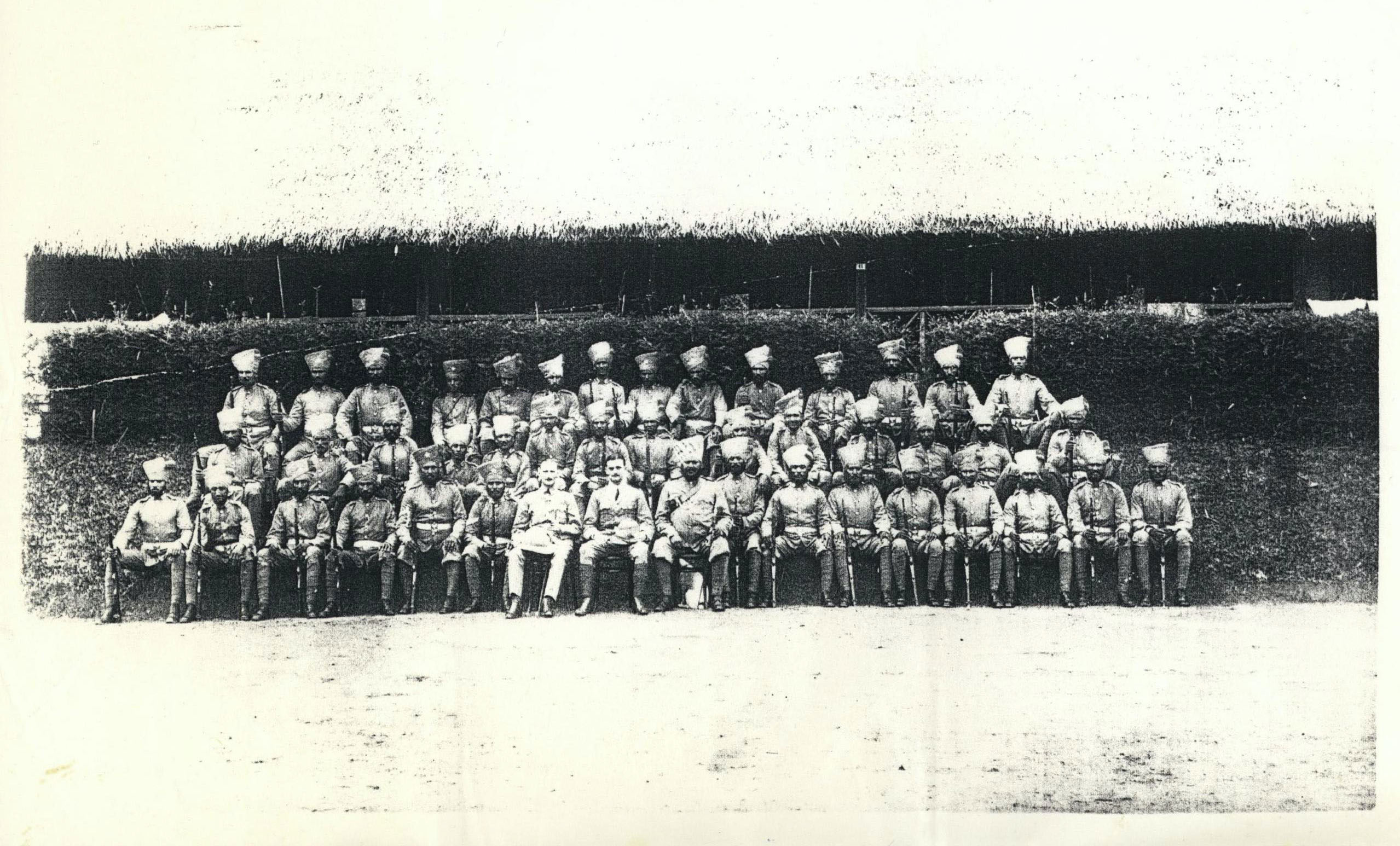
Group photograph of the Sikh regiment in British Columbia, Canada after Queen Victoria's Diamond Jubilee, 1897

Kesur Singh, a Risaldar Major in the British India Army, is credited with being the first Sikh settler in Canada. He was amongst a group of Sikh officers who arrived in Vancouver on board Empress of India in 1897. They were on the way to Queen Victoria's Diamond Jubilee. Sikh regiments were brought to Canada for the 1897 celebration.

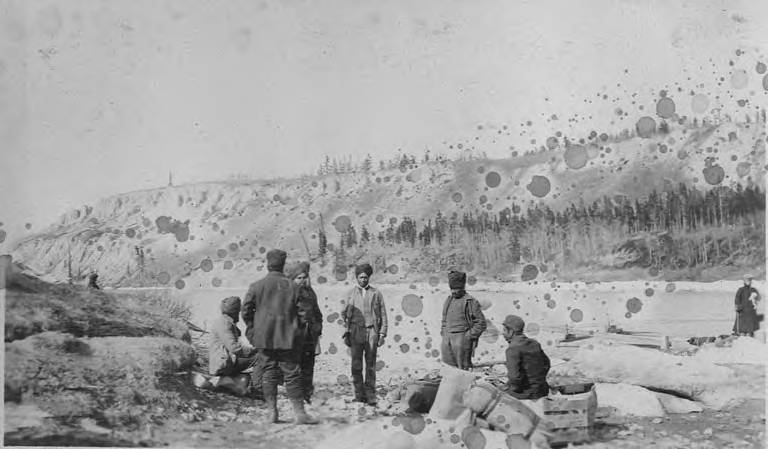
Punjabi Sikhs in Whitehorse, Yukon, April 1906

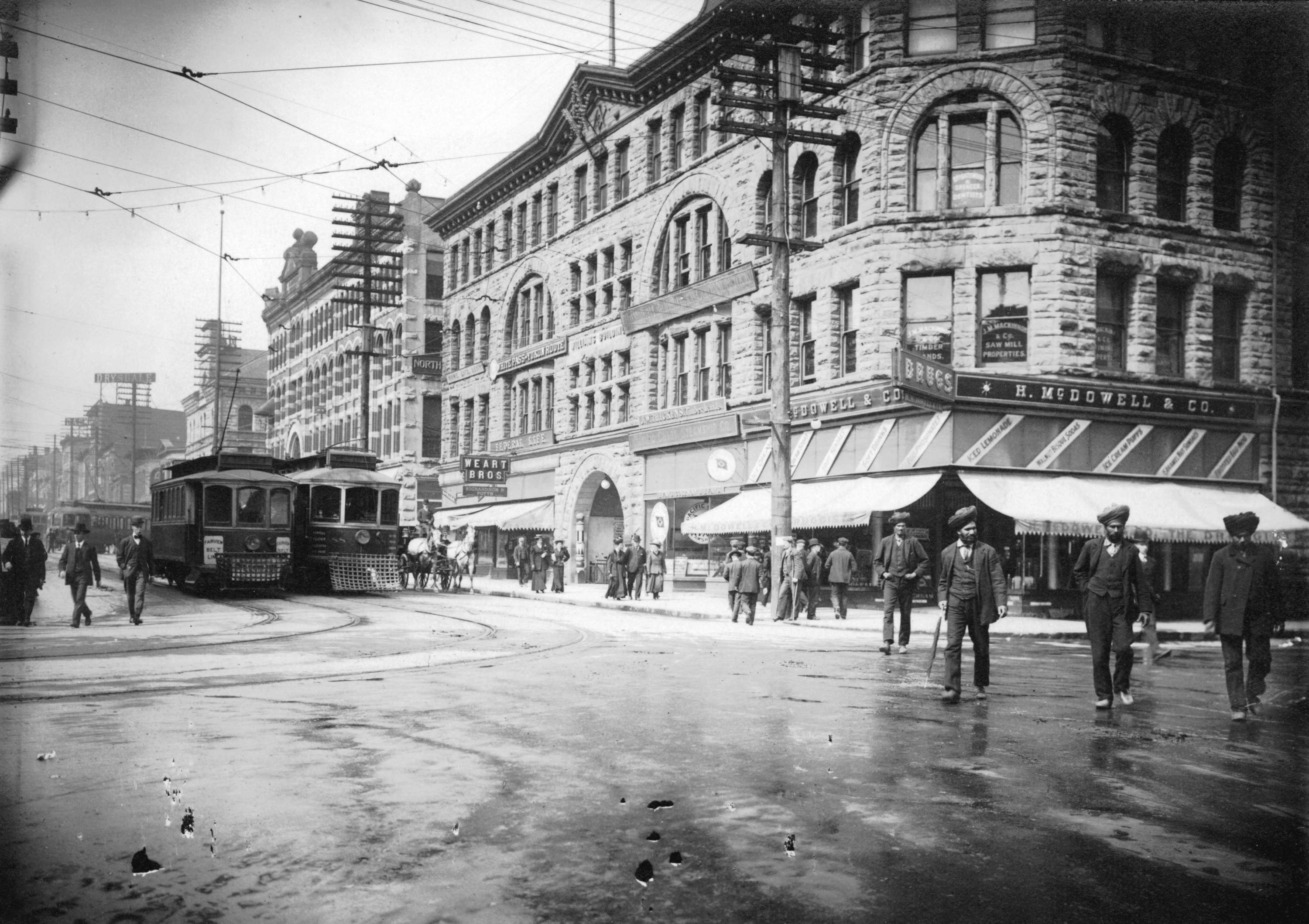
Sikhs in Vancouver, 1908

A notable moment in early Sikh history in Canada was in 1902 when settlers first arrived in Golden, British Columbia to work at the Columbia River Lumber Company. This was a theme amongst most early Punjabi Sikh settlers in Canada to find work in the agricultural and forestry sectors in British Columbia. Punjabi Sikhs became a prominent ethnic group within the sawmill workforce in British Columbia almost immediately after initial arrival to Canada.

Sikhs found employment in laying the tracks of the Canadian Pacific Railway, in lumber mills and mines. Though they earned less than white workers, they made enough money to send some of it to India and make it possible for their relatives to immigrate to Canada. In 1902, a local Khalsa Diwan chapter was already established in the United States, it would not be until 1906 until a Khalsa Diwan chapter was established in Vancouver. In 1904, Man Singh brought over a Guru Granth Sahib scripture to Canada.

From 1904 to the 1940s, 95% of all South Asian immigration to Canada were Sikhs from the Punjab. Between the years 1903 to 1906, the early Sikh pioneers in Canada living on the west coast of British Columbia received little government or press attention, with them finding their newfound home welcoming and inviting. At the time, the Canadian government was focused on restricting Chinese and Japanese immigration, so the early Sikh migrants went relatively unnoticed between those years. However, this would not last long and in 1906, after 700 South Asian migrants arrived in Canada, their disenfranchisement began.

South Asian immigration to Canada, 1904–1907
Years	Numbers of immigrants
1904–05	45
1905–06	387
1906–07	2,124
1907–08	2,623
Total	5,179

The early settlers in Golden built the first Gurdwara (Sikh Temple) in Canada and North America in 1905, which would later be destroyed by fire in 1926. The second Gurdwara to be built in Canada was in 1908 in Kitsilano (Vancouver), aimed at serving a growing number of Punjabi Sikh settlers who worked at nearby sawmills along False Creek at the time. The Vancouver Sikh temple's original structure was heavily influenced architecturally by the Chief Khalsa Diwan temple in Hong Kong, which was a common stopping-point for Sikhs on the journey to Canada. The Gurdwara would later close and be demolished in 1970, with the temple society relocating to the newly built Gurdwara on Ross Street, in South Vancouver.

As a result, the oldest existing Gurdwara in Canada today is the Gur Sikh Temple, located in Abbotsford, British Columbia. Built in 1911, the temple was designated as a national historic site of Canada in 2002 and is the third-oldest Gurdwara in the country. Later, the fourth Gurdwara to be built in Canada was established in 1912 in Victoria on Topaz Avenue, while the fifth soon was built at the Fraser Mills (Coquitlam) settlement in 1913, followed a few years later by the sixth at the Queensborough (New Westminster) settlement in 1919, and the seventh at the Paldi (Vancouver Island) settlement, also in 1919.

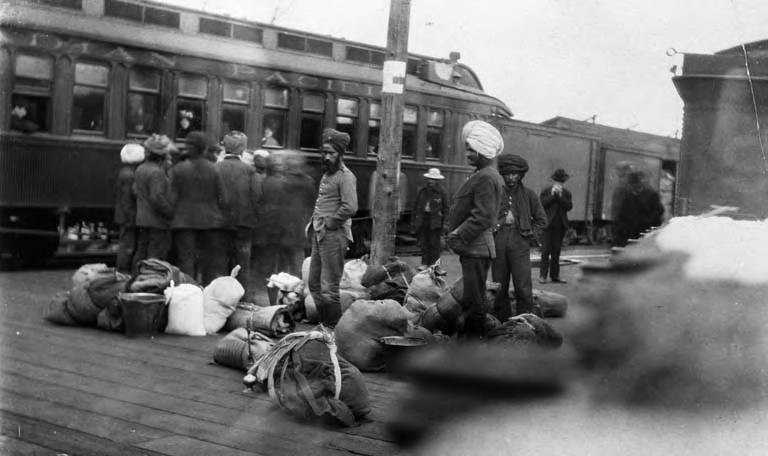
Sikhs next to CPR, Vancouver, c. 1905–1914

Early Sikh pioneers also settled in the Abbotsford area in 1905 and originally worked on farms and in the lumber industry. Although most of the immigrants from South Asia at the time were Sikhs, local ignorance of Eastern religions led to them frequently being assumed to be Hindus. About 90% of these Sikhs lived in British Columbia. While Canadian politicians, missionaries, unions and the press were opposed to Asian workers British Columbia industrialists were short of labour and thus Sikhs were able to get an early foothold at the turn of the 20th century in British Columbia.

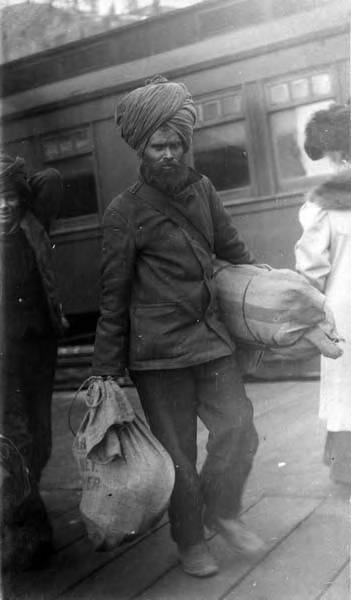
Sikh man on rail platform next to Canadian Pacific rail car, British Columbia, c. 1905–1914

As with the large numbers of Japanese and Chinese workers already present in Canada, many white workers resented those immigrants and directed their ill-will toward the Sikhs, who were easily recognized by their beards and turbans. Punjabis were accused of having a caste system, an idea that goes against the foundations of Sikhism. They were portrayed as being riddled with trachoma and as being unclean in general. To strengthen these racist characterizations, a song called White Canada Forever was created. All this eventually led to a boat of Sikhs arriving in Vancouver being sent to Victoria. In 1907, the year that Buckam Singh came to British Columbia from Punjab at the age of fourteen, race riots broke out in Vancouver between Whites and Asians (Chinese and Japanese). Punjabis were initially also targeted but “sent attacking white mobs fleeing” as majority of the Punjabis were former soldiers of the Sikh regiment and Punjab regiments, many of whom even after retirement and migrating to Canada, kept their service muskets and bayonets and at the minimum, daggers and swords in their households, often ceremonial religious swords which had been kept as sidearms during war.

Most of the Sikhs in Canada in 1907 were retired British army veterans and their families. These Punjabis had proved themselves as loyal soldiers in the British colonies in Asia and Africa. However, the Canadian Government did not prevent the use of the illegal scare tactics being used to monitor immigration and prevent Sikhs from seeking employment, and this soon resulted in the cessation of all Indian immigration to Canada. The Canadian Prime Minister, Sir Wilfrid Laurier claimed that Indians were unsuited to life in the Canadian climate. However, in a letter to the viceroy, The Earl of Minto, Sir Wilfred voiced a different opinion, stating that the Chinese were the least adaptable to Canadian ways, whereas Sikhs, which he mistakenly referred to as Hindus, were the most adaptable. Nevertheless, 1,072 Sikhs left for California in 1907. In the same year, the Khalsa Diwan society was set up in Vancouver with branches in Abbotsford, New Westminster, Fraser Mills, Duncan Coombs and Ocean Falls.

In March 1907, provincial legislation was introduced in British Columbia to bar Sikhs from the right-to-vote. A month later in April, Sikhs were disallowed from voting in municipal Vancouver due to an amendment made to the Municipality Incorporation Act. As a result, Sikhs were effectively blocked from being able to vote in federal elections. This deprivation of the right-to-vote of Sikhs would continue for the next forty years.

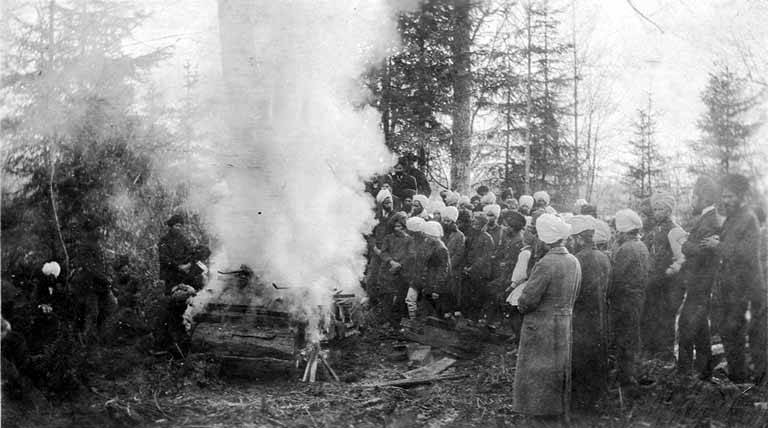
Sikhs attending a funeral outside Vancouver, c. 1914

In 1908, Indians were asked by the Canadian Government to leave Canada voluntarily and settle in British Honduras; it was stated that the "Mexican" climate would better suit Indians. A Sikh delegate was sent to what is now Belize and stayed in the British colony for some time before returning. Upon his return, he advised not only Sikhs, but also the members of other Indian religious groups, to decline the offer, maintaining that conditions in Latin America were unsuitable for Punjabis, although they might be more amenable to South Indians. In 1908, 1,710 Sikhs left British Columbia for California. The first plans to build a temple were made in 1908. After a property was acquired, the settlers carried lumber from a local mill on their backs up a hill to construct a gurdwara.

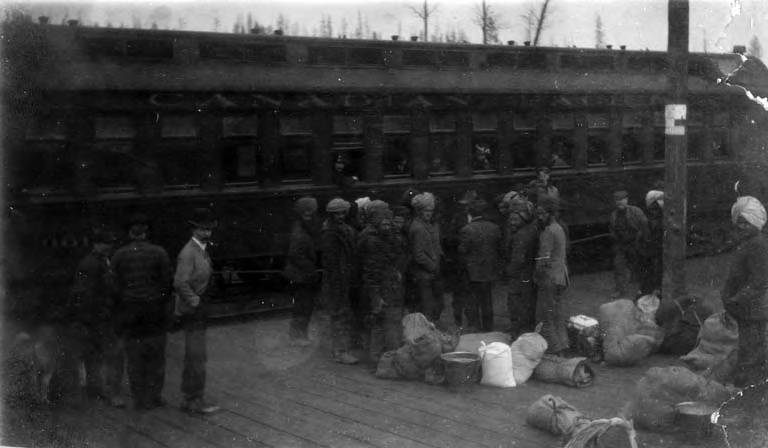
Sikh and Caucasian men on rail platform next to Canadian Pacific rail car, British Columbia, c. 1905–1914

William Lyon Mackenzie King (not yet the Canadian Prime Minister) visited London and Calcutta to express the Canadian view of Indian immigration. As a result, the Indian Government stopped advertising facilities and employment opportunities in North America. This invoked the provisions of Emigration Act of 1883 which stopped Sikhs from leaving Canada. The Canadian Government passed two laws, one providing that an immigrant had to have 200 dollars, a steep increase from the previous requirement of 20 dollars, the other authorizing the Minister of the Interior to prohibit entry into Canada to people not arriving from their birth-country by continuous journey and through tickets purchased before leaving the country of their birth or citizenship. These laws were specifically directed at Punjabis and resulted in their population, which had exceeded 5,000 people in 1911, dropping to little more than 2,500.

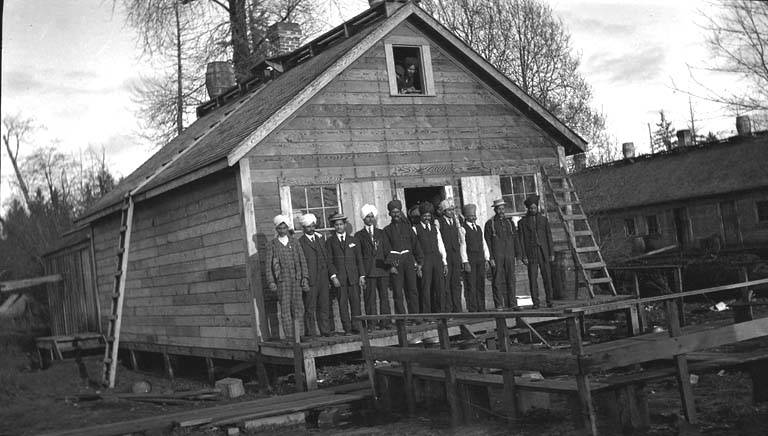
Sikhs at a lumber camp in British Columbia, c. 1914

The Immigration Act, 1910 came under scrutiny when a party of 39 Indians, mostly Sikhs, arriving on a Japanese ship, the Komagata Maru, succeeded in obtaining habeas corpus against the immigration department's order of deportation. The Canadian Government then passed a law intended to keep labourers and artisans, whether skilled or unskilled, out of Canada by preventing them from landing at any dock in British Columbia. As Canadian immigration became stricter, more Indians, most of them Sikhs, travelled south to the United States of America.

The Gur Sikh Temple opened on February 26, 1911; Sikhs and non-Sikhs from across British Columbia attended the ceremony and a local newspaper reported on the event. It was the third Gurdwara to open - after Golden (1905) and Kitsilano (1908) - not only in North America, but also anywhere in the world outside of South Asia, and as the oldest existing Gurdwara in Canada in the contemporary age has since become a national historical landmark and symbol, the only Gurdwara to have similar status outside India. The Khalsa Diwan Society subsequently built Gurdwaras in Vancouver and Victoria. The first and only Sikh settlement in Canada, Paldi, British Columbia was established as a mill town in 1916.

Though the objectives of the Khalsa Diwan Society were religious, educational and philanthropic, problems connected to immigration and racism loomed in its proceedings. Alongside the Sikh Diwan, other organizations were set up to counteract the policies of the immigration authorities. The United India League operated in Vancouver, and the Hindustani Association of the Pacific Coast opened in Portland, Oregon. Gurdwaras became storm centres of political activity. The Ghadar Party was founded in America in 1913 by Sikhs who had fled to California from British Columbia as a consequence of Canadian immigration rules. Despite originally being directed at the racism encountered by Sikhs in the Sacramento Valley and in Sacramento itself, it eventually moved to British Columbia. Thousands of Ghadar journals were published with some even being sent to India.

==== Komagata Maru incident ====
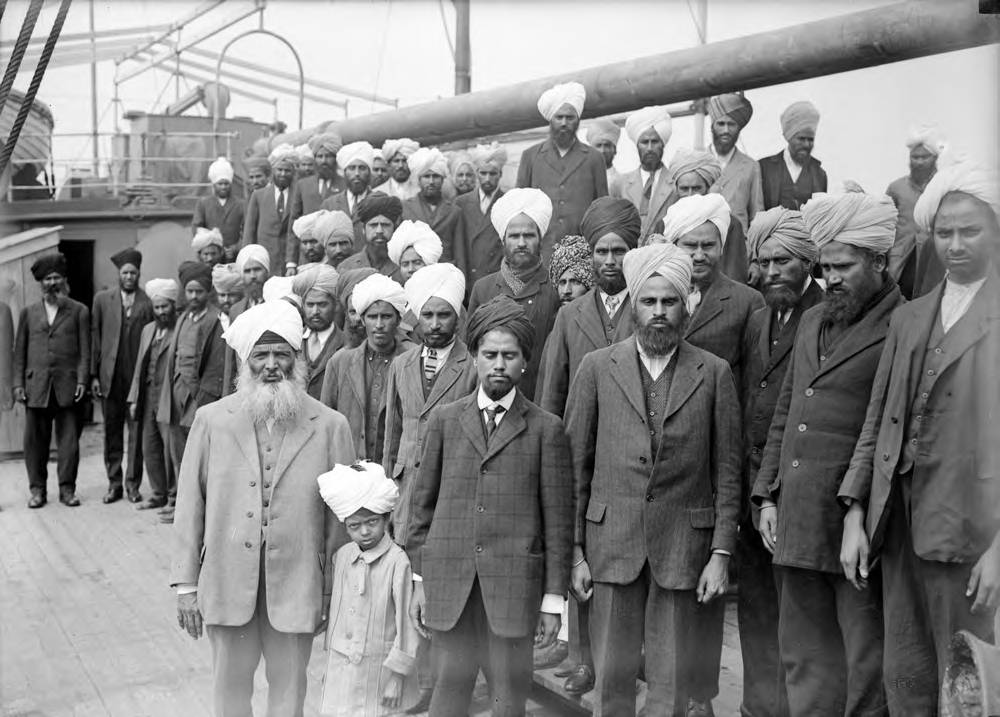
Sikhs aboard Komagata Maru, 1914. Gurdit Singh wearing light coloured suit, white beard, left foreground.

In 1908, a series of ordinances were passed by the federal government, by which Indian immigrants entering Canada had to have 200 Canadian dollars (vs. 25 for Europeans). They also had to arrive directly from the area of birth/nationality- even though there was no direct route between India and Canada. Because of this legislation, in 1914, a Japanese ship called Komagata Maru chartered by a Sikh businessman which sailed from Hong Kong to Vancouver (with multiple stops) was not allowed to dock at the final port. The ship, which had 376 passengers (340 Sikhs), had to spend over 2 months offshore and only 20 former Canadian residents were allowed to disembark. In 1914, Buckam Singh moved to Toronto. Also in 1914, Gurdit Singh Sandhu, from Sarhali, Amritsar, was a well-to-do businessman in Singapore who was aware of the problems that Punjabis were having in getting to Canada due to exclusion laws. He initially wanted to circumvent these laws by hiring a boat to sail from Calcutta to Vancouver. His aim was to help his compatriots whose journeys to Canada had been blocked. In order to achieve his goal, Gurdit Singh purchased the Komagata Maru, a Japanese vessel. Gurdit Singh carried 340 Sikhs, 24 Muslims, and 12 Hindus in his boat to Canada.

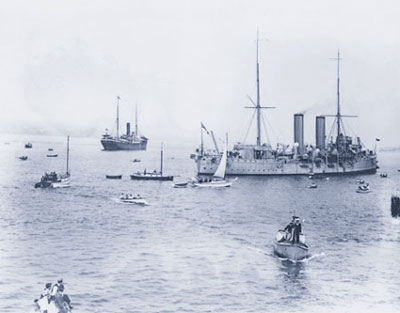
Komagata Maru (furthest ship on the left)

When the ship arrived in Canada, it was not allowed to dock. The Conservative Premier of British Columbia, Richard McBride, issued a categorical statement that the passengers would not be allowed to disembark. Meanwhile, a "Shore Committee" had been formed with the participation of Hussain Rahim and Sohan Lal Pathak. Protest meetings were held in Canada and the USA. At one, held in Dominion Hall, Vancouver, it was resolved that if the passengers were not allowed off, Indo-Canadians should follow them back to India to start a rebellion (or Ghadar). The shore Committee raised $22,000 dollars as an instalment on chartering the ship. They also launched a test case legal battle in the name of Munshi Singh, one of the passengers. Further, the Khalsa Diwan Society (founded 1907 to manage Vancouver's gurudwara) offered to pay the 200 dollar admittance fee for every passenger, which was denied.

On July 7, the full bench of the Supreme Court gave a unanimous judgment that under new Orders-In-Council it had no authority to interfere with the decisions of the Department of Immigration and Colonization. The Japanese captain was relieved of duty by the angry passengers, but the Canadian government ordered the harbour tug Sea Lion to push the ship out on its homeward journey. On July 19, the angry passengers mounted an attack. Next day the Vancouver newspaper The Sun reported: "Howling masses of Hindus showered policemen with lumps of coal and bricks... it was like standing underneath a coal chute".

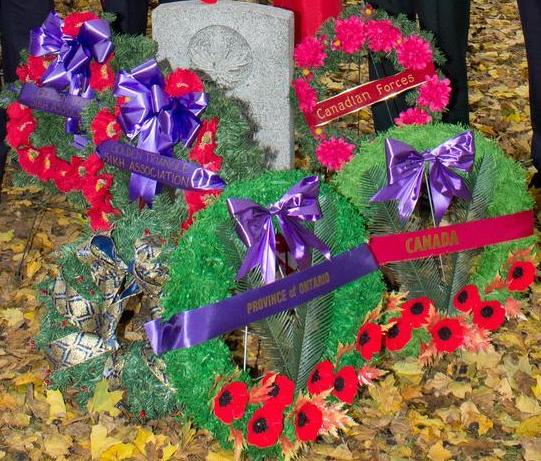
Private Buckam Singh gravestone, annual Sikh Remembrance Day service, Mount Hope Cemetery, Kitchener, Ontario 2012

The Komagata Maru arrived in Calcutta, India on September 26. Upon entry into the harbour, the ship was forced to stop by a British gunboat and with the passengers subsequently being placed under guard. The ship was then diverted approximately 27 kilometres (17 miles) to Budge Budge, where the British intended to put them on a train bound for Punjab. The passengers wanted to stay in Calcutta, and marched on the city, but were forced to return to Budge Budge and re-board the ship. The passengers protested, some refusing to re-board, and the police opened fire, killing 20 and wounding nine others. This incident became known as the Budge Budge Riot. Gurdit Singh managed to escape and lived in hiding until 1922. He was urged by Mohandas Gandhi to give himself up as a true patriot. He was imprisoned for five years.

==== First World War ====
At least ten Sikh soldiers are known to have fought in the Canadian military during the First World War. The names of these men are as follows.

1. John Baboo
2. Sunta Gougersingh
3. Buckam Singh
4. Hari Singh
5. Harnom Singh
6. John Singh
7. Lashman Singh
8. Ram Singh
9. Sewa Singh
10. Waryam Singh

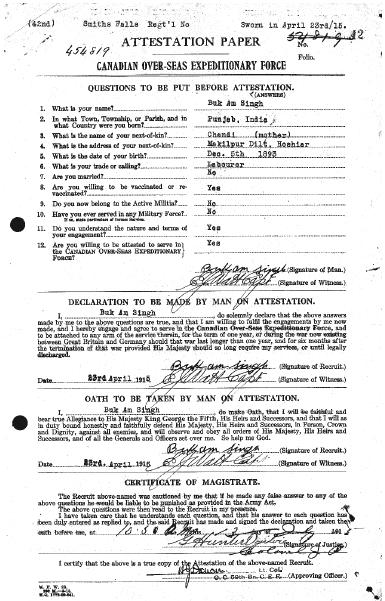
Private Buckam Singh attestation papers, World War I

Buckam Singh enlisted with the Canadian Expeditionary Force in the spring of 1915. Buckam Singh was one of the earliest known Sikhs living in Ontario at the time as well as one of only 9 Sikhs known to have served with Canadian troops in the First World War. Private Buckam Singh served with the 20th Canadian Infantry Battalion in the battlefields of Flanders during 1916. Here, Buckam Singh was wounded twice in battle and later received treatment at a hospital run by one of Canada's most famous soldier poets the Doctor Lt. Colonel John McCrae.

While recovering from his wounds in England, Private Buckam Singh contracted tuberculosis and spent his final days in a Kitchener, Ontario military hospital, dying at age 25 in 1919. His grave in Kitchener is the only known First World War Sikh Canadian soldier's grave in Canada. Despite being forgotten for ninety years and never getting to see his family again, Buckam Singh is now being celebrated as not only a Sikh hero, but a Canadian hero.

=== Growing government support ===
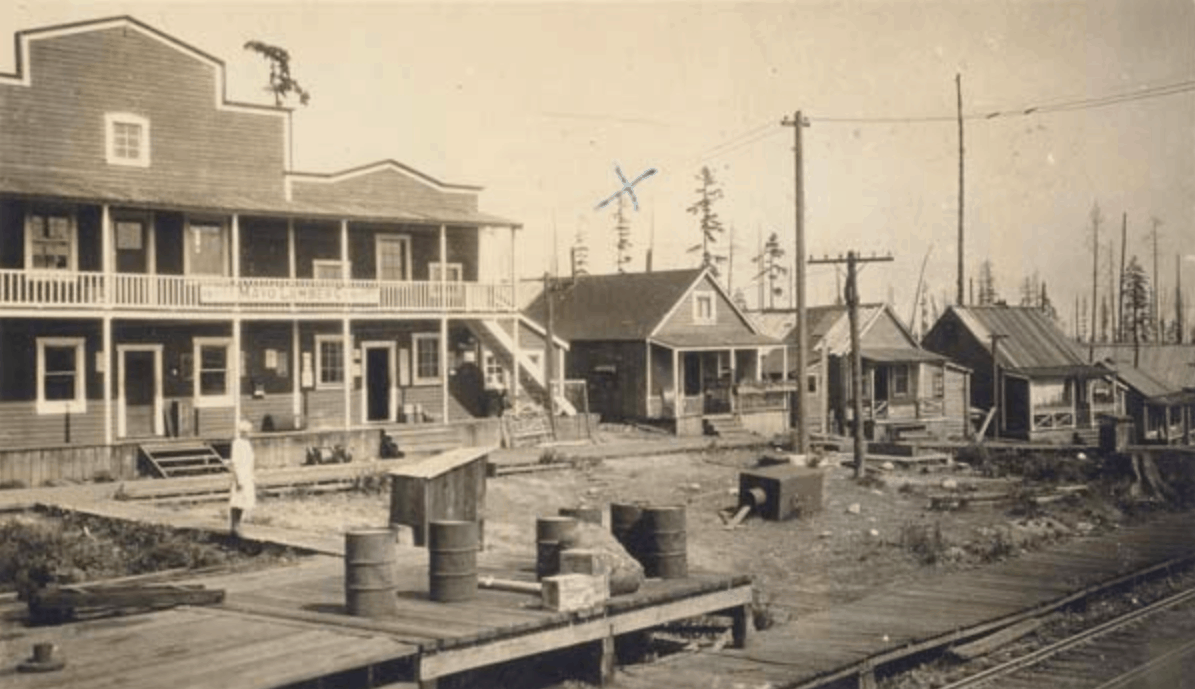
The Mayo Lumber Co. offices stand next to the train tracks in Paldi, British Columbia, late 1920s

Due to immigration restrictions, South Asians were not able to bring their relatives from India to Canada. Therefore, they resorted to illegal means to bring them to Canada. This was through the Washington-British Columbia border. When the Canadian Government became aware of the happenings along the borderline, they tightened immigration regulations and South Asian men who stayed even three days longer outside of Canada were denied entrance for violating the three-year limit.

In 1937, a controversy surfaced with there being almost three hundred illegal South Asian immigrants in BC. The case was investigated by the RCMP who had eventually solved the case. The Canadian government, however, decided to take this as an opportunity to negotiate with India and refused to deport illegal Sikh immigrants. In fact, the Canadian government pushed the Sikhs into gaining residency in Canada.

During the 1940s, South Asians in Canada began to establish their livelihoods despite deep social and economic disturbances. Unemployment was common and the average British Columbian's wage had dropped over 20 percent. White employers were willing to accept Asian workers, this produced insecurities amongst the mainstream community of British Columbia. The result of this was a British Columbia minimum wage law, a law that was ultimately flawed. 25 percent of the employees would be paid 25 percent less and these were invariably Asians. South Asians continued to live under one roof and in extensive families; this support helped them during the Depression period.

In 1943, a twelve-man delegation including members of the Khalsa Diwan Society presented the case of South Asian voting rights to Premier Hart. They said that without the ability to vote, in Canada they were nothing more than second-class citizens. The Premier then made it so that South Asians in British Columbia that had fought in World War II would be granted voting rights, this law was passed in 1945. By 1947, all South Asians had the right to vote due to the Sikh Khalsa Diwan Society. In 1944, a Khalsa Diwan Society survey showed there to be 1,756 Canadian Sikhs with 98% of them (1,715) living in British Columbia, the initial major port of immigration for Canadian Sikhs.

Sikh Canadians by settlement/municipality (1944)
Settlement/municipality	Province	Sikh population	%
Vancouver	British Columbia	462	0.17%
Victoria	British Columbia	338	0.77%
Paldi (Note: Located in the Cowichan Valley)	British Columbia	115	19.83%
Queensborough	British Columbia	103	3.82%
Hillcrest	British Columbia	54	—N/a
Honeymoon Bay	British Columbia	47	—N/a
Fraser Mills	British Columbia	44	7.97%
Kelowna	British Columbia	44	0.86%
North Vancouver	British Columbia	43	0.48%
Youbou	British Columbia	42	—N/a
Barnet (Note: Logging camp located between Burnaby and Port Moody.)	British Columbia	39	—N/a
Kamloops	British Columbia	39	0.65%
Duncan	British Columbia	30	1.37%
Ladner	British Columbia	27	2.9%
Abbotsford	British Columbia	26	4.63%
Sproat Lake	British Columbia	26	—N/a
Great Central (Note: Logging camp located near Port Alberni.)	British Columbia	22	—N/a
Mission	British Columbia	19	0.7%
Port Moody	British Columbia	19	1.26%
Agassiz	British Columbia	17	1.32%
Calgary	Alberta	16	0.02%
Port Alberni	British Columbia	16	0.89%
Port Hammond	British Columbia	16	—N/a
Bloedel (Note: Village north of Campbell River.)	British Columbia	15	—N/a
Mohawk	British Columbia	14	—N/a
Toronto	Ontario	12	0%
Cloverdale	British Columbia	11	0.58%
Timberland (Note: Logging camp located near Ladysmith.)	British Columbia	10	—N/a
Chilliwack	British Columbia	9	0.24%
Sahtlam	British Columbia	9	—N/a
Shawnigan Lake	British Columbia	9	—N/a
Haney	British Columbia	8	—N/a
Sardis	British Columbia	8	—N/a
Cariboo	British Columbia	7	—N/a
Chemainus	British Columbia	7	—N/a
Grand Forks	British Columbia	7	0.56%
Langley Prairie	British Columbia	5	0.06%
Ladysmith	British Columbia	4	0.23%
Montreal	Quebec	3	0%
Sinclair Mills	British Columbia	2	—N/a
Coaldale	Alberta	1	0.35%
Nanaimo	British Columbia	1	—N/a
Total Population	British Columbia	1,715	0.21%
Total Population	Canada	1,756	0.01%

It was in the 1950s that major immigration to Ontario would start to occur. The celebration of the birth of Guru Nanak was first celebrated in 1954 after a group of Sikhs from England arrived because of the liberalization of the laws due to the acts of the Khalsa Diwan Society. The construction of many gurdwaras had an immense effect on the Sikh population in Ontario. Following the founding of the East Indian Welfare Association by Sikhs, the first ever Sikh was elected to a city council in Mission, B.C. It was reported the following year that there were 2148 Sikhs in Canada.

==== Landmark political achievements ====
A significant event in Sikh-Canadian history occurred in 1950 when 25 years after settling in Canada and nine years after moving to British Columbia from Toronto, Naranjan "Giani" Singh Grewall became the first Sikh individual in Canada and North America to be elected to public office after successfully running for a position on the board of commissioners in Mission, BC against six other candidates. Grewall was re-elected to the board of commissioners in 1952 and by 1954, was elected to become mayor of Mission.

"Thank you all citizens of Mission City [...] It is a credit to this community to elect the first East Indian to public office in the history of our great dominion. It shows your broad-mindedness, tolerance and consideration.".

— Notice by Naranjan Singh Grewall in the local Mission newspaper following his election to public office, 1950

A millwright and union official, and known as a sportsman and humanitarian philanthropist as well as a lumberman, Grewall eventually established himself as one of the largest employers and most influential business leaders in the northern Fraser Valley, owned six sawmills and was active in community affairs serving on the boards or as chairman of a variety of organizations, and was instrumental in helping create Mission's municipal tree farm. With strong pro-labour beliefs despite his role as a mill-owner, after a scandal embroiled the provincial Ministry of Forestry under the-then Social Credit party government, he referred to holders of forest management licenses across British Columbia as Timber Maharajahs, and cautioned that within a decade, three or four giant corporations would predominantly control the entire industry in the province, echoing similarities to the archaic zamindar system in South Asia. He later ran unsuccessfully for the Co-operative Commonwealth Federation (the precursor of today's New Democratic Party) in the Dewdney riding in the provincial election of 1956.

While by the 1950s, Sikh-Canadians had gained respect in business in British Columbia primarily for their work in owning sawmills and aiding the development of the provincial forestry industry, racism still existed especially in the upper echelons of society. As such, during the campaign period and in the aftermath of running for MLA in 1956, Grewall received personal threats, while the six mills he owned along with his house were all set ablaze by arsonists. (Note: When Grewall was nominated as a candidate for the CCF party in the Dewdney riding in 1956, this drew excitement. But, according to Barrett, Grewall faced open discrimination on the campaign trail. “The former mayor knew the risk he was taking and many people were surprised he took this risk to enter the race,” said Barrett. Barrett said Grewall overcame many racial insults along the way. “Every kid in the North Fraser, who thinks he or she is being discriminated against, should read the Grewall story and the challenges he faced.” Grewall was later found dead in a Seattle motel room with a gunshot wound to the head in July of 1957. He was 47 years of age.) One year later, on July 17, 1957, while on a business trip, he was suspiciously found dead in a Seattle motel, having been shot in the head. (Note: After losing his MLA bid in 1956 to SoCred Labor Minister Lyle Wicks, Grewal began receiving threats. Fires were set at his mills and his house was set ablaze. On July 17, 1957, while on a business trip, Grewall was found dead in a Seattle motel. He had been shot in the head. Although local police ruled it a suicide, Grewall's family believes he was a victim of foul play. Grewall was survived by his wife and three children, who left Mission City shortly after his death. Despite the suspicious circumstances of his death, Grewall's story is more notable for his legacy of community involvement than for his untimely demise.) Grewall Street in Mission was named in his honour.

“Every kid in the North Fraser, who thinks he or she is being discriminated against, should read the Grewall story and the challenges he faced.”.

— Former B.C. premier Dave Barrett on Naranjan Singh Grewall

=== New era ===
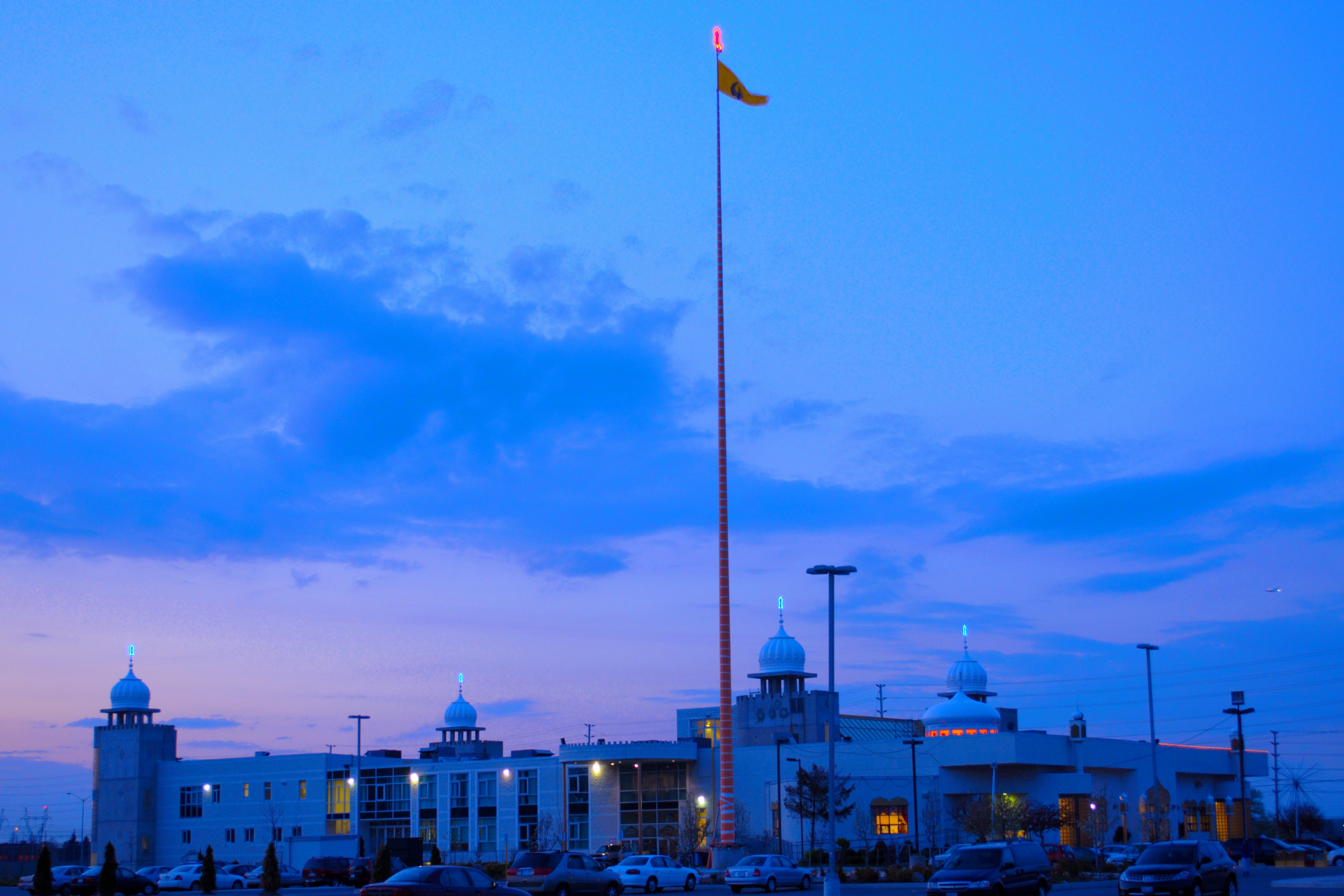
Khalsa Darbar Gurdwara, Ontario

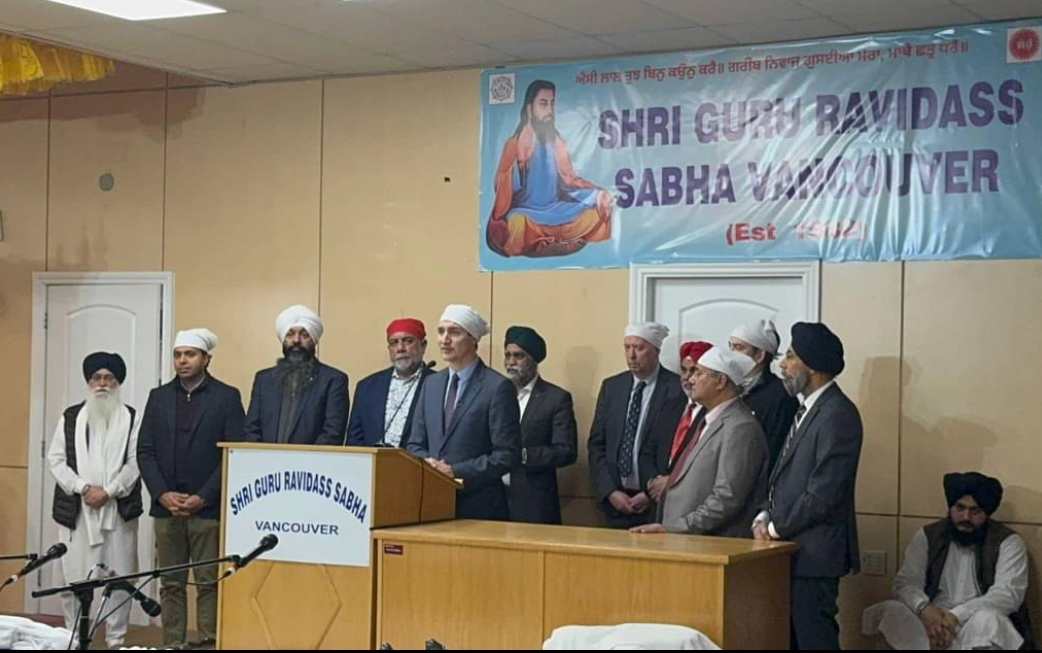
Canadian Prime Minister Justin Trudeau at Guru Ravidass Temple, Vancouver

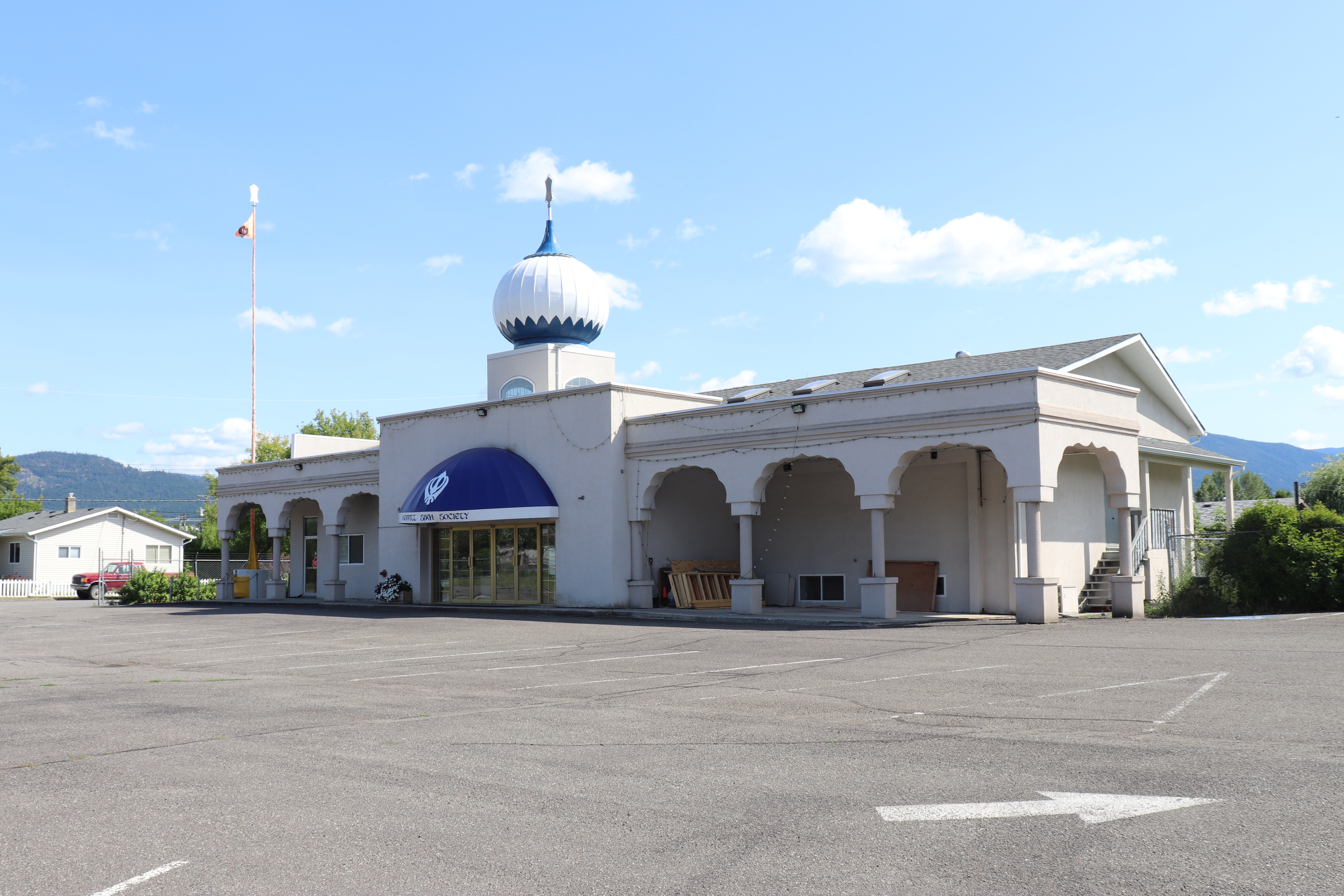
Small town Gurdwara in Merritt, British Columbia

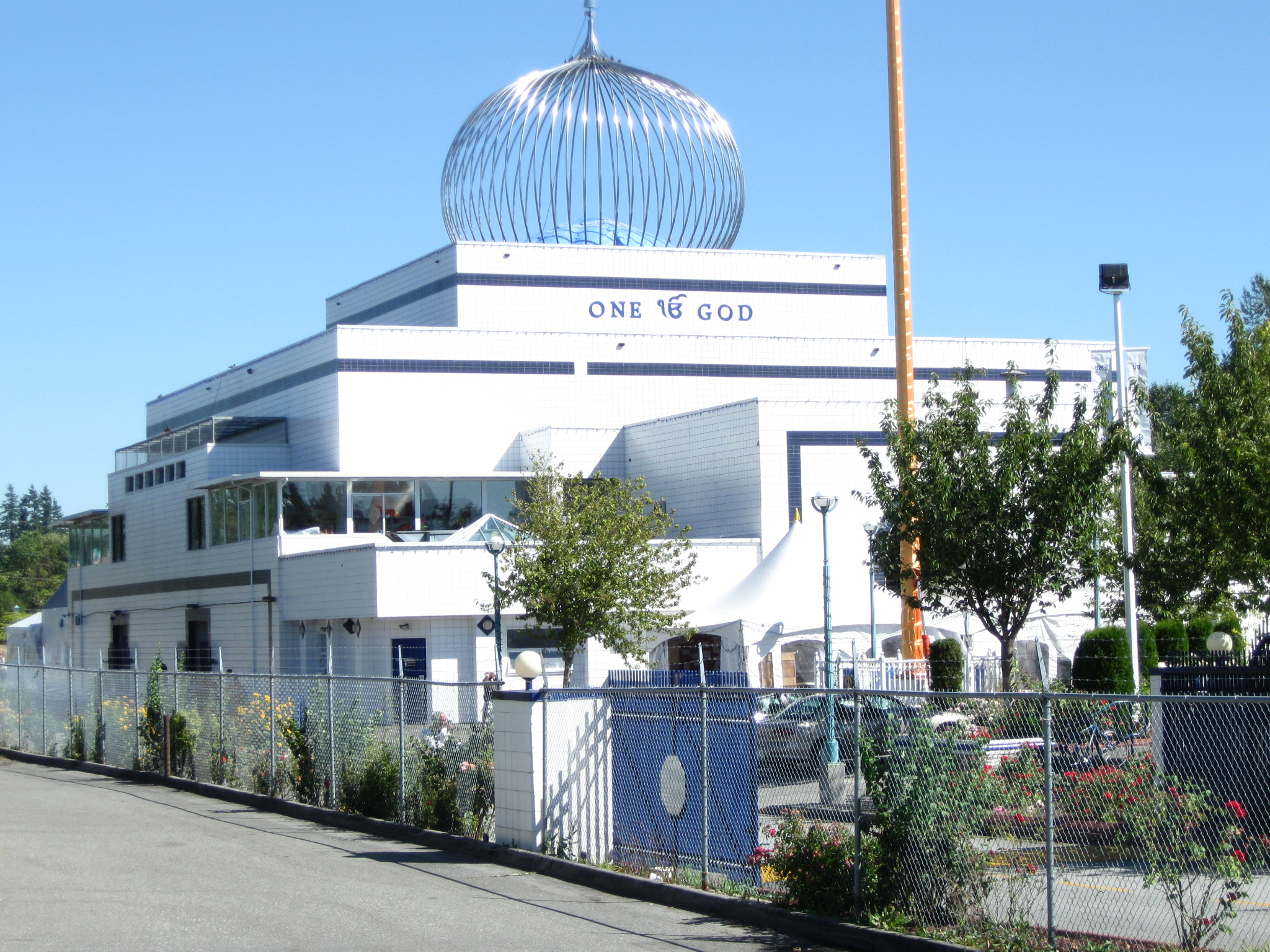
Guru Nanak Gurdwara, North Delta, British Columbia

In the 1960s and 1970s, tens of thousands of skilled Sikhs, some highly educated, settled across Canada, especially in the urban corridor from Toronto to Windsor. As their numbers grew, Sikhs established temporary gurdwaras in every major city eastward to Montréal, with the first gurdwara in Eastern Canada being made in 1965. These were followed in many instances by permanent gurdwaras and Sikh centres.

Most cities now have several gurdwaras, each reflecting slightly different religious views, social or political opinions. Through them, Sikhs now have access to a full set of public observances. Central among these are Sunday prayer services, and in many communities the prayers are followed by langar (a free meal) provided by members of the sangat (governing council of holy men) and the congregation. Near the end of the decade in 1979, the Canadian Sikhs, now more racially diverse, celebrated the 500th birthday of Guru Amar Das to mark the start of the annual Nagar Kirtan's, which would occur in Canada every year following. The Khalsa Diwan Society grew to a much larger amount during the immigration boom of this period. To celebrate the centennial birthday of the guru, the Khalsa Diwan Society purchased an adjoined building which included a school, museum, daycare and Gurdwara and named it after Guru Amar Das.

In the early 1980s, the Khalsa Diwan Society grew slightly more and built a sports complex. Canada would also have its first officially registered Sikh organization, the Federation of Sikh Societies of Canada in the early 1980s. In the months prior to Operation Blue Star, Sikh seats were granted to the University of British Columbia and the University of Toronto. The launching of Operation Bluestar enraged many Sikhs in Canada, who had left their homeland long ago in search of better prospects.

In 1986, following the British Columbia provincial election, Moe Sihota became the first Sikh-Canadian to be elected to provincial parliament. Sihota, who was born in Duncan, British Columbia in 1955, ran as the NDP Candidate in the riding of Esquimalt-Port Renfrew two years after being involved in municipal politics, as he was elected as an Alderman for the city of Esquimalt in 1984.

==== Civil unrest ====
In 1986, it was allowed by the Metro Toronto Police to have Sikhs wear turbans while on duty. Later that year, the Khalsa Credit Union was also established. In 1988, for the first time, the Canadian Parliament broached the topic of Operation Bluestar in regards to the Canadian Sikh population. In 1993, the Vancouver Punjabi Market was recognized as bilingual signs in English and Punjabi were established due to the high Sikh population in the area. In 1993, Sikhs were denied entry to the Royal Canadian Legion when invited to attend a Remembrance Day Parade. In 1995, the Canadian government officially recognized the Vaisakhi Nager Kirtan parade. Due to this, the civil unrest eventually began to fade as more and more cities outside of British Columbia and Ontario began to join in on the parades, including Montreal in 1998.

=== 2000s–present ===
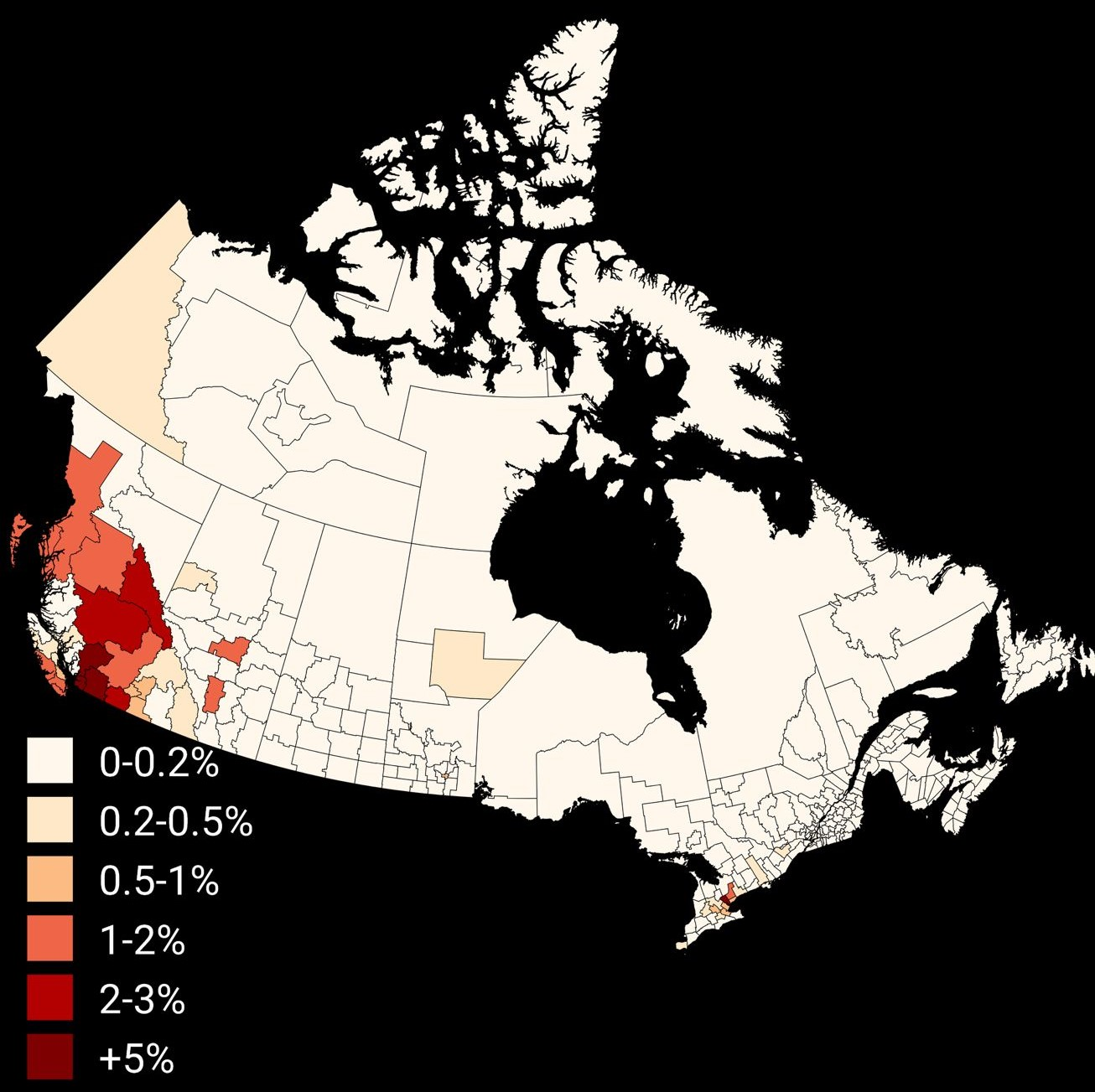
Population distribution of Sikh Canadians by census division, 2001 census

==== Centennial year ====
In 2002, the Gur Sikh Temple was designated a national historic landmark by Prime Minister Jean Chrétien on July 26, 2002. It is the only gurdwara declared a national historic landmark outside of South Asia. In 2007, the temple was completely renovated and reopened. In 2011, the Gur Sikh Temple in Abbotsford celebrated its one-hundredth birthday. To celebrate, the Government of Canada is funding the building of a museum dedicated to Canadian Sikhism. During the anniversary celebration, Prime Minister Stephen Harper gave a speech to the Punjabi Community as to how the Gur Sikh Temple is a shrine to all immigrants into Canada, not just Sikh ones. 2011 was declared the Centennial year for Canadian Sikhs.

Upon the announcement, many Canadian Sikhs, regardless of race, took up Nishan Sahib (the Sikh flag) and began to protest against the Indian government, and against the execution of Rajoana, in the city of Vancouver. Other protests happened worldwide in the United Kingdom, United States, Australia, New Zealand and even India itself. Following the release of Kishori Lal, a murderer who had decapitated three innocent Sikhs with a chopper knife, the announcement led Canadian Sikhs to believe that the Indian government was targeting Sikh people. In Canada, a large protest in Edmonton took place on March 25, six days prior to the pending execution. On the day before his impending execution, 5000 Sikhs walked in front of Parliament Hill in the capital city of Ottawa. That same day, an announcement was made that Rajoana's hanging would be stayed.

Many members of the Canadian Parliament supported the Sikh rallies and their protests against the death penalty in India. These politicians included, but were not limited to, Justin Trudeau, Parm Gill, Jasbir Sandhu, Wayne Marston, Don Davies, Kirsty Duncan and Jim Karygiannis. Around this time, a group of Skinheads called "Blood and Honour" would attack two Sikh men in Edmonton.

To celebrate the 2012 Vaisakhi festival, the local Sikh community decided to sponsor a new Canadian Army Cadet Corps, which was being formed by the Department of National Defence. Whilst happening on April 13 in 2012, Vaisakhi was celebrated in Vancouver on April 14. The Vancouver Sun made their estimation of the Metro Vancouver Sikh population to be at 200,000 during an article about the 2012 Vaisakhi. The Vancouver Vaisakhi ended up attracting thousands of people as well as various politicians including BC Premier Christy Clark. At the April 21 Surrey Vaisakhi, the Sikh peoples demonstrated support for Rajoana through various posters, with large banners calling India the world's largest democracy. The response to the support was positive.

Around this time, Sikh comedians Jasmeet Singh (JusReign), and Lilly Singh (Superwoman) would gain international fame for their videos on YouTube.

In May 2012, the classic Victoria Gurdwara, which was once broken down, but later rebuilt, would experience its one hundredth anniversary. It was the second Gurdwara to celebrate one hundred years in Canada after the Gur Sikh Temple in the Sikhs' Centennial Year. The Gurdwara houses over 3000 people per month. It was then announced that Sikhs would be allowed to wear kirpans in Toronto courthouses. In June, a Khalsa School in Brampton would be vandalized by racists who would put up signs of the Ku Klux Klan and with swastikas.

NDP Party Leader Thomas Mulcair would demand justice for the 1984 Anti-Sikh Pogroms. Mulcair would demand that a full investigation be put into the riots and those harmed be compensated. Soon after this statement, neo-Nazi gunman Wade Michael Page would commence a shooting at a Sikh Temple in Wisconsin, America, which would be described as a domestic terrorism act. Despite the fact that the shooting occurred outside of Canada, Canadian Sikhs would take full responsibility to spread the message of Sikhism, explain the religion, honour the dead and wounded as well as give their reactions to the shootings.

Stephen Harper pushed back at suggestions that Ottawa needs to do more about Sikh separatist activity in Canada, saying his government already keeps a sharp lookout for terrorist threats and that merely advocating for a Khalistan homeland in the Punjab is not a crime. Harper said violence and terrorism can't be confused with the right of Canadians to hold and promote their political views.

Following, on CKNW's Philip Till Show would feature Dave Foran, a man who would demand Canadian Sikhs to lose their religious aspects, namely turbans, beards, clothes and "waddling" while walking, claiming the features to make "real" Canadians "sick". Soon after, the Friends of the Sikh Cadet Corps would run into issues with the 3300 British Columbian Royal Army Cadet, over their choice of name. The resulting turmoil would put months and months of planning into disarray.

The Sikhs of Canada would once again take solidarity and hospitality, much like they had done with the Rajoana situation, to support Daljit Singh Bittu and Kulbir Singh Barapind. The two had previously been arrested and abused on false charges, resulting in their most recent arrest to raise the ire of the Canadian Sikhs, who would go on to trash the policing forces in Punjab.

==== New age ====
2013 was a monumental year for Sikhs as the April of that year was declared the Sikh Heritage Month by the Government of Ontario. In 2014, history was made when a park in Calgary was named after Harnam Singh Hari, the first Sikh settler who was able to successfully farm on fertile land in Alberta. This happened shortly after the announcement of Quebec's Charter of Values, which threatened the use of religious items at government workplaces. This Charter was opposed by the Sikhs, Hindus, Jews, Christians, and Muslims whose symbols would be affected by the charter. In May 2014, Lieutenant Colonel Harjit Sajjan became the first Sikh to command a Canadian regiment, ironically it was the British Columbia Regiment (Duke Connaught's Own), which opposed the Komagata Maru a century prior. In 2015, the Surrey Nagar Kirtan was declared the largest parade of its kind outside of India. In August 2015, Corporal Tej Singh Aujla of the 39th Brigade Group, Royal Westminster Regiment became the first Sikh soldier to guard and watch over the "Tomb of the Unknown Soldier" at Canada's National War Memorial. In regards to the 2015 Canadian election, it was internationally noted that in over twelve constituencies Sikh politicians were riding against each other, a highlight of the successful integration of the Sikh populace as Canadian citizens. It was also noted that of these politicians, Martin Singh was a Caucasian convert to Sikhism and potentially the first "white" Sikh to run for a constituency in the federal elections.

In the 2015 Canadian election, twenty Sikh MPs were elected, the most ever. Of these, four Sikh MPs went on to become a part of the Cabinet of Canada under Prime Minister Justin Trudeau. This marked the first time the Cabinet of Canada had more Sikhs as ministers than the Cabinet of India. This disparity was acknowledged by Trudeau in March 2016. Of these MPs, Bardish Chagger ended up becoming the first Sikh woman to hold a post in the Cabinet of the Prime Minister. Also, MP Lt. Col. (ret.) Harjit Singh Sajjan became the first Amritdhari Sikh to hold a Cabinet position since the Sikh Empire as Minister of National Defence. That same year, Punjabi became the third most spoken language of the Parliament of Canada. Concurrently, many Canadian Sikhs held solidarity with the protests of Sikhs in India following the sacrilege of the Guru Granth Sahib. Many Sikh organizations in Canada held discussions on how to address the situation in regards to Canada. Many Canadian Sikh youths took to Twitter to protest the sacrilege with the hashtag #SikhLivesMatter.

On April 11, 2016, Prime Minister Justin Trudeau announced that a formal apology for the Komagata Maru incident would finally be given after 102 years.

In 2016 Dr. Mohan Singh Virick, a Punjabi Sikh doctor who served Indigenous people in Cape Breton for 50 years, donated 140 hectares (335 acres) of land to Eskasoni First Nation. He also donated a building in Sydney to help house Eskasoni's growing population.

On October 1, 2017, Jagmeet Singh was elected leader of the federal New Democratic Party on the first ballot of that party's 2017 leadership race. Upon his election, Singh became the first Sikh and the first person of a visible minority group to be elected leader of a Canadian federal political party. Previously, Singh had also held the distinction of being the first turban-wearing Sikh to sit as a provincial legislator in Ontario. After the 2025 Canadian federal election, Singh announced that he would step down as party leader. In 2023, a diplomatic row occurred between Canada and India following the assassination of Hardeep Singh Nijjar.

The Punjabi edition of Hockey Night in Canada began in 2008 and ended in 2026.

=== Relations with indigenous peoples ===
In the early 20th century, Sikh and other Punjabi migrants to the West Coast of Canada referred to the indigenous peoples as Taae Ke (Punjabi term meaning "elder uncle's family" or "cousin"), a sign of respect and due to the early-migrants seeing similarities between themselves and the native peoples. Some of the early Sikh settlers saw the native peoples as "cousins". However, relations between the early Indian migrants and Aboriginal peoples deteriorated as the Indian community grew richer, leading them to disparage the Aboriginal people and the decline of the term. Despite this shift, some Sikh individuals and organizations continued to show solidarity with and support for the Aboriginal community, such as Sadhu Binning and Harsha Walia. Some Indian immigrant men married Aboriginal women in-order to obtain permanent residency and abandoned their Aboriginal wives afterwards.

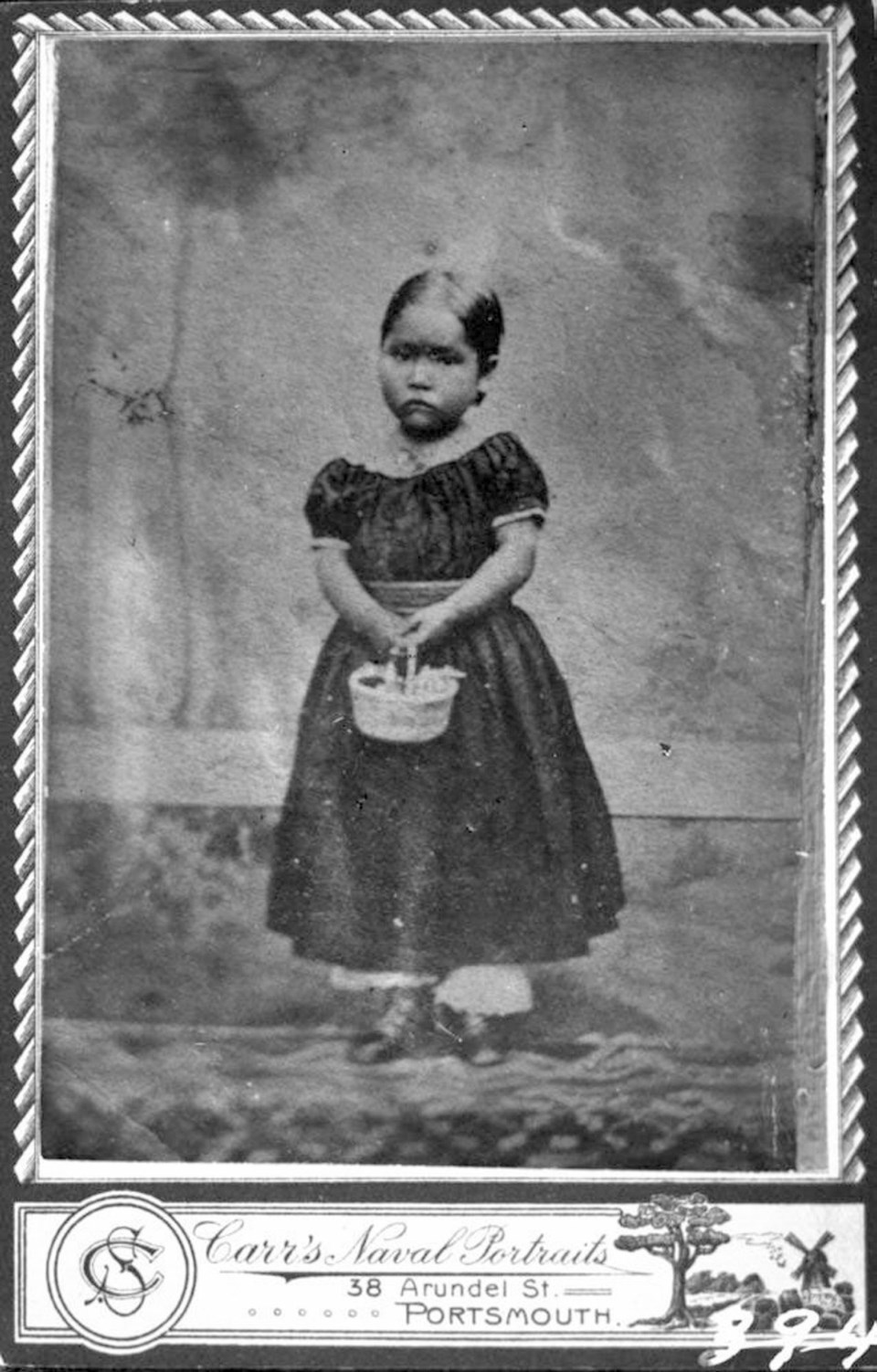
Photograph of "Maggie Sutlej", a kidnapped Ahousaht girl, ca.1864

There is a historical connection between Sikhs and the Ahousaht people due to the kidnapping of Maggie Sutlej, whom was named after the Sutlej river in Punjab, a river considered sacred by the Sikhs. In-remembrance, Khalsa Aid donated $200,000 to the Ahousaht First Nation in 2018 and hosted a gala event in Vancouver Island which was attended by both Sikhs and Ahousahts. During the Komagatu Maru incident, the Musqueam people helped the passengers to survive by paddling out in canoes to give them food and other supplies. However, the veracity of the story has been questioned by Ali Kazimi of York University, Hugh Johnston of Simon Fraser University, and Anne Murphy of the University of British Columbia, as the Komagatu Maru incident was heavily documented as a historical event and the tale does not find mention in official archives. However, Susan Roy and Naveen Girn affirm the tale's possibility of occurring, as it may derive from oral histories and was not captured in official records of the event. The story originates from early Sikh Canadian history recorded by Giani Kesar Singh, who interviewed people on-board at the time who recalled indigenous paddlers coming up to the boat, with the identify of the aboriginal nation that these paddlers belonged to being hypothized as being Musqueam due to the geographical region the event supposedly occurred but they may have also been Squamish or Tsleil-Waututh. A 4,000-square foot mural titled Taike-Sye’yə was painted on the side of the former Harry Stevens Federal Building in East Vancouver in 2019 to commemorate this.

== Demography ==
=== Population ===
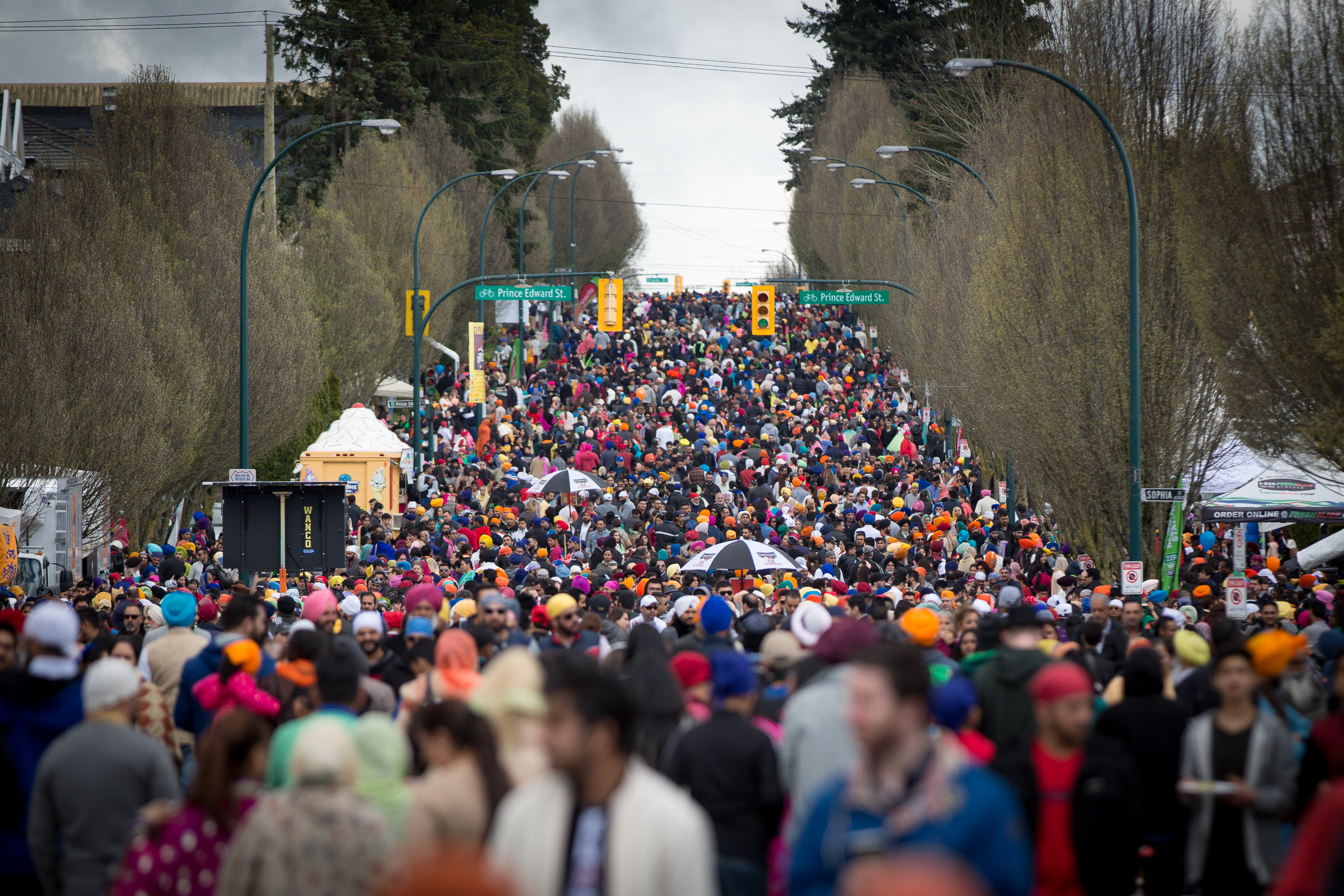
The 2017 Vaisakhi parade in the Punjabi Market neighbourhood of Vancouver, British Columbia

Unlike in South Asia and India, Sikhs have formed the main religious group among the South Asian Canadian, Indo-Canadian, and Punjabi Canadian communities from the onset of first settlement in the late 19th century into the present-day. In India, Sikhs comprise 1.72% of the population, while Hindus make up the largest religious group at close to 79.8%.

Until the 1950s, Sikhs formed up to 95% of the entire South Asian Canadian population, declining to 31.5% of the total South Asian Canadian population by 1981. The Sikh proportion among the South Asian Canadian community declined further to 29.7% in 2001; in the same year, Sikhs represented 34% of the total Indo-Canadian population. In 2021, Sikhs made up 29.6% of the total South Asian Canadian population, a slight increase over the 2011 proportion of 28.5%.

=== Generation status ===
Most Canadian Sikhs are immigrants.

Sikh Canadian generation status (2021)
Generation status	2021	
Generation status	Pop.	%
First generation	538,670	69.79%
Second generation	219,425	28.43%
Third generation or more	13,695	1.77%
Total	771,790	2.12%

=== Immigration status ===
The proportion of non-permanent residents amongst Sikhs in Canada has risen rapidly in recent years, primarily due to the surge in the number of Punjabi international students studying in Canadian colleges. Most of the students plan to eventually become citizens and permanent residents.

Sikh population in Canada by immigrant status (2001−2021)
Immigrant status	2021		2011		2001	
Immigrant status	Pop.	%	Pop.	%	Pop.	%
Non-immigrants (Note: Canadian citizens by birth.)	236,400	30.63%	162,670	35.75%	98,655	35.44%
Immigrants (Note: Naturalized Canadian citizens or Canadian permanent residents.)	415,465	53.83%	284,610	62.56%	176,045	63.23%
Non-permanent residents (Note: Persons from another country with a usual place of residence in Canada and who have a work or study permit or who have claimed refugee status.)	119,925	15.54%	7,685	1.69%	3,720	1.34%
Total	771,790	2.12%	454,965	1.38%	278,410	0.94%

=== Ethnicity ===
As of the 2021 Canadian census, there were 771,790 Sikh Canadians, forming 2.12% of the total population; the same census indicated that the vast majority (761,960 persons or 98.73%) of Sikh Canadians are of South Asian origin.

Sikh Canadian panethnic groups (2001−2021)
Panethnic group	2021		2011		2001	
Panethnic group	Pop.	%	Pop.	%	Pop.	%
South Asian	761,960	98.73%	447,330	98.32%	272,220	97.78%
Southeast Asian (Note: Statistic includes total responses of "Filipino" and "Southeast Asian".)	2,390	0.31%	2,805	0.62%	1,935	0.7%
European (Note: Statistic includes all persons that did not make up part of a visible minority or an indigenous identity.)	2,310	0.3%	1,545	0.34%	—N/a	—N/a
Middle Eastern (Note: Statistic includes total responses of "West Asian" and "Arab".)	515	0.07%	295	0.06%	360	0.13%
African	165	0.02%	220	0.05%	170	0.06%
Indigenous	160	0.02%	295	0.06%	—N/a	—N/a
East Asian (Note: Statistic includes total responses of "Chinese", "Korean", and "Japanese".)	105	0.01%	65	0.01%	350	0.13%
Latin American	35	0.005%	110	0.02%	25	0.01%
Other/multiracial	4,145	0.54%	2,285	0.5%	655	0.24%
Total	771,790	100%	454,965	100%	278,410	100%

=== Sex ratio ===
Sikh Canadian sex ratio (1921−2021)
Sex	2021		2011		2001		1981		1931 (Note: Includes Hindus.)		1921	
Sex	Pop.	%	Pop.	%	Pop.	%	Pop.	%	Pop.	%	Pop.	%
Male	394,345	51.09%	229,435	50.43%	141,115	50.69%	34,965	51.64%	956	81.5%	830	97.76%
Female	377,445	48.91%	225,530	49.57%	137,295	49.31%	32,745	48.36%	217	18.5%	19	2.24%
Total	771,790	2.12%	454,965	1.38%	278,410	0.94%	67,715	0.28%	1,173	0.01%	849	0.01%

=== Industry ===
Sikhs make up 2.35% of the Canadian workforce versus 2.12% of the general population. The largest proportion, 20.5%, of Sikh workers are employed in the "Transportation and warehousing" industry, making up 9.24% of the Canadian workforce in the industry and thus being the industry in which Sikhs are the most over-represented.

From the onset of early Sikh settlement to Canada beginning in 1897, into the 1900s, 1910s and onwards throughout the 20th century, the most common industry for Sikh Canadians was forestry, however many left the industry after it declined during the 1990s and 2000s. This resulted in a decline in Sikh populations in small sawmill-based towns throughout the British Columbia Interior and Vancouver Island like Fort St. James, Quesnel, Williams Lake, Merritt, Golden, Houston, Lillooet, Mackenzie, Terrace, Kitimat, Lake Cowichan, Tahsis, and Port Alberni. In contrast, the Sikh population of Greater Vancouver on the other hand continued to grow as Sikhs were able to shift away from forestry to other local industries.

Today, most Sikhs in British Columbia live in the Lower Mainland, with large populations in Surrey, North Delta, and West Abbotsford, and smaller, older enclaves in the Sunset neighbourhood of Vancouver (Punjabi Market) and the Queensborough neighbourhood of New Westminster. Outside of British Columbia, Sikh Canadians similarly primarily live in major metropolitan regions, where they are concentrated in the areas associated with transportation, warehousing, and manufacturing, such as Brampton, Caledon, Malton, and Rexdale in the Greater Toronto Area, Northeast Calgary and Chestermere, Southeast Edmonton, and Northwest Winnipeg.

In recent years, the number of Sikhs living on Canadian farms has grown, from 1,530 (0.14% of the total Canadian farm population) in 1981 to 3,440 in 2001 (0.47%) and 8,960 (1.52%) in 2021, with Sikhism being the second most common religion on Canadian farms. In 2021, 94.75% of the Sikh Canadian farm population was in British Columbia as opposed to 37.69% of the Sikh Canadian population overall, with Sikhs making up 15.48% of the provincial farm population, up from 5.26% in 2001 and 2.07% in 1981. The rise in the Sikh farm population is primarily associated with recent acquisition of vineyards and fruit orchards in the Okanagan around Oliver and Cawston by Sikhs, although Sikhs have long made an impact on agriculture in British Columbia as farm workers in the Fraser Valley, where they were responsible for starting the Canadian Farmworkers Union in 1978. In 1998, 97% of harvest workers in British Columbia were Punjabi-speaking. In 2004, British Columbia joined the Seasonal Agricultural Worker Program, which supplanted mostly Punjabi-speaking immigrants with temporary foreign workers, mostly from Mexico.

Sikh Canadian labor force (2001−2021)
Industry	2021		2001	
Industry	Pop.	% of industry workforce	Pop.	% of industry workforce
Agriculture, forestry, fishing and hunting	7,620	1.75%	8,370	1.47%
Mining, quarrying, and oil and gas extraction	945	0.4%	265	0.16%
Utilities	1,075	0.73%	290	0.24%
Construction	28,120	1.91%	3,925	0.45%
Manufacturing	38,195	2.48%	36,525	1.68%
Wholesale trade	11,420	1.87%	5,405	0.79%
Retail trade	56,050	2.61%	14,215	0.81%
Transportation and warehousing	90,670	9.24%	16,995	2.2%
Information and cultural industries	5,420	1.35%	2,460	0.59%
Finance and insurance	17,805	2.18%	4,735	0.74%
Real estate and rental and leasing	7,325	2.13%	1,745	0.67%
Professional, scientific and technical services	24,730	1.57%	5,135	0.52%
Management of companies and enterprises	635	1.4%	60	0.39%
Administrative and support, waste management and remediation services	26,520	3.35%	8,035	1.33%
Educational services	14,095	1%	3,195	0.31%
Health care and social assistance	41,145	1.68%	8,410	0.56%
Arts, entertainment and recreation	2,500	0.71%	790	0.26%
Accommodation and food services	43,130	3.97%	11,520	1.1%
Other services (except public administration)	13,130	1.65%	4,935	0.66%
Public administration	12,460	1.05%	3,620	0.4%
Total	443,000	2.35%	154,105	0.91%

=== Politics ===
Notable Sikh Canadian politicians include Harjit Sajjan, who became Canada's first non-White defense minister in 2015, Ujjal Dosanjh, who became the first non-White Premier of British Columbia in 2000, Bardish Chagger, the first female or non-White Leader of the Government in the House of Commons of Canada, Jagmeet Singh, who became the first non-White major party leader in Canadian history after winning the 2017 New Democratic Party leadership election, Tim Uppal, who has served as Deputy Opposition Leader since 2022, Jyoti Gondek, who became the first female mayor of Calgary in 2021, and Amarjeet Sohi, who became the first non-White mayor of Edmonton in 2021.

Moe Sihota was the first Sikh to be elected to provinical Parliament in 1986, while the first provinical Cabinet minister was Ujjal Dosanjh in 1995. Dosanjh would later become the first Sikh to lead a province in 2000. The first Sikh MPs, Jag Bhaduria, Gurbax Malhi, and Herb Dhaliwal, were elected in 1993, while the first Sikh Cabinet member, Herb Dhaliwal, was appointed Minister of National Revenue by Prime Minister Jean Chrétien in 1997. The first Sikh Senator was Sabi Marwah from Ontario, appointed in 2016.

There have been thirty-seven Sikh MPs, nine Sikh Cabinet members, and one Sikh Senator in Canadian history. (Note: Sikh MPs: Jag Bhaduria, Herb Dhaliwal, Gurbax Malhi, Gurmant Grewal, Navdeep Bains, Ruby Dhalla, Ujjal Dosanjh, Nina Grewal, Sukh Dhaliwal, Devinder Shory, Tim Uppal, Parm Gill, Bal Gosal, Jasbir Sandhu, Jinny Sims, Bardish Chagger, Anju Dhillon, Raj Grewal, Darshan Kang, Kamal Khera, Ruby Sahota, Raj Saini, Harjit Sajjan, Ramesh Sangha, Randeep Sarai, Bob Saroya, Jati Sidhu, Sonia Sidhu, Gagan Sikand, Amarjeet Sohi, Jagmeet Singh, Jasraj Hallan, Jag Sahota, Maninder Sidhu, Parm Bains, Iqwinder Gaheer, and George Chahal. Sikh Cabinet members: Herb Dhaliwal, Ujjal Dosanjh, Tim Uppal, Bal Gosal, Navdeep Bains, Bardish Chagger, Kamal Khera, Harjit Sajjan, and Amarjeet Sohi. Sikh Senators: Sabi Marwah.) Currently, there are zero Sikh Senators, fifteen Sikh MPs, and three Sikh Cabinet members; Sikhs make up 0% of the Senate, 4.44% of the House of Commons, and 7.69% of the Cabinet, while making up 2.12% of the Canadian population. Peak Sikh representation in the Cabinet and House of Commons occurred after the 2015 general election, when 18 Sikh MPs were elected (5.33% of the House of Commons) and four Sikh Cabinet ministers (11.43% of the Cabinet) were appointed by Prime Minister Justin Trudeau.

Of the fifteen incumbent Sikh MPs, six are from Ontario, five are from British Columbia, three are from Alberta, and one is from Quebec. Sikhs thus make up 11.9% of British Columbia's federal delegation, 8.82% of Alberta's federal delegation, 4.96% of Ontario's federal delegation, and 1.28% of Quebec's federal delegation, even as Sikhs only make up 5.92%, 2.48%, 2.14%, and 0.28% of their provincial populations respectively. Twelve incumbent Sikh MPs are from the Liberal Party while two are Conservatives and one is from the New Democratic Party.

A 2024 poll indicated that 54% of Canadian Sikhs would vote for Conservatives, 21% for Liberal, and 20% for the NDP in the next general election.

Sikh MPs (2021 Canadian general election)
Party	MP	Riding	Province	Sikh pop. share (%)	First elected	Notes
Liberal	Parm Bains	Steveston—Richmond East	British Columbia	5.2%	2021	
Liberal	Bardish Chagger	Waterloo	Ontario	1.22%	2015	Served as Minister of Small Business and Tourism from 2015 to 2018, Leader of the Government in the House of Commons of Canada from 2016 to 2019, and Minister of Diversity and Inclusion and Youth from 2019 to 2021.
Liberal	George Chahal	Calgary Skyview	Alberta	21.97%	2021	
Liberal	Sukh Dhaliwal	Surrey—Newton	British Columbia	51.47%	2015	Previously MP from 2006 to 2011.
Liberal	Anju Dhillon	Dorval—Lachine—LaSalle	Quebec	3.93%	2015	
Liberal	Iqwinder Gaheer	Mississauga—Malton	Ontario	12%	2021	
Conservative	Jasraj Hallan	Calgary Forest Lawn	Alberta	4.39%	2019	
Liberal	Kamal Khera	Brampton West	Ontario	24.4%	2015	Served as Minister of Seniors from 2021 to 2023 and as Minister of Diversity, Inclusion and Persons with Disabilities since 2023.
Liberal	Ruby Sahota	Brampton North	Ontario	25.59%	2015	Served as Chief government whip in 2024, before becoming Minister of Democratic Institutions and Minister responsible for the Federal Economic Development Agency for Southern Ontario.
Liberal	Harjit Sajjan	Vancouver South	British Columbia	9.98%	2015	Served as Minister of National Defense from 2015 to 2021, Minister of International Development from 2021 to 2023, Minister responsible for the Pacific Economic Development Agency of Canada since 2021, Minister of Emergency Preparedness since 2023, and President of the King's Privy Council for Canada since 2023.
Liberal	Randeep Sarai	Surrey Centre	British Columbia	27.74%	2015	
Liberal	Maninder Sidhu	Brampton East	Ontario	40.44%	2019	
Liberal	Sonia Sidhu	Brampton South	Ontario	21.91%	2015	
New Democrat	Jagmeet Singh	Burnaby South	British Columbia	2.79%	2019	Served as Leader of the New Democratic Party since 2017 to 2026.
Conservative	Tim Uppal	Edmonton Mill Woods	Alberta	19.17%	2019	Previously MP from 2008 to 2015. Served as Minister for Democratic Reform from 2011 to 2013 and has served as Deputy Leader of the Conservative Party and thus Deputy Leader of the Opposition since 2022.

== Geographical distribution ==
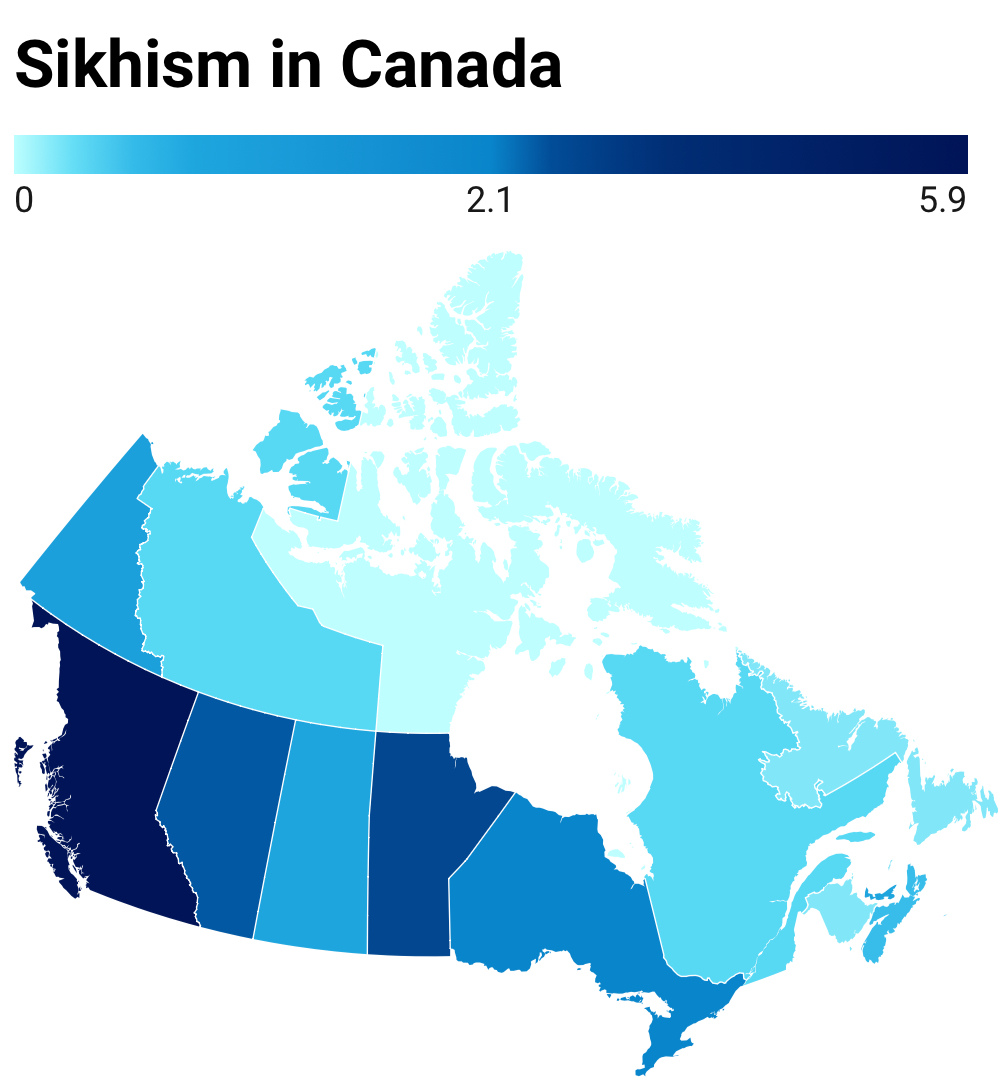
Sikh percent in Canada by province/territory, 2021 census

Prominent Sikh neighbourhoods exist in many of Canada's major cities, and their suburbs.

=== Provinces/territories ===
According to the 1981 Canadian census, 1991 Canadian census, 2001 Canadian census, the 2011 Canadian census, and the 2021 Canadian census, the number of Sikhs living in each of the Canadian provinces and territories is as shown in the following table. Additionally, the number of Sikh Canadians in 1944, as measured by a Khalsa Diwan Society survey, is also shown. Finally, the number of "Sikhs and Hindus" in the 1931, 1921, and 1911 censuses is shown, with most of these being Sikhs.

Sikh Canadians by province and territory (1911−2021)
Province/territory	2021		2011		2001		1991		1981		1944		1931		1921		1911	
Province/territory	Pop.	%	Pop.	%	Pop.	%	Pop.	%	Pop.	%	Pop.	%	Pop.	%	Pop.	%	Pop.	%
Ontario	300,435	2.14%	179,765	1.42%	104,785	0.93%	50,085	0.5%	16,645	0.2%	12	0%	2	0%	3	0%	1	0%
British Columbia	290,870	5.92%	201,110	4.65%	135,305	3.5%	74,545	2.3%	40,940	1.51%	1,715	0.21%	1,139	0.16%	819	0.16%	1,730	0.44%
Alberta	103,600	2.48%	52,335	1.47%	23,470	0.8%	13,550	0.54%	5,985	0.27%	17	0%	27	0%	10	0%	23	0.01%
Manitoba	35,470	2.71%	10,200	0.87%	5,485	0.5%	3,495	0.32%	1,685	0.17%	—N/a	—N/a	2	0%	3	0%	1	0%
Quebec	23,345	0.28%	9,275	0.12%	8,220	0.12%	4,525	0.07%	1,785	0.03%	3	0%	1	0%	11	0%	1	0%
Saskatchewan	9,035	0.82%	1,650	0.16%	500	0.05%	565	0.06%	220	0.02%	—N/a	—N/a	2	0%	3	0%	0	0%
Nova Scotia	4,730	0.49%	390	0.04%	270	0.03%	330	0.04%	275	0.03%	—N/a	—N/a	0	0%	0	0%	0	0%
New Brunswick	1,780	0.23%	20	0%	90	0.01%	45	0.01%	50	0.01%	—N/a	—N/a	0	0%	0	0%	0	0%
Prince Edward Island	1,165	0.77%	10	0.01%	0	0%	65	0.05%	0	0%	—N/a	—N/a	0	0%	0	0%	0	0%
Newfoundland and Labrador	850	0.17%	100	0.02%	130	0.03%	130	0.02%	65	0.01%	—N/a	—N/a	—N/a (Note: Newfoundland and Labrador did not become part of Canada until 1949.)	—N/a	—N/a	—N/a	—N/a	—N/a
Yukon	385	0.97%	90	0.27%	105	0.37%	40	0.14%	50	0.22%	—N/a	—N/a	0	0%	0	0%	2	0.02%
Northwest Territories	110	0.27%	20	0.05%	45	0.12%	60 (Note: Northwest Territories includes Nunavut, as the territory was not created until 1999.)	0.1%	10	0.02%	—N/a	—N/a	0	0%	0	0%	0	0%
Nunavut	10	0.03%	10	0.03%	10	0.04%	—N/a	—N/a	—N/a	—N/a	—N/a	—N/a	—N/a	—N/a	—N/a	—N/a	—N/a	—N/a
Canada	771,790	2.12%	454,965	1.38%	278,410	0.94%	147,440	0.55%	67,715	0.28%	1,756	0.01%	1,173	0.01%	849	0.01%	1,758	0.02%

==== British Columbia ====
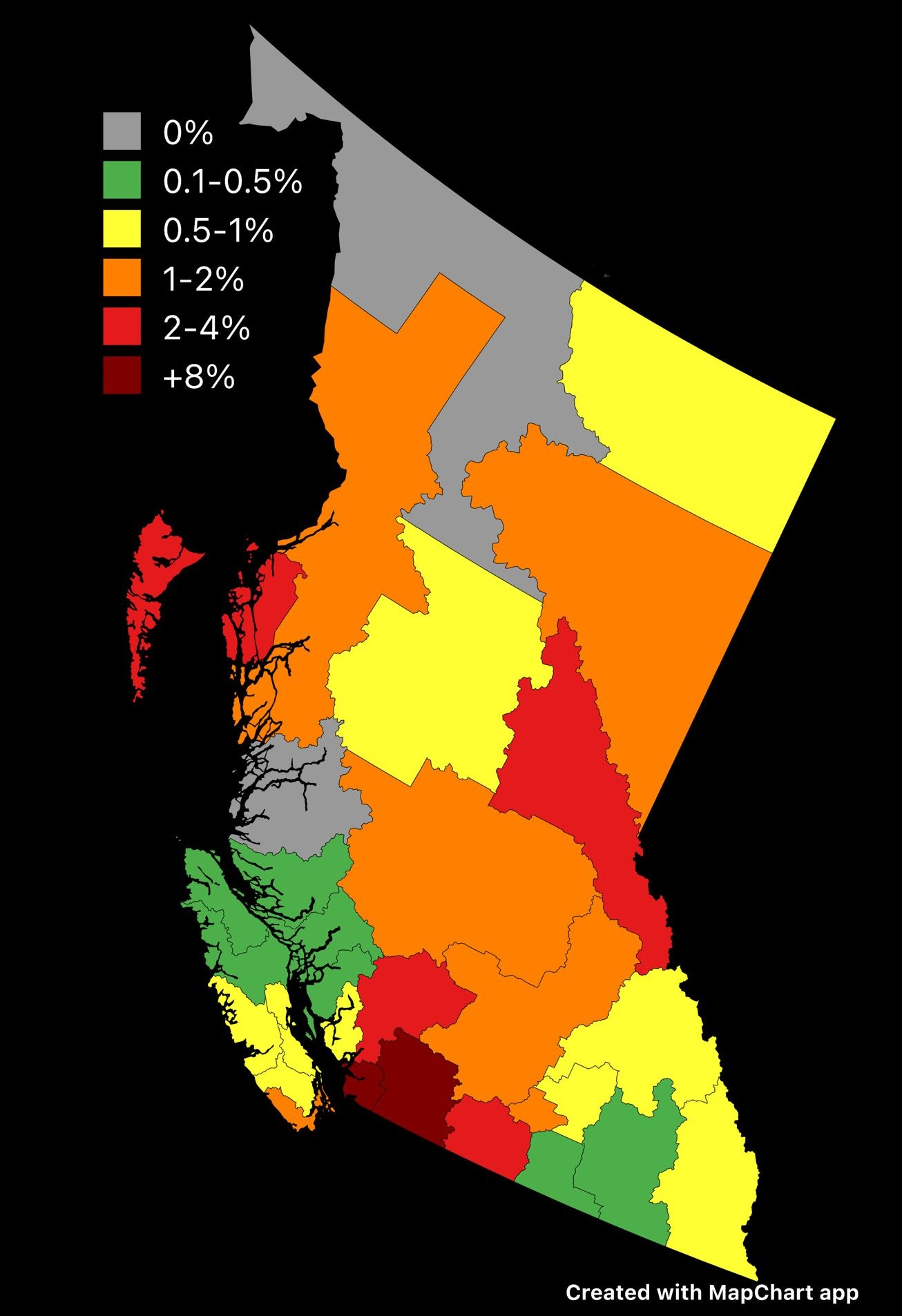
Population distribution of Sikh Canadians in British Columbia by census division, 2021 census

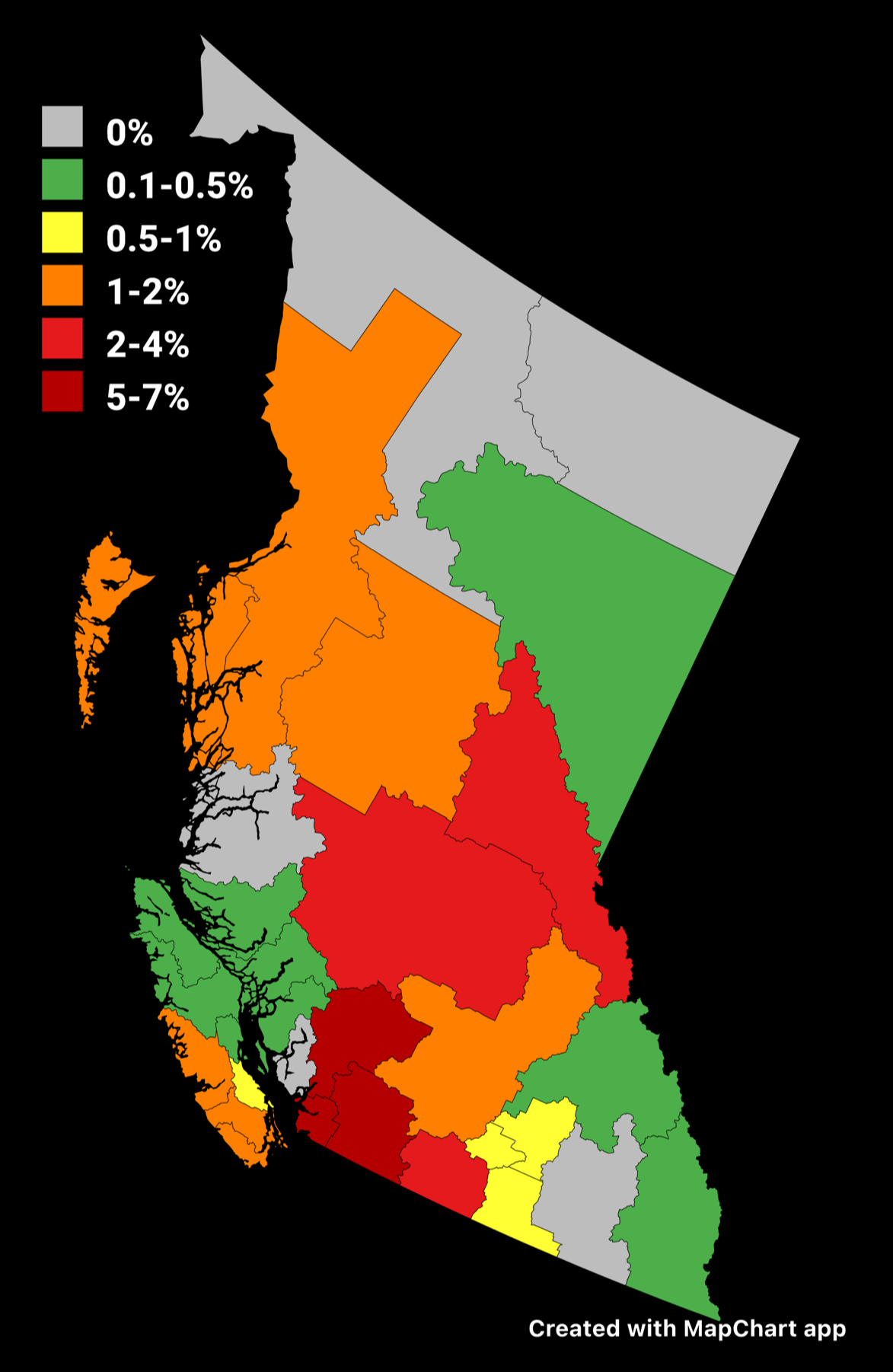
Population distribution of Sikh Canadians in British Columbia by census division, 2001 census

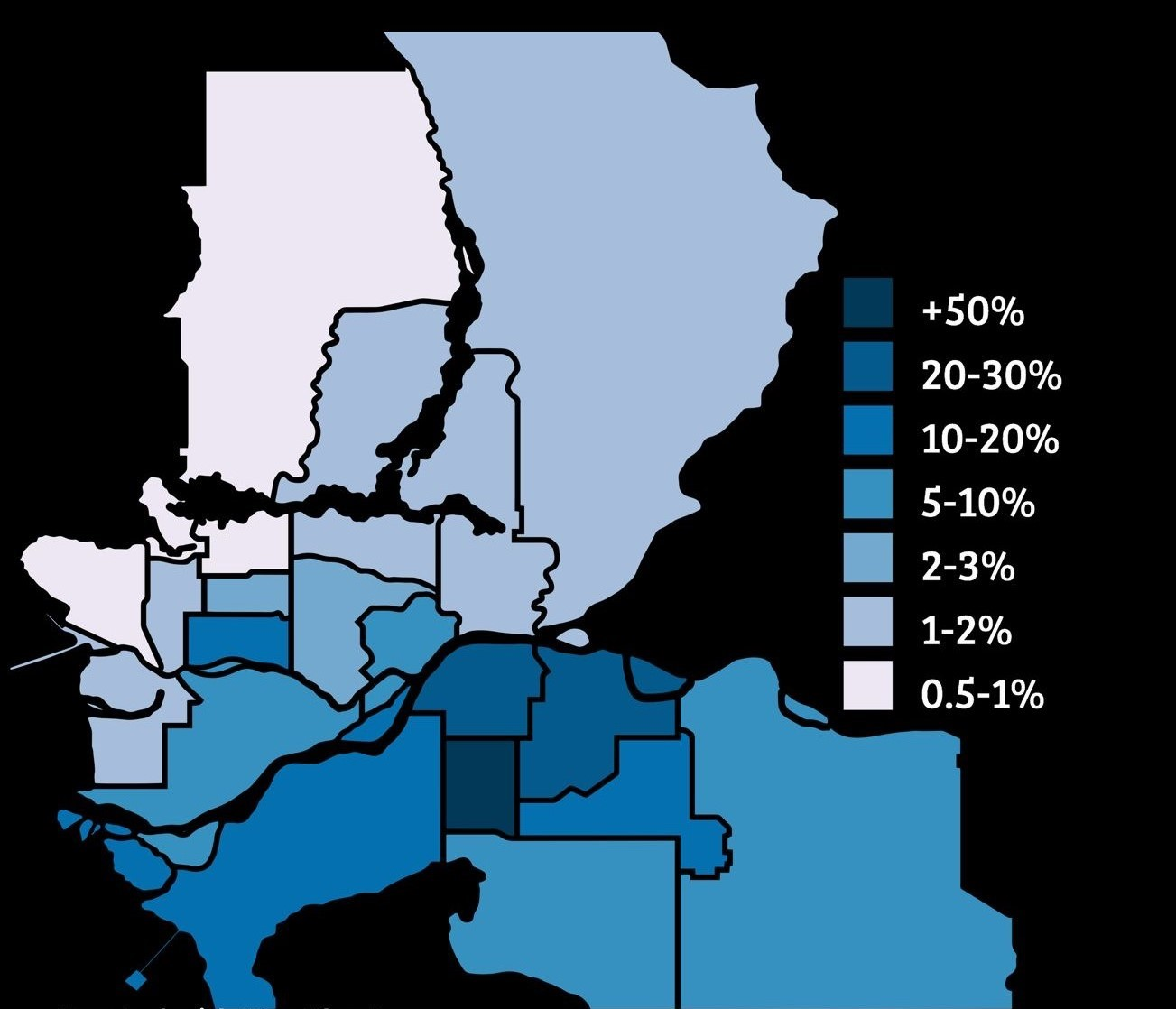
Population distribution of Sikh Canadians in Vancouver by federal electoral district, 2021 census

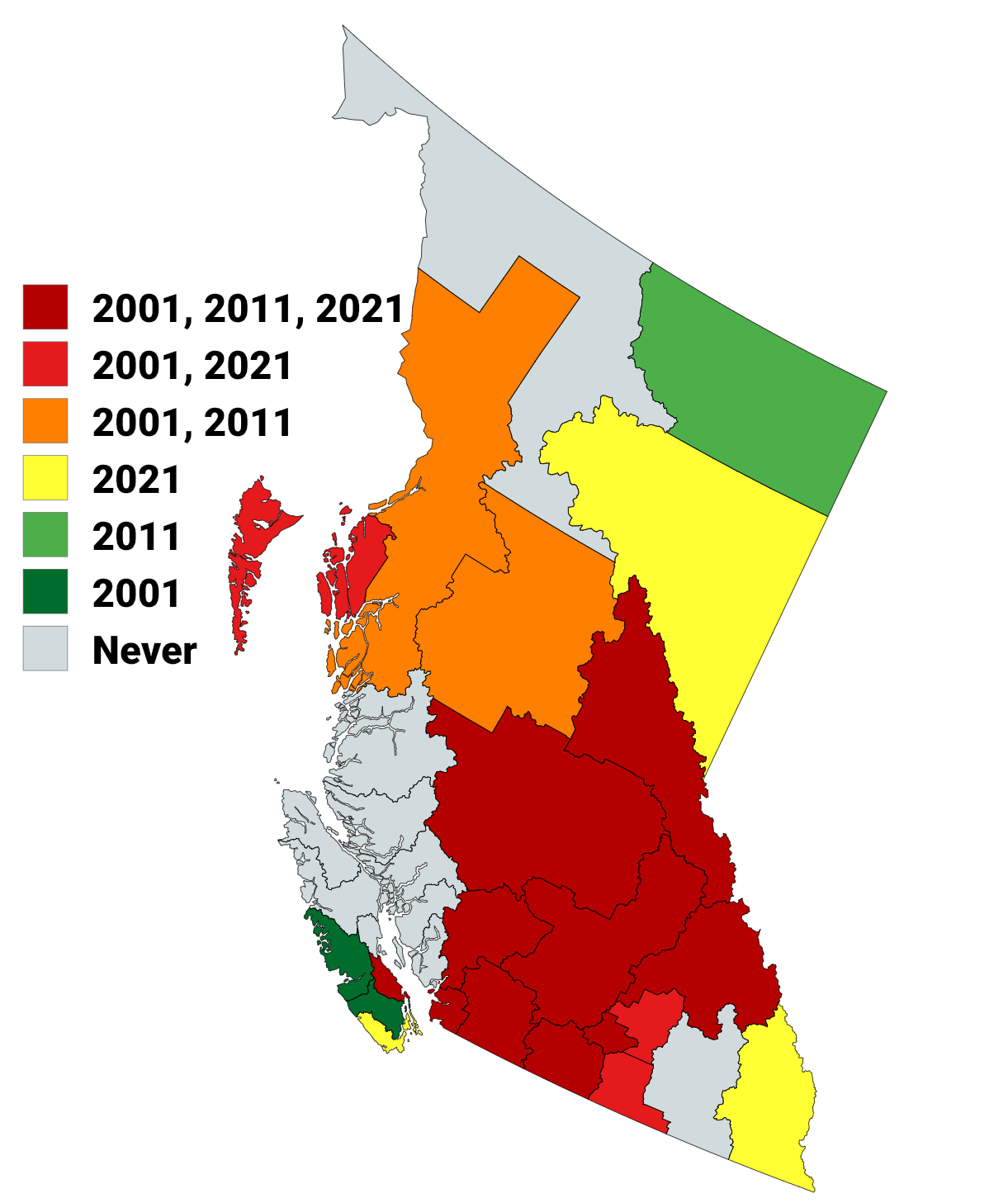
Regional districts of British Columbia where Sikhism was the largest non-Christian religion by census year (2001, 2011, 2021)

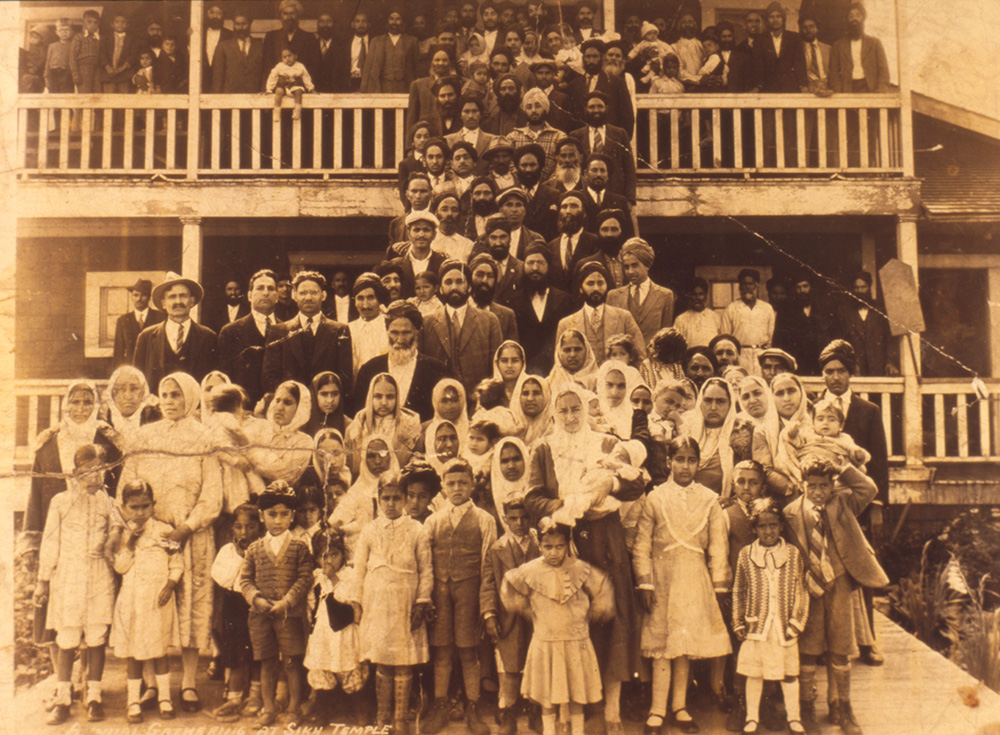
Sikh settlement in the Queensborough neighbourhood of New Westminster, 1931

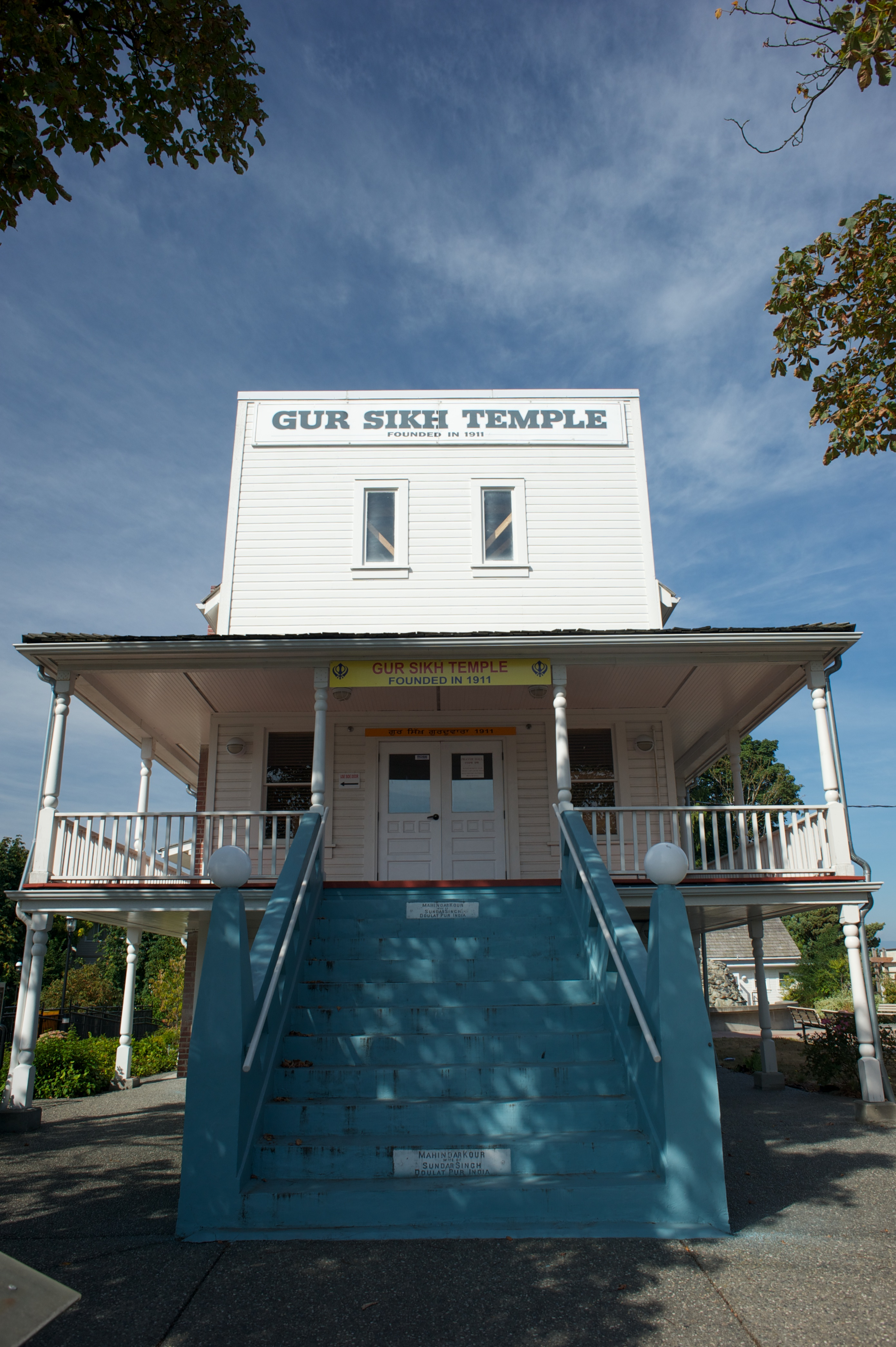
Gur Sikh Temple, Abbotsford

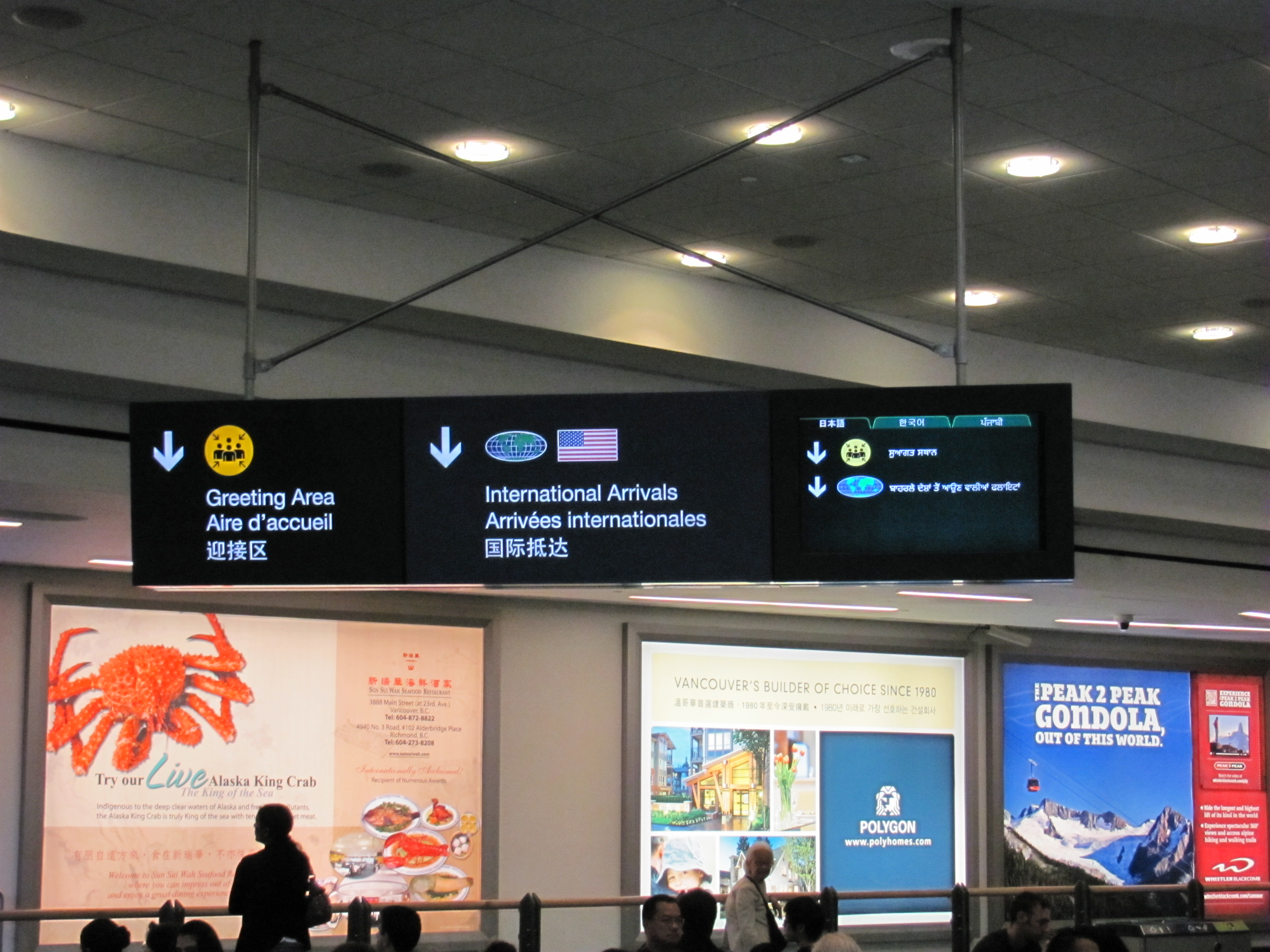
Gurmukhi language sign board at Vancouver International Airport

British Columbia is home to the highest proportion of Sikhs in the country and also most of the longest established Sikh communities. Although Sikhs can be found in most towns and cities within the province, the majority are concentrated in the Lower Mainland. Historically, the highest concentrations of Sikhs in British Columbia existed in rural regions throughout the province, including Vancouver Island, the interior, and the north.

The Gur Sikh Temple is located in Abbotsford. It is the oldest Sikh gurdwara building in North America that is still standing. In 1975 the Khalsa Diwan Society of Abbotsford separated from the parent organization in Vancouver, as the title of the Abbotsford gurdwara was transferred to the separated entity. The Abbotsford Sikhs wanted to have local control over their gurdwara.

Sikhism is the second largest religion in the Vancouver metropolitan area where they form 8.5% of the total population, according to the 2021 census.

In 2011 28,235 persons in the Abbotsford-Mission metropolitan area stated that they were of the Sikh religion, making up 16.9% of the population. Of all metropolitan areas in Canada, Abbotsford had the highest Sikh percentage in 2011. This was an increase over the 2001 census when 16,780 persons in the Abbotsford-Mission metropolitan area stated that they were of the Sikh religion.

Sikh Canadians by metropolitan areas in British Columbia (1981−2021)
Metropolitan area	2021		2011		2001		1991		1981	
Metropolitan area	Pop.	%	Pop.	%	Pop.	%	Pop.	%	Pop.	%
Vancouver CMA	222,165	8.52%	155,945	6.84%	99,005	5.03%	49,625	3.13%	22,390	1.79%
Abbotsford–Mission CMA	41,665	21.69%	28,235	16.94%	16,780	11.57%	6,525	5.86%	—N/a	—N/a
Victoria CMA	5,160	1.33%	3,645	1.08%	3,470	1.13%	2,990	1.05%	1,980	0.86%
Kelowna CMA	4,200	1.92%	1,875	1.06%	990	0.68%	600	0.54%	305	0.4%
Prince; George CA	2,415	2.75%	1,385	1.67%	1,825	2.16%	1,425	2.06%	1,050	1.56%
Kamloops CMA	2,070	1.87%	1,150	1.19%	1,395	1.62%	1,065	1.59%	1,095	1.71%
Chilliwack CMA	1,675	1.5%	455	0.5%	230	0.33%	150	0.25%	145 (Note: Note: 1981 census religious breakdown for all subdivisions and census agglomerations includes an "Eastern Non-Christian" section. Estimates derived using the Sikh proportion of Eastern Non-Christian religious total from the 1991 census.)	0.35%
Nanaimo CMA	1,355	1.21%	1,000	1.05%	985	1.17%	1,235	1.69%	850	1.48%
Squamish CA	1,260	5.26%	910	5.28%	1,580	10.99%	—N/a	—N/a	—N/a	—N/a
Penticton CA	780	1.69%	640	1.55%	660	1.6%	285	0.64%	—N/a	—N/a
Fort St. John CA	485	1.71%	55	0.21%	10	0.06%	60	0.43%	—N/a	—N/a
Vernon CA	485	0.74%	290	0.51%	505	0.99%	335	0.71%	220	0.53%
Duncan CA	430	0.93%	645	1.53%	840	2.2%	880	3.26%	—N/a	—N/a
Prince Rupert CA	410	3.08%	290	2.21%	415	2.73%	365	1.99%	370	2.02%
Terrace CA	390	2%	270	1.76%	345	1.74%	610	3.24%	895	2.77%
Williams Lake CA	340	1.46%	365	1.99%	845	3.4%	1,145	3.32%	—N/a	—N/a
Courtenay CA	215	0.35%	15	0.03%	10	0.02%	15	0.03%	25	0.07%
Port Alberni CA	215	0.85%	280	1.12%	435	1.73%	735	2.78%	900	2.77%
Dawson Creek CA	205	1.18%	0	0%	30	0.17%	0	0%	—N/a	—N/a
Campbell River CA	200	0.5%	40	0.11%	370	1.1%	250	0.81%	—N/a	—N/a
Quesnel CA	185	0.81%	360	1.65%	720	2.97%	1,000	4.31%	—N/a	—N/a
Cranbrook CA	155	0.59%	0	0%	20	0.08%	35	0.22%	—N/a	—N/a
Salmon Arm CA	105	0.56%	15	0.09%	—N/a	—N/a	—N/a	—N/a	—N/a	—N/a
Trail CA	100	0.72%	—N/a	—N/a	—N/a	—N/a	—N/a	—N/a	65	0.29%
Nelson CA	75	0.4%	—N/a	—N/a	—N/a	—N/a	—N/a	—N/a	—N/a	—N/a
Ladysmith CA	40	0.26%	—N/a	—N/a	—N/a	—N/a	—N/a	—N/a	—N/a	—N/a
Parksville CA	40	0.13%	10	0.04%	65	0.27%	—N/a	—N/a	—N/a	—N/a
Powell River CA	40	0.23%	0	0%	10	0.06%	65	0.36%	70	0.36%
Kitimat CA	—N/a	—N/a	—N/a	—N/a	330	3.22%	505	4.48%	—N/a	—N/a

According to the 1991 census, subdivisions in British Columbia with the highest proportions of Sikhs included Fort St. James (21.6%), Quesnel (12.0%), Williams Lake (10.1%), Merritt (9.7%), Surrey (8.6%), Tahsis (8.3%), Golden (8.1%), Houston (7.0%), Abbotsford (6.2%), Lillooet (6.0%), Squamish (5.6%), and Terrace (5.4%).

Subdivisions with the highest proportions of Sikhs in British Columbia as per the 2001 census included Surrey (16.3%), Okanagan-Similkameen Subdivision C (Note: Rural region surrounding Oliver.) (15.1%), Abbotsford (13.4%), Squamish (11.2%), Cawston (10.6%), Fort St. James (10.3%), Delta (8.6%), Okanagan-Similkameen Subdivision A (Note: Rural region surrounding Osoyoos.) (8.3%), Merritt (8.0%), Williams Lake (7.6%), Mackenzie (7.1%), Quesnel (7.1%), Houston (7.0%), Mission (5.1%), and New Westminster (5.1%).

According to the 2011 census, subdivisions in British Columbia with the highest proportions of Sikhs included Surrey (22.6%), Abbotsford (20.0%), Okanagan-Similkameen Subdivision A (16.9%), Okanagan-Similkameen Subdivision C (15.7%), Delta (10.6%), Cawston (10.1%), Mission (5.9%), Okanagan-Similkameen Subdivision G (Note: Rural region surrounding Keremeos.) (5.8%), Osoyoos (5.6%), Squamish (5.4%), and Oliver (5.2%).

The city of Surrey, a suburb situated in the southeastern sector of the Metro Vancouver metropolitan area and the Metro Vancouver regional district, has the highest proportion of Sikhs in a subdivision in British Columbia, forming 27.5% of the population, as per the 2021 census. Within the city, Sikhs form a majority in the Newton and Whalley neighbourhoods. Surrey's Sikhs can be found in large numbers across the city, with the exception of South Surrey.

The city of Abbotsford, an exurb situated in the southwestern area of the Abbotsford-Mission metropolitan area and the Fraser Valley regional district, has the next-largest concentration of Sikhs in a subdivision in British Columbia, at 25.5% of the population, as per the 2021 census. According to the 2011 census, 16.3% of persons in Abbotsford self-identified as East Indian, and 2.3% as Punjabi. The west side of the city of Abbotsford specifically hosts a large Sikh community, forming over 60% of the population in some parts of the Clearbook and Townline Hill areas. Similar to New Westminster, the establishment of Abbotsford's Sikh community goes back generations to 1905.

Following Surrey (27.5%) and Abbotsford (25.5%), subdivisions in British Columbia with the highest proportions of Sikhs as per the 2021 census included Delta (17.9%), Cawston (16.3%), Okanagan-Similkameen Subdivision A (15.9%), Okanagan-Similkameen Subdivision C (14.3%), Mission (8.1%), McBride (8.0%), Oliver (7.6%), Squamish (5.4%), 100 Mile House (5.3%), and New Westminster (4.8%).

In the city of Vancouver, Sikhs form over 30% of the population in the Sunset neighbourhood, with the traditional Punjabi Market being the epicentre of Vancouver's Sikh community.

Sikhs in the city of New Westminster can be found in the Queensborough area, where they are upwards of 30% of the population, and have lived since 1919.

The southern half of Oliver, BC, a small town in the Okanagan Valley, also has a Sikh population above 40%.

Sikh Canadians by subdivisions in British Columbia (1981−2021)
Subdivision	Regional district	Percentage				
Subdivision	Regional district	2021	2011	2001	1991	1981
Surrey	Metro Vancouver	27.45%	22.6%	16.29%	8.59%	2.7%
Abbotsford	Fraser Valley	25.46%	19.97%	13.38%	6.22%	3.33%
Delta	Metro Vancouver	17.93%	10.63%	8.57%	4.18%	2.11%
Cawston	Okanagan–Similkameen	16.36%	10.13%	10.62%	4.41% (Note: Okanagan-Similkameen Subdivision B, including Cawston and surrounding areas)	0.82%
Okanagan-Similkameen; Subdivision A	Okanagan–Similkameen	15.87%	16.89%	8.33%	0.26%	0.56%
Okanagan-Similkameen; Subdivision C	Okanagan–Similkameen	14.34%	15.68%	15.08%	0.56%	0%
Mission	Fraser Valley	8.06%	5.89%	5.1%	4.79%	3.79%
McBride	Fraser–Fort George	8.04%	0%	0%	0%	0%
Oliver	Okanagan–Similkameen	7.56%	5.21%	4.48%	0.55%	0.9%
Squamish	Squamish–Lillooet	5.35%	5.38%	11.18%	5.62%	4.75%
100 Mile House	Cariboo	5.32%	0.84%	1.49%	3.71%	6.37%
New Westminster	Metro Vancouver	4.8%	4.49%	5.05%	2.4%	2.07%
Okanagan-Similkameen; Subdivision G	Okanagan–Similkameen	4.58%	5.84%	1.96%	4.12%	—N/a
White Rock	Metro Vancouver	4.37%	0.46%	0.2%	0.42%	0.65%
Osoyoos	Okanagan–Similkameen	4.27%	5.57%	0.59%	0.89%	0.38%
Langley (District)	Metro Vancouver	3.95%	1.91%	1.22%	0.46%	0.72%
Langley (City)	Metro Vancouver	3.73%	0.14%	0.21%	0.64%	0.34%
Prince Rupert	North Coast	3.41%	2.39%	2.86%	2.23%	2.33%
Pitt Meadows	Metro Vancouver	3.36%	3.16%	4.57%	3.32%	1.85%
Richmond	Metro Vancouver	3.35%	3.78%	3.52%	3.57%	2.38%
Terrace	Kitimat–Stikine	3.3%	2.34%	2.91%	5.43%	3.99%
Prince George	Fraser–Fort George	3.2%	1.96%	2.53%	2.06%	1.77%
Williams Lake	Cariboo	2.99%	3.49%	7.66%	10.08%	10.45%
Golden	Columbia-Shuswap	2.95%	3.13%	4.28%	8.13%	5.54%
Saanich	Capital	2.81%	2.21%	2.51%	2.17%	1.46%
Burnaby	Metro Vancouver	2.81%	2.9%	2.94%	2.15%	1.51%
Merritt	Thompson–Nicola	2.74%	3.84%	8.03%	9.65%	10.35%
Kelowna	Central Okanagan	2.59%	1.33%	0.9%	0.66%	0.52%
Vancouver	Metro Vancouver	2.54%	2.85%	2.82%	2.78%	2.46%
Fort St. John	Peace River	2.31%	0.3%	—N/a	0.43%	0.76%
Port Coquitlam	Metro Vancouver	2.21%	2.26%	1.58%	1.63%	1.03%
Maple Ridge	Metro Vancouver	2.14%	1.16%	1.11%	0.81%	0.52%
Kamloops	Thompson–Nicola	2.12%	1.37%	1.74%	1.61%	1.87%
Penticton	Okanagan–Similkameen	2.1%	1.75%	2.08%	0.95%	0.59%
Quesnel	Cariboo	1.91%	3.61%	7.06%	12.04%	13.89%
Smithers	Bulkley–Nechako	1.81%	—N/a	—N/a	0%	0%
Chilliwack	Fraser Valley	1.71%	0.58%	0.37%	0.31%	0.41%
Dawson Creek	Peace River	1.7%	0.62%	0.19%	0%	0%
Central Saanich	Capital	1.57%	0.54%	0.49%	0.3%	0%
View Royal	Capital	1.51%	2.7%	2.34%	2.7%	—N/a
Fort St. James	Bulkley Nechako	1.5%	3.07%	10.31%	21.59%	15.66%
Houston	Bulkley-Nechako	1.49%	4.94%	6.98%	7.02%	5.48%
Castlegar	Central Kootenay	1.43%	—N/a	0.15%	0.23%	0.44%
Sechelt	Sunshine Coast	1.41%	—N/a	—N/a	0%	0%
Nanaimo	Nanaimo	1.37%	1.08%	1.32%	1.92%	1.95%
Langford	Capital	1.3%	1.5%	1.29%	0.67%	0.73%
Coquitlam	Metro Vancouver	1.26%	1.14%	0.88%	0.76%	0.56%
Trail	Kootenay Boundary	1.25%	—N/a	1.23%	0.19%	0.21%
North Saanich	Capital	1.23%	0.41%	0.19%	0.31%	0.49%
North Cowichan	Cowichan Valley	1.23%	2.16%	3%	3.51%	3.8%
Port Alberni	Alberni–Clayoquot	1.2%	1.52%	2.42%	3.97%	4.33%
Lake Country	Central Okanagan	1.09%	0.75%	0.65%	0.25%	0.13%
Summerland	Okanagan–Similkameen	1.07%	0.18%	0.38%	0.22%	0.2%
Port Hardy	Mount Waddington	1.04%	—N/a	—N/a	0.89%	0.88%
North Vancouver (City)	Metro Vancouver	0.92%	0.79%	0.6%	0.89%	0.45%
Cranbrook	East Kootenay	0.78%	0.19%	0.11%	0.22%	0.57%
Vernon	North Okanagan	0.78%	0.48%	1.29%	1.28%	0.89%
Lake Cowichan	Cowichan Valley	0.75%	2.2%	2.47%	4.02%	8.62%
Oak Bay	Capital	0.68%	0.49%	0.2%	0.43%	0.12%
West Kelowna	Central Okanagan	0.66%	0.8%	0.24%	0.37%	0.47%
Nelson	Central Kootenay	0.65%	0.1%	0.16%	0.12%	0.11%
Duncan	Cowichan Valley	0.65%	0.56%	1.46%	3.21%	1.56%
North; Vancouver (District)	Metro Vancouver	0.63%	0.51%	0.49%	0.4%	0.29%
Courtenay	Comox Valley	0.61%	0.04%	0.06%	0.04%	0.06%
Campbell River	Strathcona	0.57%	0.13%	1.25%	1.19%	2.39%
Fernie	East Kootenay	0.57%	—N/a	0.66%	0.61%	1.02%
Salmon Arm	Columbia–Shuswap	0.54%	0.12%	0.07%	0.17%	0.32%
Victoria	Capital	0.48%	0.41%	0.42%	0.52%	0.5%
West Vancouver	Metro Vancouver	0.31%	0.27%	0.29%	0.04%	0.03%
Kitimat	Kitimat–Stikine	0.24%	0.66%	3.27%	4.48%	3.1%
Port Moody	Metro Vancouver	0.24%	0.55%	0.08%	0.37%	0.3%
Lillooet	Squamish-Lillooet	—N/a	0.86%	2.39%	6%	7.28%
Mackenzie	Fraser-Fort George	—N/a	0.42%	7.07%	4.58%	4.24%
Elkford	East Kootenay	—N/a	0.4%	1.36%	2.74%	3.22%
Tahsis	Strathcona	—N/a	1.56%	2.5%	8.29%	10.34%
Thompson-Nicola; Subdivision A (Note: Rural region including and surrounding Clearwater-Vavenby.)	Thompson–Nicola	—N/a	—N/a	1.59%	3.54%	3.88%
Sparwood	East Kootenay	—N/a	—N/a	0.92%	3.39%	3.48%
Montrose	Kootenay-Boundary	—N/a	—N/a	1.41%	2.45%	0.82%
Port McNeill	Mount Waddington	—N/a	—N/a	—N/a	1.68%	1.84%

==== Prairies ====
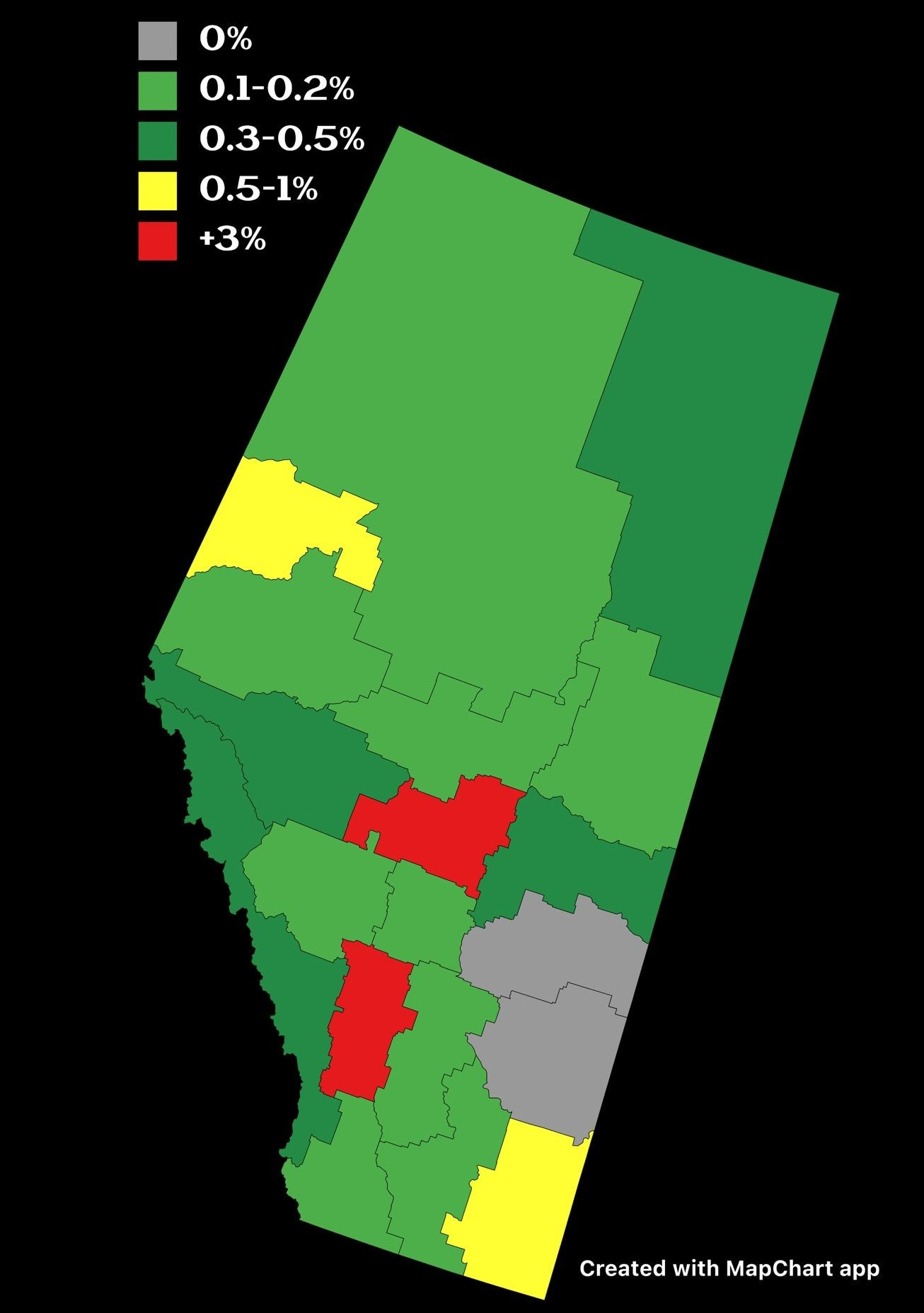
Population distribution of Sikh Canadians in Alberta by census division, 2021 census

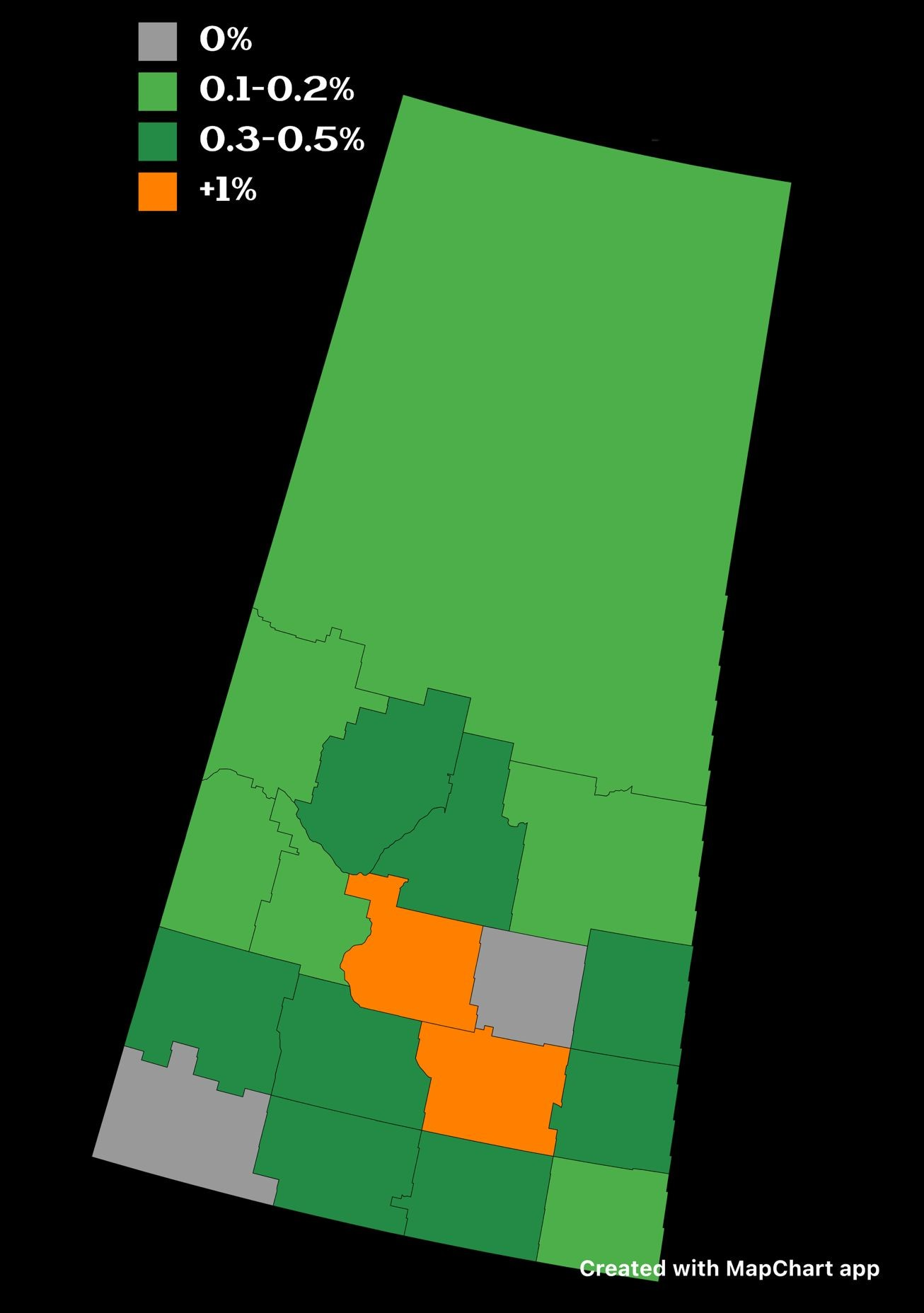
Population distribution of Sikh Canadians in Saskatchewan by census division, 2021 census

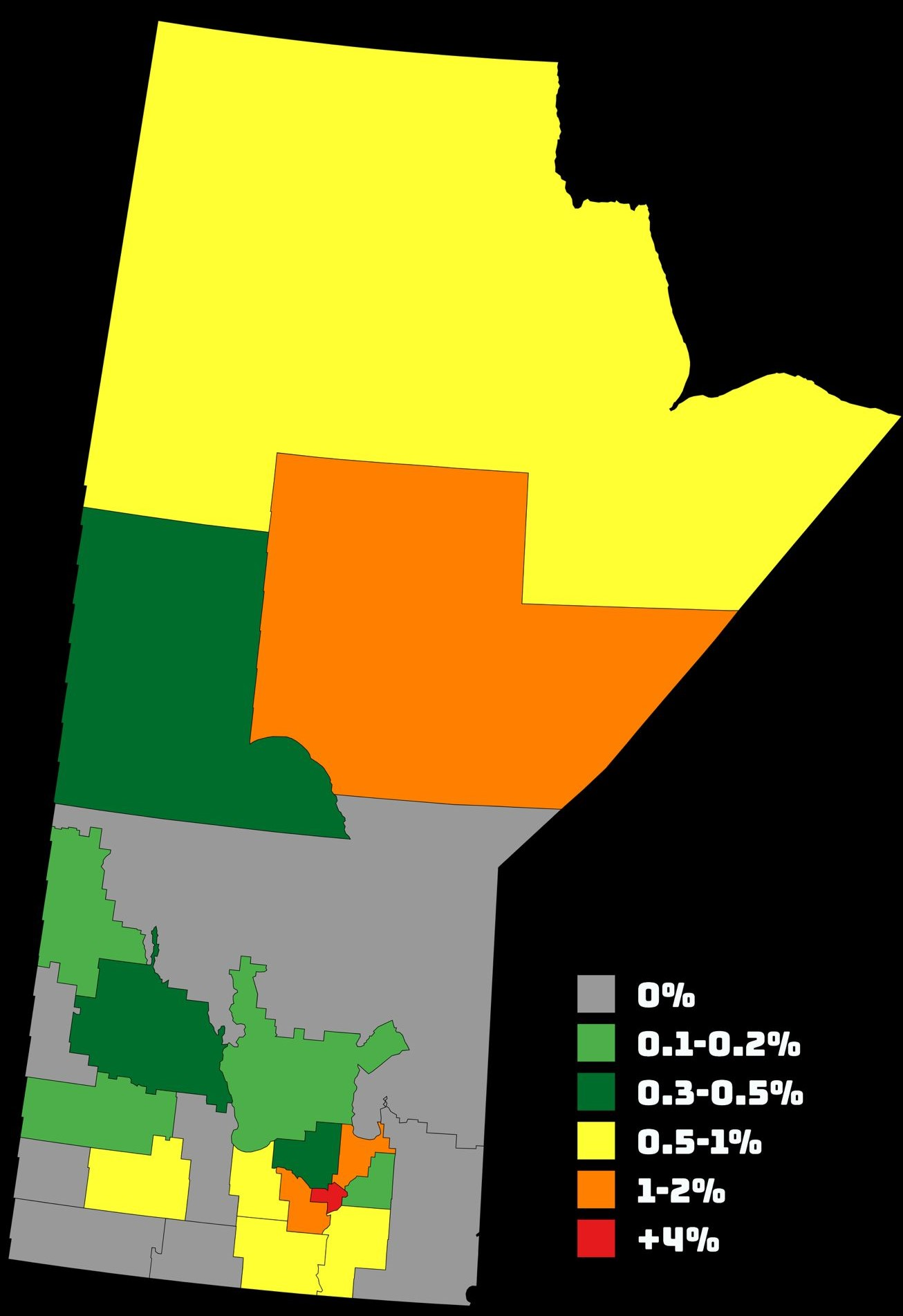
Population distribution of Sikh Canadians in Manitoba by census division, 2021 census

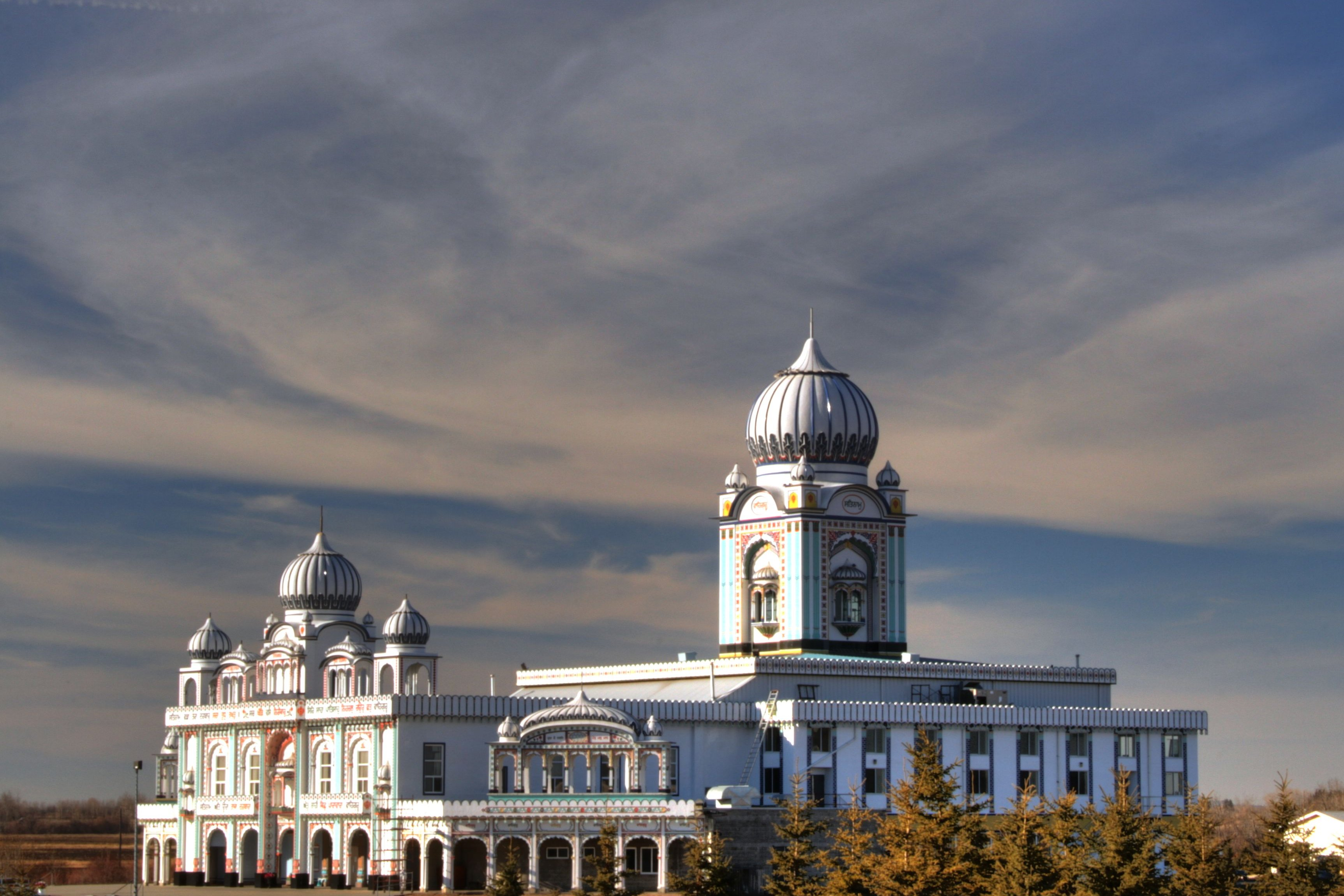
Sikh Gurdwara in Edmonton

In Alberta, most of the province's Sikhs live in either Calgary or Edmonton. Although many are first or second generation immigrants, Sikhs have lived in Calgary since at least 1908. The majority of Sikhs in Calgary are concentrated in the Northeast section of the city. Sikhs form over 20% of the population in some Northeast Calgary neighbourhoods, particularly Martindale, Taradale, Coral Springs and Saddle Ridge. Most of Edmonton's Sikhs can be found in the Southeast section of the city, particularly The Meadows, and Mill Woods. In The Meadows neighbourhood of Edmonton, Sikhs form over 30% of the population of Silver Berry.

The Sikh community in Manitoba is significant, at 2.7%, and largely concentrated in Winnipeg. Within Winnipeg, are established Sikh neighbourhoods in the northwest quadrant of the city, notably in The Maples and Mandalay West in the far north end of the city which are over 20% Sikh.

Sikh Canadians by metropolitan areas in the Prairies (2001−2021)
Metropolitan area	Province	2021		2011		2001	
Metropolitan area	Province	Pop.	%	Pop.	%	Pop.	%
Calgary CMA	Alberta	56,060	3.83%	30,420	2.54%	13,320	1.41%
Edmonton CMA	Alberta	44,440	3.18%	20,425	1.79%	9,405	1.01%
Winnipeg CMA	Manitoba	33,435	4.08%	9,885	1.38%	5,320	0.8%
Regina CA	Saskatchewan	4,455	1.82%	930	0.45%	290	0.15%
Saskatoon CMA	Saskatchewan	3,365	1.08%	610	0.24%	175	0.08%
Grande Prairie CA	Alberta	510	0.81%	225	0.41%	330	0.9%
Brandon CA	Manitoba	430	0.82%	105	0.2%	15	0.04%
Medicine Hat CA	Alberta	405	0.54%	195	0.27%	0	0%
Thompson CA	Manitoba	400	3.1%	80	0.63%	95	0.72%
Lethbridge CMA	Alberta	335	0.28%	80	0.08%	35	0.05%
Wood Buffalo CA	Alberta	310	0.42%	260	0.39%	60	0.14%
Red Deer CMA	Alberta	285	0.29%	125	0.14%	110	0.17%
Steinbach CA	Manitoba	275	1.56%	0	0%	—N/a	—N/a
Prince Albert CA	Saskatchewan	235	0.54%	0	0%	0	0%
Winkler CA	Manitoba	220	0.68%	—N/a	—N/a	—N/a	—N/a
Lloydminster CA	Alberta- Saskatchewan	200	0.56%	25	0.08%	10	0.05%
Portage la Prairie CA	Manitoba	150	1.17%	0	0%	0	0%
Yorkton CA	Saskatchewan	130	0.67%	0	0%	0	0%
Moose Jaw CA	Saskatchewan	115	0.34%	0	0%	30	0.09%
North Battleford CA	Saskatchewan	115	0.61%	0	0%	0	0%
Swift Current CA	Saskatchewan	80	0.44%	0	0%	0	0%
Okotoks CA	Alberta	75	0.25%	60	0.25%	—N/a	—N/a
Strathmore CA	Alberta	75	0.53%	0	0%	—N/a	—N/a
Weyburn CA	Saskatchewan	60	0.51%	—N/a	—N/a	—N/a	—N/a
Estevan CA	Saskatchewan	35	0.28%	0	0%	10	0.08%
Canmore CA	Alberta	35	0.23%	0	0%	—N/a	—N/a
Camrose CA	Alberta	30	0.16%	0	0%	0	0%
Wetaskiwin CA	Alberta	25	0.21%	0	0%	20	0.18%
Lacombe CA	Alberta	20	0.15%	0	0%	—N/a	—N/a
Brooks CA	Alberta	15	0.1%	10	0.04%	0	0%
High River CA	Alberta	15	0.11%	50	0.39%	—N/a	—N/a
Sylvan Lake CA	Alberta	15	0.09%	0	0%	—N/a	—N/a
Cold Lake CA	Alberta	—N/a	—N/a	90	0.65%	10	0.04%

==== Ontario and Quebec ====
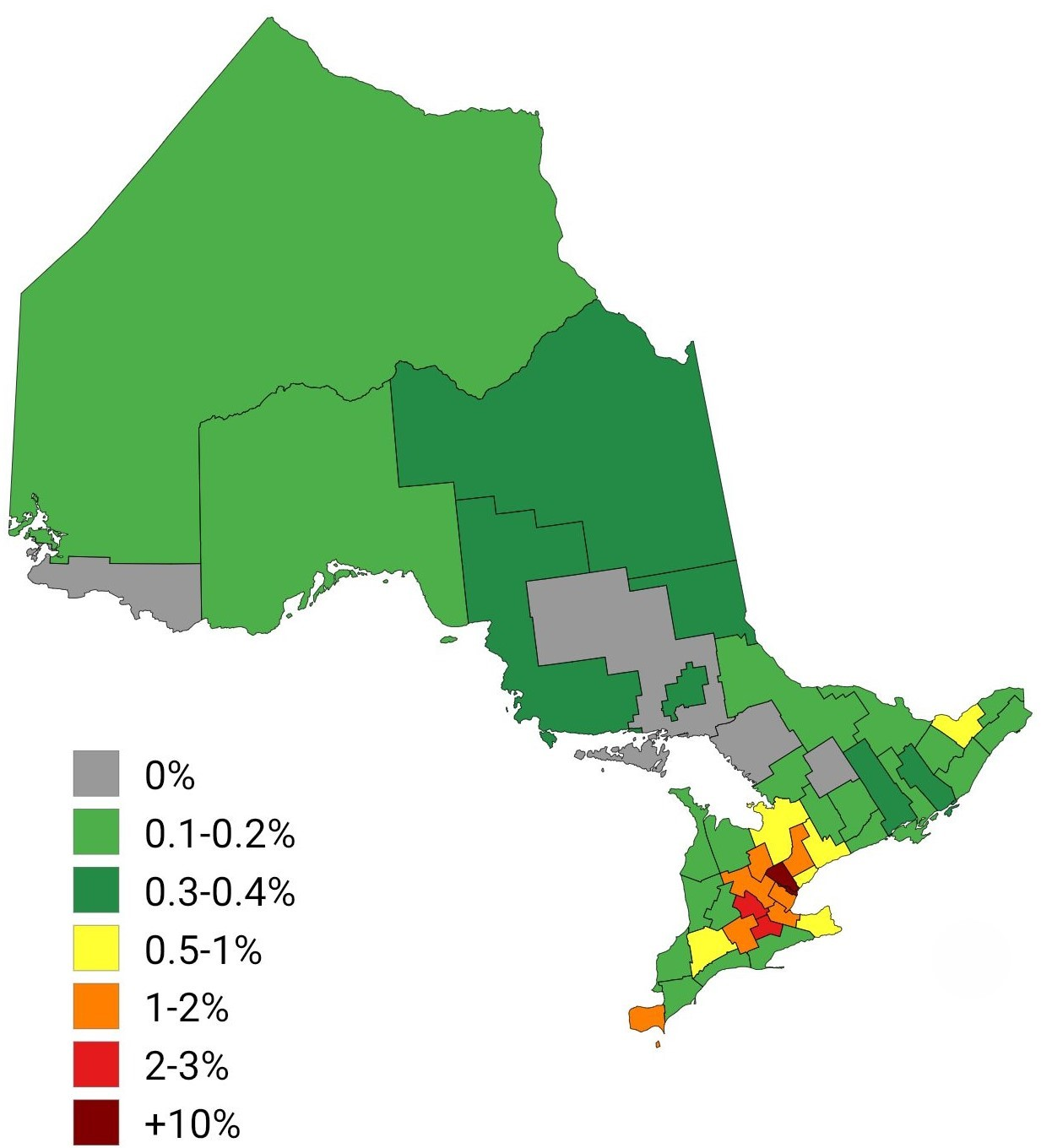
Population distribution of Sikh Canadians in Ontario by census division, 2021 census

Sikh communities are found in most cities and towns in Southern Ontario, while few are found living north of Barrie.

The Greater Toronto Area is home to the second largest community of Sikhs in Canada, after the Vancouver-Abbotsford area of British Columbia. Sikhs in Toronto traditionally lived in the Rexdale neighbourhood of Etobicoke, and Armadale in Scarborough. An older established Sikh community can be found in Malton, Mississauga as well, where Sikhs form nearly 25% of the population. Over half of Ontario's Sikhs can be found in Brampton, where they account for 19% of the city's total population. While Sikhs can be found living in all parts of Brampton, they form upwards of 35% of the population in the neighbourhoods of Churchville, Springdale and Castlemore.

Quebec is home to a more educated, upper-middle class Sikh community. Virtually the entire Sikh population of Quebec is found in the Montreal area. In the Montreal area, working class Sikhs are found in Park Extension, while wealthier Sikh families can be found in Dollard-des-Ormeaux, Vaudreuil-Dorion, and LaSalle, Quebec.

Sikh Canadians by metropolitan areas in Ontario and Quebec (2001−2021)
Metropolitan area	Province	2021		2011		2001	
Metropolitan area	Province	Pop.	%	Pop.	%	Pop.	%
Toronto CMA	Ontario	244,240	3.98%	159,910	2.9%	90,590	1.95%
Montreal CMA	Quebec	22,990	0.55%	9,210	0.25%	7,935	0.23%
Kitchener– Cambridge– Waterloo CMA	Ontario	12,295	2.16%	3,720	0.79%	2,510	0.61%
Hamilton CMA	Ontario	9,590	1.24%	5,920	0.84%	3,655	0.56%
Ottawa– Gatineau CMA	Ontario- Quebec	6,730	0.46%	3,445	0.28%	2,645	0.25%
Windsor CMA	Ontario	4,340	1.04%	1,900	0.6%	1,630	0.53%
London CMA	Ontario	4,265	0.8%	745	0.16%	515	0.12%
St. Catharines– Niagara CMA	Ontario	2,170	0.51%	205	0.05%	275	0.07%
Oshawa CMA	Ontario	1,550	0.38%	460	0.13%	460	0.16%
Barrie CMA	Ontario	1,260	0.6%	185	0.1%	95	0.06%

=== Metropolitan areas ===
10 largest Sikh Canadian populations by metropolitan areas (1981−2021)
Metropolitan area	2021		2011		2001		1991		1981	
Metropolitan area	Pop.	%	Pop.	%	Pop.	%	Pop.	%	Pop.	%
Toronto CMA, Ontario	244,240	3.98%	159,910	2.9%	90,590	1.95%	41,450	1.07%	11,620	0.39%
Vancouver CMA, British Columbia	222,160	8.52%	155,945	6.84%	99,005	5.03%	49,625	3.13%	22,390	1.79%
Calgary CMA, Alberta	56,055	3.83%	30,420	2.54%	13,320	1.41%	6,075	0.81%	2,505	0.43%
Edmonton CMA, Alberta	44,440	3.18%	19,555	1.79%	9,405	1.01%	6,480	0.78%	2,730	0.42%
Abbotsford-Mission CMA, British Columbia	41,665	21.69%	28,235	16.94%	16,780	11.57%	6,525	5.88%	2,530	3.45%
Winnipeg CMA, Manitoba	33,435	4.08%	9,885	1.38%	5,320	0.8%	3,290	0.51%	1,570	0.27%
Montréal CMA, Quebec	22,990	0.55%	9,210	0.25%	7,935	0.23%	3,880	0.13%	1,555	0.06%
Kitchener-Cambridge-Waterloo CMA, Ontario	12,295	2.16%	3,720	0.79%	2,510	0.61%	1,180	0.33%	870	0.31%
Hamilton CMA, Ontario	9,590	1.24%	5,920	0.84%	3,655	0.56%	2,240	0.38%	1,290	0.24%
Ottawa–Gatineau CMA, Ontario/Quebec	6,730	0.46%	3,445	0.28%	2,645	0.25%	1,575	0.17%	605	0.08%
Canada	771,790	2.12%	454,965	1.38%	278,410	0.94%	147,440	0.55%	67,715	0.28%

=== Subdivisions ===
10 largest Sikh Canadian populations by subdivisions (1991−2021)
Subdivision	2021		2011		2001		1991	
Subdivision	Pop.	%	Pop.	%	Pop.	%	Pop.	%
Brampton, Ontario	163,260	25.11%	97,790	18.76%	34,510	10.64%	8,635	3.7%
Surrey, British Columbia	154,415	27.45%	104,720	22.6%	56,330	16.29%	20,905	8.59%
Calgary, Alberta	49,465	3.83%	28,565	2.64%	13,200	1.52%	6,055	0.86%
Edmonton, Alberta	41,385	4.15%	19,555	2.46%	9,240	1.41%	6,305	1.03%
Abbotsford, British Columbia	38,395	25.46%	26,145	19.97%	15,225	13.38%	5,300 (Note: Including the District of Matsqui, which was amalgamated with Abbotsford in 1995)	6.21%
Winnipeg, Manitoba	32,510	4.41%	9,800	1.51%	5,285	0.87%	3,250	0.53%
Mississauga, Ontario	24,505	3.44%	23,995	3.39%	23,425	3.84%	12,560	2.72%
Toronto, Ontario	21,545	0.78%	20,405	0.79%	22,565	0.92%	15,665	0.69%
Delta, British Columbia	19,235	17.93%	10,495	10.63%	8,255	8.57%	3,695	4.18%
Vancouver, British Columbia	16,535	2.54%	16,815	2.85%	15,200	2.82%	12,935	2.78%

=== Electoral districts ===
20 largest Sikh Canadian populations by federal electoral district
Federal electoral district	Province/territory	2021		Member of Parliament (Note: Members of Parliament in bold are Sikhs.)	Party
Federal electoral district	Province/territory	Pop.	%	Member of Parliament	Party
Surrey—Newton	British Columbia	62,340	51.47%	Sukh Dhaliwal	Liberal
Brampton East	Ontario	53,030	40.44%	Maninder Sidhu	Liberal
Brampton West	Ontario	39,495	24.4%	Amarjeet Gill	Conservative
Surrey Centre	British Columbia	36,070	27.74%	Randeep Sarai	Liberal
Calgary Skyview	Alberta	34,850	21.97%	Amanpreet Gill	Conservative
Brampton North	Ontario	31,785	25.59%	Ruby Sahota	Liberal
Fleetwood—Port Kells	British Columbia	30,380	24.5%	Gurbux Saini	Liberal
Brampton South	Ontario	28,290	21.91%	Sonia Sidhu	Liberal
Edmonton Mill Woods	Alberta	23,945	19.17%	Tim Uppal	Conservative
Abbotsford	British Columbia	19,820	18.35%	Sukhman Gill	Conservative
Mission—Matsqui—Fraser Canyon	British Columbia	19,355	19.51%	Brad Vis	Conservative
Delta	British Columbia	19,270	17.61%	Jill McKnight	Liberal
Cloverdale—Langley City	British Columbia	18,745	14.46%	Tamara Jansen	Conservative
Winnipeg North	Manitoba	14,230	14.24%	Kevin Lamoureux	Liberal
Mississauga—Malton	Ontario	13,945	12%	Iqwinder Gaheer	Liberal
Dufferin—Caledon	Ontario	12,120	8.56%	Kyle Seeback	Conservative
Vancouver South	British Columbia	10,775	9.98%	Harjit Sajjan	Liberal
Brampton Centre	Ontario	10,660	10.27%	Amandeep Sodhi	Liberal
Edmonton—Wetaskiwin	Alberta	9,930	4.79%	Mike Lake	Conservative
South Surrey—White Rock	British Columbia	9,410	8.07%	Ernie Klassen	Liberal

Surrey—Newton and Brampton East are the only national electoral districts outside of Punjab where Sikhism is the most followed religion.

== Memorials ==
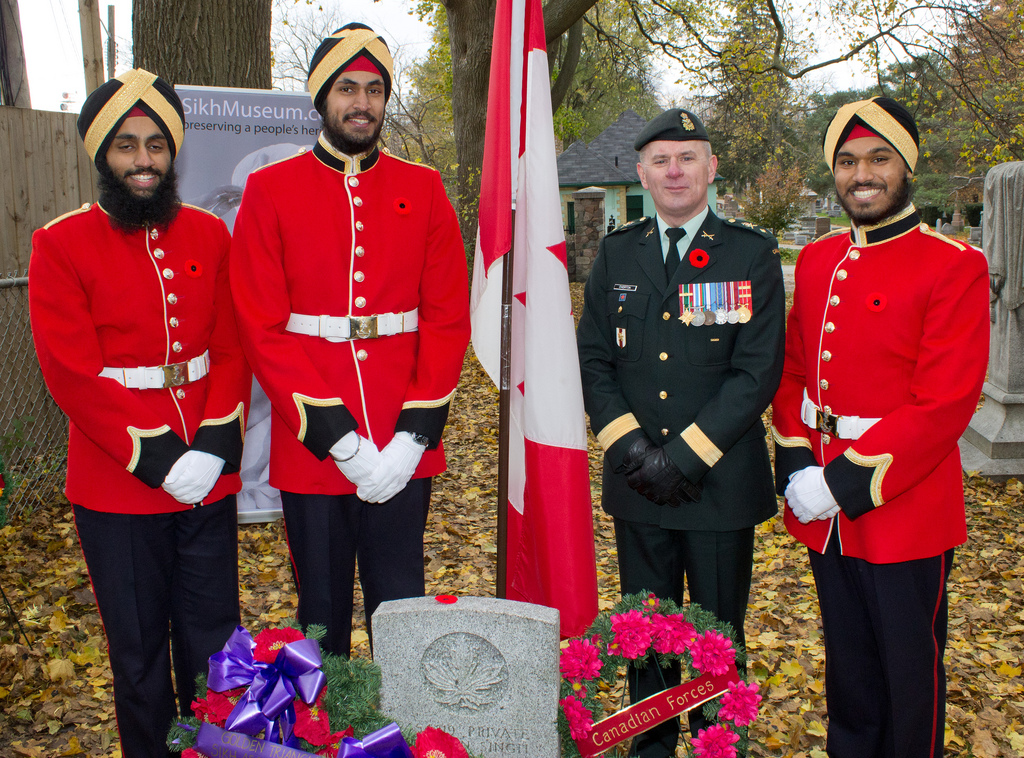
NCdt Tejvinder Toor, OCdt Saajandeep Sarai and OCdt. Sarabjot Anand represent Royal Military College of Canada at Private Buckham Singh grave, an annual Sikh Remembrance Day service which is held at Mount Hope Cemetery in Kitchener, Ontario.

=== Sikh Remembrance Day ===
Since 2009, Sikh members of the Canadian Forces (CF) have attended the annual Sikh Remembrance Day service which is held at the Mount Hope Cemetery in Kitchener, Ontario. This cemetery holds the only military grave in Canada belonging to a Sikh soldier, Private Buckham Singh who fought in World War I. In 2012, NCdt Tejvinder Toor, OCdt Saajandeep Sarai & OCdt Sarabjot Anand represented Royal Military College of Canada at the event in uniform.

== Celebrations ==
=== Nagar Kirtan ===
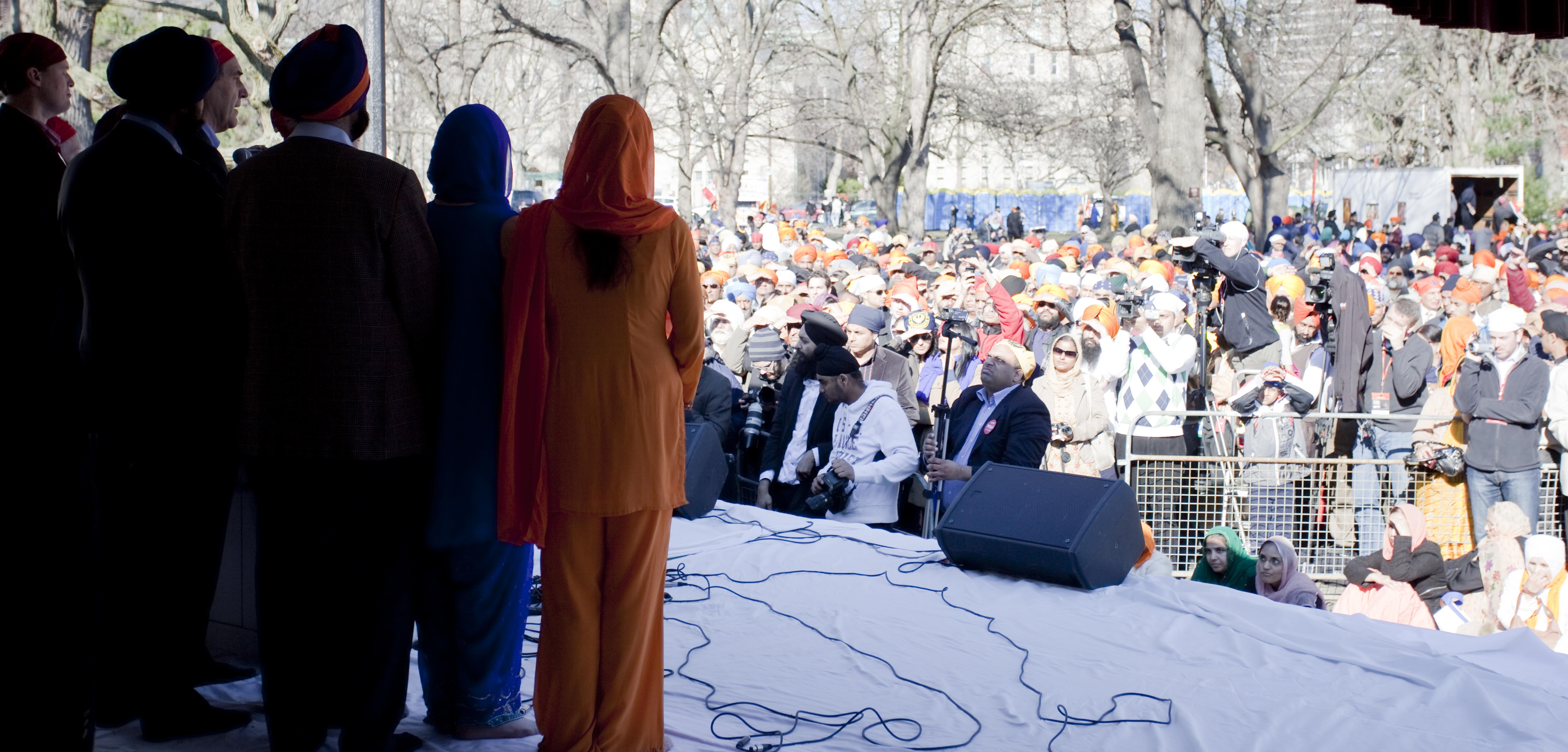
Khalsa Day celebration

Various Nagar Kirtan celebrations happen in Canada, with most starting in British Columbia. In British Columbia, various places celebrate the Nagar Kirtan, though it is mainly celebrated in the cities of Vancouver and Surrey. In Vancouver, the Nagar Kirtan, is used to celebrate the Visakhi and the birth of Khalsa. Various Canadian Sikhs, of various ethnic origins, are present in the parade, which usually happens on Easter Weekend. In Abbotsford, the celebration happens on Labour Day Weekend and is commemorated in the celebration of the Parkash Divas of the Guru Granth Sahib Ji. The parade in Abbotsford takes place near the Kalgidar Durbar.

=== Vaisakhi ===
Vaisakhi celebrations happen in both British Columbia and Ontario, with many including a Nagar Kirtan parade. In Ontario, the Vaisakhi celebrations are reported to get bigger and bigger in terms of festivities and attending populace every year. Many Sikh academies and institutes also participate in the Ontario parades, such as the Akal Academy Brampton. While the Nagar Kirtan in the Ontario Vaisakhi celebration starts at the Malton Gurudwara and ends at the Sikh Spiritual Centre, festivities go on until the Rexdale Gurudwara is reached, it is organized annually by the Ontario Gurdwara Committee. Nagar Kirtan parades also take place in Alberta. Both the cities of Calgary and Edmonton hold them around the May long weekend.

== Education ==
Punjabi is the native language of the Sikh faith; it is spoken commonly throughout both converts and Indo-Canadians. There is a large population of Sikh people in the city of Surrey; this has led to the availability of a course in the Punjabi language in the fifth grade using the British Columbia Punjabi Language Curriculum. In specific schools in the city of Abbotsford, the Punjabi language too is available as a course that can be taken following the fifth grade in elementary school levels. For Abbotsford, however, when the curriculum was suggested to a more mainstream stray of schools, controversy was brought up, despite Punjabi being Abbotsford's second largest language. Many comments brought up were those who stated that only English and French should be taught in the district and that the costs to parents would be high, as always these comments were believed to be racially driven due to other secondary languages being taught for free in the district.

== Controversy ==
=== Kirpan cases ===
Various controversies have arisen involving the sacred Sikh dagger, the Kirpan. Most of these cases have taken place in the Canadian province of Quebec.

==== Quebec Legislature ====
In February 2011, the Quebec National Assembly banned religious daggers, of which the kirpan was included. Upon the announcement, Canadian Sikh Liberal MP Navdeep Bains revealed his surprise and anger as he had worn the kirpan to the Supreme Court of Canada and the United States Congress without any trouble. The ban sparked a small debate amongst the Canadian Legislatures and news programs as well as backlash from the World Sikh Organization. Following this was a vote that the kirpan be banned from all parliamentary buildings including the House of Commons of Canada. The vote happened in favour of the kirpan, despite fierce opposition from the Bloc Québécois.

==== Montreal schools ====
In the 2006 Supreme Court of Canada decision of Multani v. Commission scolaire Marguerite‑Bourgeoys the court held that the banning of the kirpan in a school environment offended Canada's Charter of Rights and Freedoms, nor could the limitation be upheld under s. 1 of the Charter, as per R. v. Oakes. The issue started when a 12-year-old schoolboy dropped a 20 cm (8-inch) long kirpan in school. School staff and parents were very concerned, and the student was required to attend school under police supervision until the court decision was reached. In September 2008, Montreal police announced that a 13-year-old student would be charged after he allegedly threatened another student with his kirpan. However, while he was declared guilty of threatening his schoolmates, he was granted an absolute discharge for the crime on April 15, 2009.

==== Calgary Telus controversy ====
The World Sikh Organization representative Jasbeer Singh, who had involvement in the Multani Kirpan case, represented the WSO who had called on the Calgary Telus Convention Center for an apology on another kirpan case. In the Calgary stadium, a Gurdas Mann concert in 2009 had to be shut down after Sikh ticket holders had refused to remove their kirpans. Jasbeer was reportedly furious due to the case having occurred after it was proven that the kirpan was allowed to legally be worn in public areas due to the Multani v. Commission scolaire Marguerite-Bourgeoys case. Concert promoter Nirmal Dhaliwal revealed his intent on suing the centre due to the lack of revenue brought by the case.

=== Turban cases ===
The Royal Canadian Mounted Police came under fire when they refused to let turbaned Canadian Sikh officers join their service. In doing so they had indefinitely banned all RCMP officers from wearing a turban, requiring them to wear the standard and traditional RCMP headdress. The ban was a result of the activism of a petition leader named Herman Bittner, who maintained that he was preserving history rather than discriminating. The ban was lifted in 1990 and turbaned Sikh officers were permitted to join the RCMP.

== Notable people ==
- List of Canadian Sikhs

== See also ==
- Indian Canadians
- South Asian Canadians
- South Asian Canadians in British Columbia
- South Asian Canadians in Greater Vancouver
- South Asian Canadians in the Greater Toronto Area
- Anti-Sikh Hate in Canada
- Sikh Heritage Month
- Sikhism in the United States
- Sikhism in Australia
- Sikhism in the United Kingdom
- Sikhism in New Zealand
