= Punjabi Canadians =

Canadian people of Punjabi descent

Punjabi Canadians Canadiens pendjabi
Panjābī Kanēḍvī
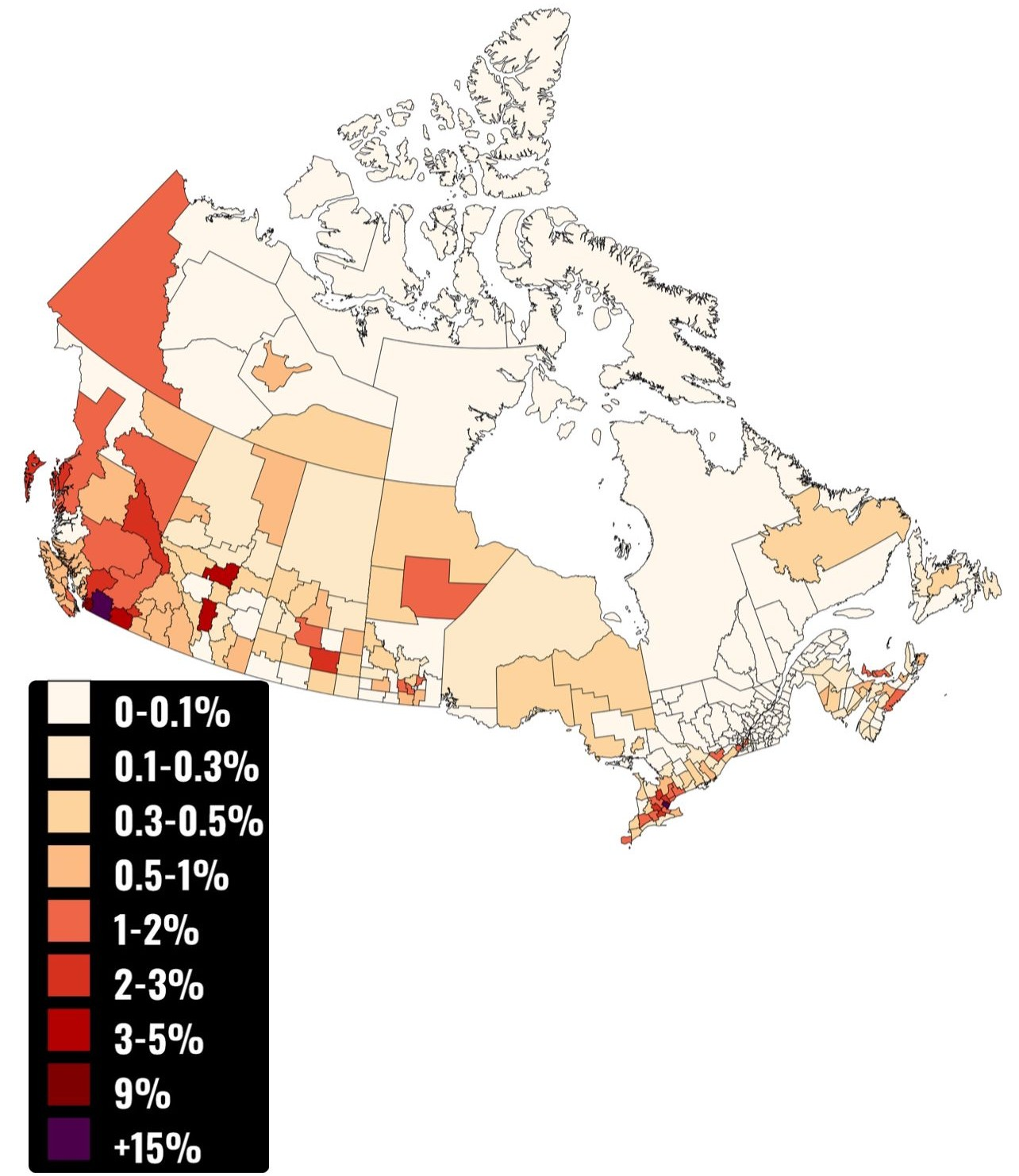
- Population distribution of Punjabi Canadians by census division, 2021 census

Total population
- 942,170 (Note: Statistic includes all speakers of the Punjabi language, as many multi-generation individuals do not speak the language as a mother tongue, but instead as a second or third language.); 2.6% of the total Canadian population (2021)

Regions with significant populations
- Ontario: 397,865 (2.8%)
- British Columbia: 315,000 (6.4%)
- Alberta: 126,385 (3.0%)
- Manitoba: 42,820 (3.3%)
- Quebec: 34,290 (0.4%)

Languages
- Canadian English • Punjabi • Canadian French • Hindi • Urdu

Religion
- Predominantly: Sikhism (81.4%); Minorities: Hinduism (6.9%); Islam (6.8%); Irreligion (3.7%); Christianity (1.1%); Buddhism (0.02%); Judaism (0.01%); Indigenous (0.005%); Zoroastrianism · Jainism · Others (0.05%) (Note: Religious breakdown proportions based on "Punjabi" ethnic or cultural origin response on the 2021 census.)

Related ethnic groups
- Punjabi Americans • British Punjabis • Punjabi Australians • Indian Canadians • Pakistani Canadians

Punjabi Canadians are Canadian citizens of Punjabi descent, numbering approximately 950,000 and accounting for roughly 2.6% of Canada's population, as per the 2021 Canadian census. Their heritage originates wholly or partly from the Punjab region of India and Pakistan.

Punjabis first arrived in Canada during the late 19th century to work in the forestry industry. Primarily concentrated in the western province of British Columbia, the Punjabi population initially peaked in 1908 before an ensuing period of population decline and stagnation followed. In the mid 20th century Canadian immigration laws were relaxed, fostering rapid population growth into the present day.

Today, the largest Punjabi communities in Canada are situated in the province of British Columbia, concentrated in Vancouver, and the province of Ontario, particularly in Toronto.

== History ==
=== Late 19th century ===
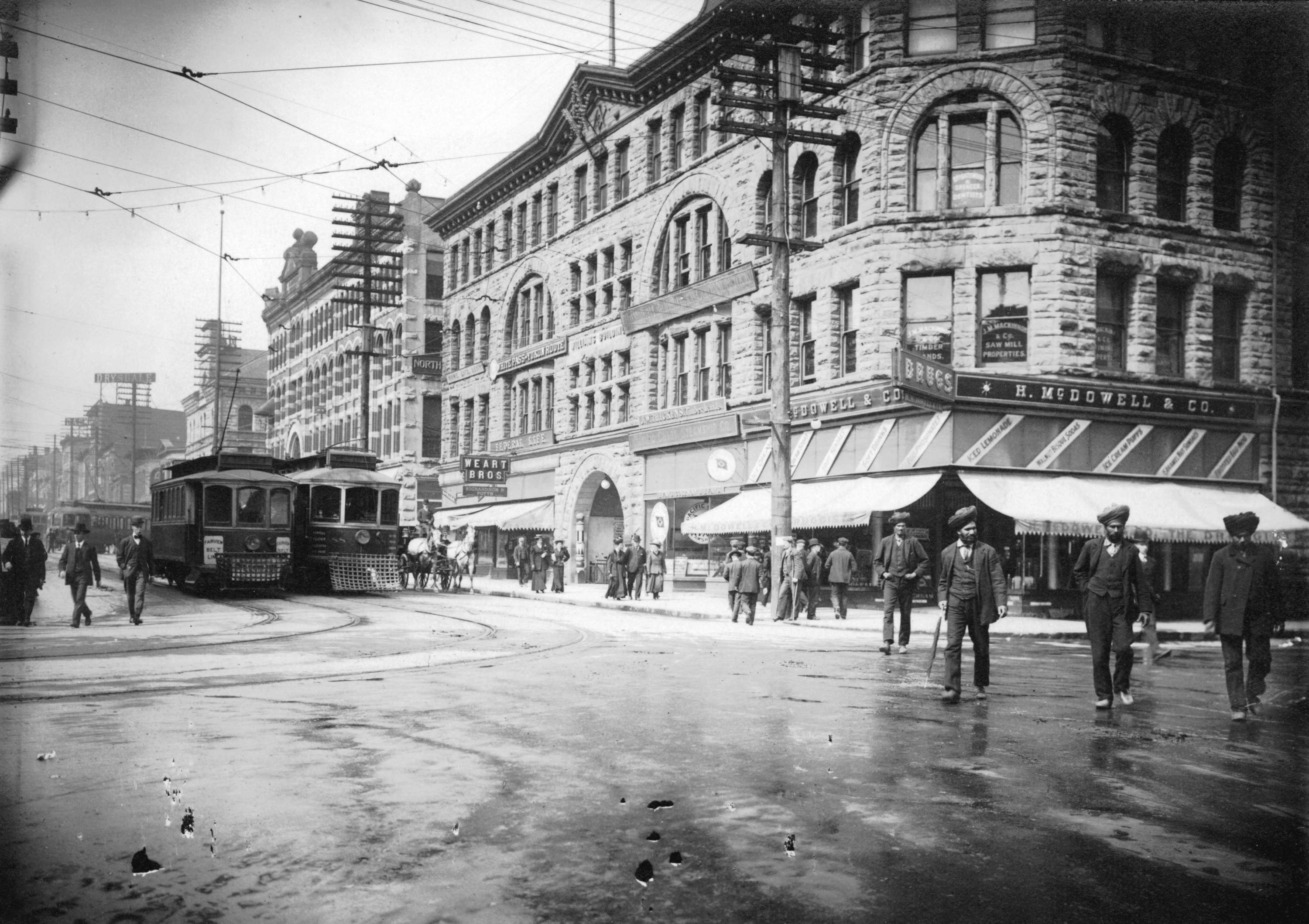
Punjabi Sikhs in Vancouver, 1908

In 1897, the first persons of Punjabi origin visited British Columbia, almost 50 years after the fall of the Sikh Empire at the hands of British colonialism and imperialism. The first Punjabi visitors to Canada in 1897 were Sikh soldiers of the Sikh Regiment and the Punjab Regiment in the British Indian Army transiting from India to the United Kingdom during the Diamond Jubilee of Queen Victoria. The Punjabis ultimately became the first South Asian-origin group to settle in Canada.

=== Early 20th century ===
In 1900, the population of Punjabis in Canada increased to 100. By 1906, this number increased to 1,500. The vast majority were Sikhs and came from Kapurthala, Hoshiarpur, Jalandhar, Amritsar, Ferozpur, and Ludhiana. At the turn of the century the mayor of Vancouver did not permit cremation, so when the first Sikh died in 1907 he could not be cremated in the Vancouver city limits. Christian missionaries did not permit him to be buried with whites. Even though the missionaries promoted burial, the Sikhs instead cremated the man in a distant wilderness. This prompted Sikhs to establish their own religious institutions.

Initially, Punjabis were guaranteed jobs by agents of big Canadian companies like the Canadian Pacific Railway and the Hudson's Bay Company. Overcoming their initial reluctance to go to these countries due to the treatment of Asians by the white population, many young men chose to go, having been assured that they would not meet the same fate. They were British subjects and Canada was a part of the British Empire.

A notable moment in early Punjabi Canadian history was in 1902 when Punjabi Sikh settlers first arrived in Golden, British Columbia to work at the Columbia River Lumber Company. This was a theme amongst most early Punjabi settlers in Canada to find work in the agricultural and forestry sectors in British Columbia. Punjabis became a prominent ethnic group within the sawmill workforce in British Columbia almost immediately after initial arrival to Canada.

The early settlers in Golden built the first Gurdwara (Sikh Temple) in Canada and North America in 1905, which would later be destroyed by fire in 1926. The second Gurdwara to be built in Canada was in 1908 in Kitsilano (Vancouver), aimed at serving a growing number of Punjabi Sikh settlers who worked at nearby sawmills along False Creek at the time. The Gurdwara would later close and be demolished in 1970, with the temple society relocating to the newly built Gurdwara on Ross Street, in South Vancouver.

As a result, the oldest existing Gurdwara in Canada today is the Gur Sikh Temple, located in Abbotsford, British Columbia. Built in 1911, the temple was designated as a national historic site of Canada in 2002 and is the third-oldest Gurdwara in the country. Later, the fourth Gurdwara to be built Canada was established in 1912 in Victoria on Topaz Avenue, while the fifth soon was built at the Fraser Mills (Coquitlam) settlement in 1913, followed a few years later by the sixth at the Queensborough (New Westminster) settlement in 1919, and the seventh at the Paldi (Vancouver Island) settlement, also in 1919.

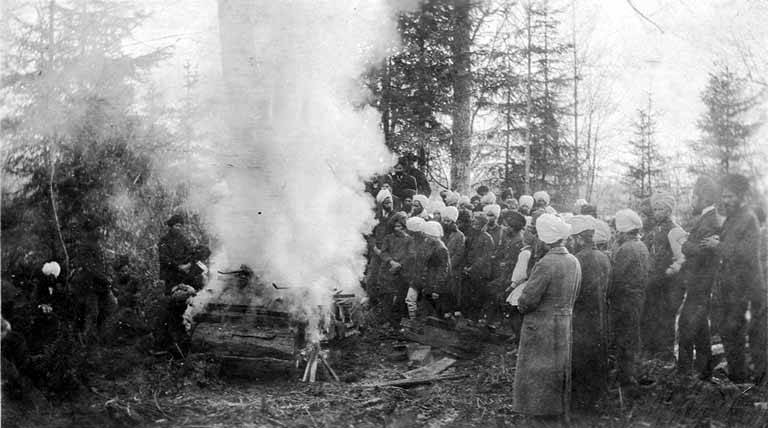
Sikhs attending a funeral outside Vancouver, circa 1914

Oftentimes, upon arrival to British Columbia, early Punjabi immigrants and settlers faced widespread racism by other ethnic groups who had also immigrated and settled in Canada in prior decades, including English Canadians, Scottish Canadians, or Irish Canadians. Most of the white Canadians feared workers who would work for less pay, and that an influx of more immigrants would threaten their jobs.

The continued tensions caused the Punjabi population to fall from a high of 4,700 in 1907, to less than 2,000 by 1914. In 1908 the British Columbia government passed a law preventing Indian men from voting. Because eligibility for federal elections originated from provincial voting lists, East Indian men were unable to vote in federal elections.

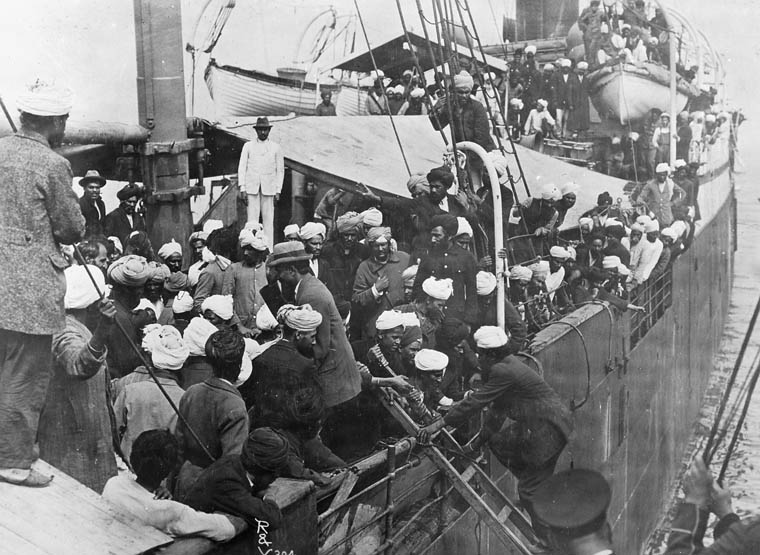
Punjabis aboard the Komagata Maru in Vancouver's Burrard Inlet, 1914

Punjabis were later faced by one of the most infamous racial exclusion acts in Canadian history. In 1914, The Komagata Maru, a steamliner carrying 376 passengers from Punjab docked in Vancouver. Of them, 24 were admitted to Canada, but the other 352 passengers were not allowed to disembark in Canada, and the ship was forced to return to India. The passengers comprised 337 Punjabi Sikhs, 27 Punjabi Muslims and 12 Punjabi Hindus.

=== Mid 20th century ===
Punjabi−Canadian Population History (Note: Census data on total language speakers began during the 1991 census. 1981 (x1.375) and 1986 census (x1.5) figures are regression estimates derived using the proportion of total Punjabi speakers to Punjabi mother tongue speakers from the 1991 census, which was approximately 1.5 times greater.)
Year	Pop.	±%
1981	73,810	—
1986	95,470	+29.3%
1991	167,930	+75.9%
1996	248,695	+48.1%
2001	338,720	+36.2%
2006	456,090	+34.7%
2011	545,730	+19.7%
2016	668,240	+22.4%
2021	942,170	+41.0%
Source: Statistics Canada

By 1923, Vancouver became the primary cultural, social, and religious centre of Punjabi Canadians as it had the largest ethnic Indian population of any city in North America. The Punjabi population in Canada would remain relatively stable throughout the mid 20th century as the exclusionary immigration policies practiced by the Canadian government continued. However, a shift began to occur after World War Two. The Canadian government re-enfranchised the Indo-Canadian community with the right to vote in 1947.

A significant event in Punjabi Canadian history occurred in 1950 when 25 years after settling in Canada and nine years after moving to British Columbia from Toronto, Naranjan "Giani" Singh Grewall became the first individual of Punjabi ancestry in Canada and North America to be elected to public office after successfully running for a position on the board of commissioners in Mission, BC against six other candidates. Grewall was re-elected to the board of commissioners in 1952 and by 1954, was elected to became mayor of Mission.

"Thank you all citizens of Mission City [...] It is a credit to this community to elect the first East Indian to public office in the history of our great dominion. It shows your broad-mindedness, tolerance and consideration.".

— Notice by Naranjan Singh Grewall in the local Mission newspaper following his election to public office, 1950

A millwright and union official, and known as a sportsman and humanitarian philanthropist as well as a lumberman, Grewall eventually established himself as one of the largest employers and most influential business leaders in the northern Fraser Valley, owned six sawmills and was active in community affairs serving on the boards or as chairman of a variety of organizations, and was instrumental in helping create Mission's municipal tree farm. With strong pro-labour beliefs despite his role as a mill-owner, after a scandal embroiled the provincial Ministry of Forestry under the-then Social Credit party government, he referred to holders of forest management licenses across British Columbia as Timber Maharajahs, and cautioned that within a decade, three or four giant corporations would predominantly control the entire industry in the province, echoing similarities to the archaic zamindar system in South Asia. He later ran unsuccessfully for the Co-operative Commonwealth Federation (the precursor of today's New Democratic Party) in the Dewdney riding in the provincial election of 1956.

While by the 1950s, Punjabi Canadians had gained respect in business in British Columbia primarily for their work in owning sawmills and aiding the development of the provincial forestry industry, racism still existed especially in the upper echelons of society. As such, during the campaign period and in the aftermath of running for MLA in 1956, Grewall received personal threats, while the six mills he owned along with his house were all set ablaze by arsonists. (Note: When Grewall was nominated as a candidate for the CCF party in the Dewdney riding in 1956, this drew excitement. But, according to Barrett, Grewall faced open discrimination on the campaign trail. “The former mayor knew the risk he was taking and many people were surprised he took this risk to enter the race,” said Barrett. Barrett said Grewall overcame many racial insults along the way. “Every kid in the North Fraser, who thinks he or she is being discriminated against, should read the Grewall story and the challenges he faced.” Grewall was later found dead in a Seattle motel room with a gunshot wound to the head in July of 1957. He was 47 years of age.) One year later, on July 17, 1957, while on a business trip, he was suspiciously found dead in a Seattle motel, having been shot in the head. (Note: After losing his MLA bid in 1956 to SoCred Labor Minister Lyle Wicks, Grewal began receiving threats. Fires were set at his mills and his house was set ablaze. On July 17, 1957, while on a business trip, Grewall was found dead in a Seattle motel. He had been shot in the head. Although local police ruled it a suicide, Grewall's family believes he was a victim of foul play. Grewall was survived by his wife and three children, who left Mission City shortly after his death. Despite the suspicious circumstances of his death, Grewall's story is more notable for his legacy of community involvement than for his untimely demise.) Grewall Street in Mission was named in his honour.

“Every kid in the North Fraser, who thinks he or she is being discriminated against, should read the Grewall story and the challenges he faced.”.

— Former B.C. premier Dave Barrett on Naranjan Singh Grewall

During the 1950s, immigration restrictions were loosened and Vancouver remained the centre of Punjabi immigration through the mid-20th century. In the post-war years into the early 1950s, Punjabis were geographically dispersed in the Lower Mainland, however two concentrations soon developed; first in South Vancouver (Sunset neighbourhood) during the late 1950s and throughout the 1960s, followed by South Burnaby (Edmonds neighbourhood). Out of these two newly formed ethnic enclaves, it was South Vancouver which began to flourish as the Punjabi Market was soon founded in the late 1960s.

In 1967, all immigration quotas based on specific ethnic groups were scrapped in Canada, thus allowing the ethnic Punjabi population in Canada to grow rapidly thereafter. Most continued to settle in across British Columbia, notably in the Lower Mainland, Vancouver Island, and the interior. As many Punjabis worked in the forestry industry, interior and northern regions of British Columbia began to see a rise in Punjabi immigration in the 1960s. Prince George, the economic centre of Northern BC, became a secondary hub for early Punjabi immigration.

Later in the 1970s, Punjabi population concentrations began appearing in North Delta, East Richmond, and Surrey. Vandalism against houses owned by Indo-Canadians and a Sikh gurdwara occurred in the 1970s, especially from 1974 to 1975 in Richmond.

=== Late 20th century to present ===
In 1986, following the British Columbia provincial election, Moe Sihota became the first Canadian of Punjabi ancestry to be elected to any provincial legislature in Canada. Sihota, who was born in Duncan, British Columbia in 1955, ran as the NDP Candidate in the riding of Esquimalt-Port Renfrew two years after being involved in municipal politics, as he was elected as an Alderman for the city of Esquimalt in 1984.

By the 1980s, the traditional Punjabi immigration patterns began to shift. Ontario soon became an important centre of immigration to Canada. Large Punjabi populations began to appear across the Greater Toronto Area, especially in Scarborough, Markham, Mississauga, Brampton, and Ajax. At the same time, Alberta also became another important immigration destination for Punjabis, with the third and fourth largest Punjabi Canadian populations in metropolitan areas now situated in Metro Calgary (primarily Northeast Calgary) and Metro Edmonton (primarily Southeast Edmonton in Mill Woods).

As of the 2011 census, 5.5% of residents reported speaking Punjabi at home in Metro Vancouver, while 21.3% of Surrey residents speak it as their primary language at home.

Today, the Punjabi population of Canada is 942,170 with the largest community located in Ontario (397,865), followed by British Columbia (315,000), and Alberta (126,385). In addition, Punjabi is the third most spoken language of the Parliament of Canada.

== Demography ==
Canadians of Punjabi descent total population (1991−2021)
Canadians of Punjabi descent percentage of the total population (1991−2021)

=== Population ===
Punjabi Canadian Population History 1981−2021
Year	Population	% of total population
1981	73,810	0.306%
1986	95,470	0.377%
1991	167,930	0.622%
1996	248,695	0.872%
2001	338,715	1.143%
2006	456,090	1.46%
2011	545,730	1.648%
2016	668,240	1.939%
2021	942,170	2.593%

Punjabi Canadian Proportion of the South Asian Canadian Population (1981−2021)
Province/territory	Percentage								
Province/territory	2021	2016	2011	2006	2001	1996	1991	1986	1981
British; Columbia	66.46%	66.85%	68.06%	69.5%	67.86%	68.1%	65.85%	68.61%	80.06%
Manitoba	60.13%	53.07%	47.88%	42.7%	44.61%	42.19%	38.18%	56.28%	38.28%
Yukon	47.34%	30%	28.77%	50%	43.9%	42.22%	62.5%	64.29%	35.29%
Alberta	42.46%	39.08%	39.49%	41.3%	39.3%	36.76%	32.9%	25.27%	29.15%
Prince Edward; Island	41.44%	18.97%	8%	5.88%	0%	15.38%	42.86%	5.88%	33.33%
Nova; Scotia	31.09%	11.89%	13.48%	12.94%	14.94%	20.08%	25.27%	11.63%	18.1%
Saskatchewan	29.76%	27.7%	25.75%	21.96%	21.92%	19.07%	17.19%	13.33%	24.09%
New; Brunswick	28.68%	6.9%	3.72%	5.08%	7.85%	5.11%	5.64%	6.32%	13.89%
Quebec	26.79%	18.67%	15.84%	20.05%	20.85%	18.08%	14.14%	11.43%	10.67%
Ontario	26.26%	23.85%	23.74%	24.21%	24.68%	23.19%	22.45%	16.28%	19.2%
Newfoundland and Labrador	22.86%	17.7%	5.75%	8.55%	13.51%	13.21%	21.56%	10.47%	14.48%
Northwest; Territories	22.58%	17.07%	15%	11.9%	17.5%	21.43%	29.55%	30%	27.27%
Nunavut	16.67%	11.54%	13.04%	11.76%	33.33%	—N/a	—N/a	—N/a	—N/a
Canada	36.64%	34.04%	33.77%	34.64%	35.17%	34.38%	33.22%	30.37%	33.06%

=== Religion ===
Religious breakdown of Punjabi Canadians (2021)
1. Sikhism (81.4%)
2. Hinduism (6.90%)
3. Islam (6.80%)
4. Irreligion (3.70%)
5. Christianity (1.10%)
6. Others (0.09%)

During the early stages of Punjabi immigration to Canada, most pioneers were of the Sikh faith.

A census report detailing the religious proportion breakdown of the Punjabi Canadian community was done between 2005 and 2007 by Statistics Canada, with results derived from the 2001 Canadian census. This report found that 85.9 per cent of Punjabi Canadians were adherents of the Sikh faith, followed by followed by Islam (6.9 per cent) and Hinduism (3.9 per cent), with smaller minorities adhering to Irreligion (1.6 per cent) and Christianity (1.6 per cent). (Note: For example, while those with Punjabi ancestry were predominantly Sikh (86%), [...])

The 2021 Canadian census revealed that 81.4 per cent of the Punjabi Canadian community were adherents of the Sikh faith, followed by Hinduism (6.9 per cent) and Islam (6.8 per cent), with smaller minorities adhering to Irreligion (3.7 per cent), Christianity (1.1 per cent), and Buddhism (0.02 per cent).

Punjabi Canadian demography by religion
Religious group	2021		2001	
Religious group	Pop.	%	Pop.	%
Sikhism	227,955	81.43%	40,485	85.85%
Hinduism	19,320	6.9%	1,820	3.86%
Islam	18,980	6.78%	3,240	6.87%
Irreligion	10,430	3.73%	760	1.61%
Christianity	3,005	1.07%	750	1.59%
Buddhism	50	0.02%	10	0.02%
Judaism	40	0.01%	10	0.02%
Indigenous spirituality	15	0.01%	—N/a	—N/a
Other	145	0.05%	100	0.21%
Total Punjabi Canadian responses	279,950	29.71%	47,160 (Note: Religious breakdown proportions based on "Punjabi" ethnic or cultural origin response on the 2001 census.)	13.92%
Total Punjabi Canadian population	942,170	100%	338,720	100%

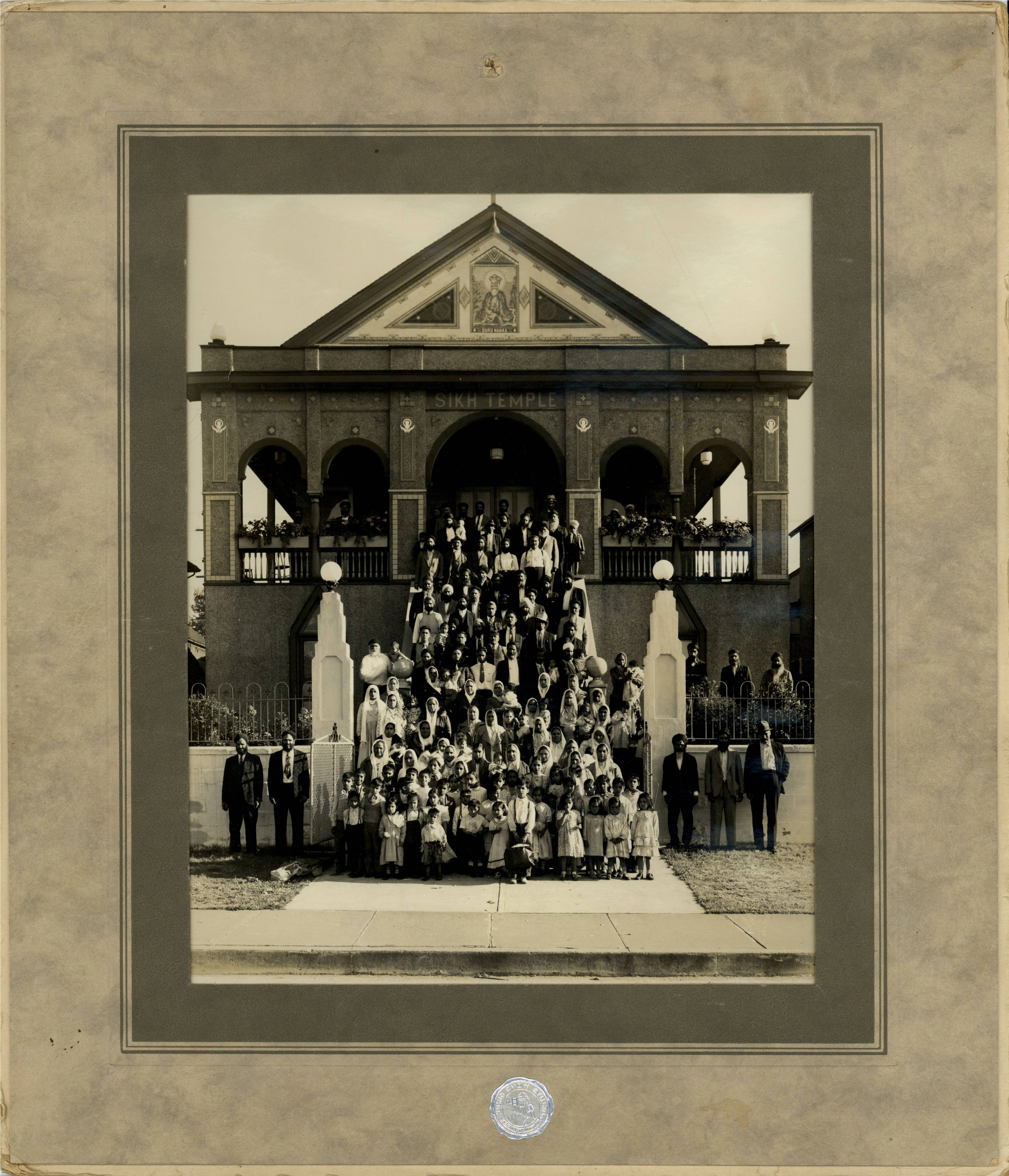
Sikh temple: Kitsilano, Vancouver, c. 1910.

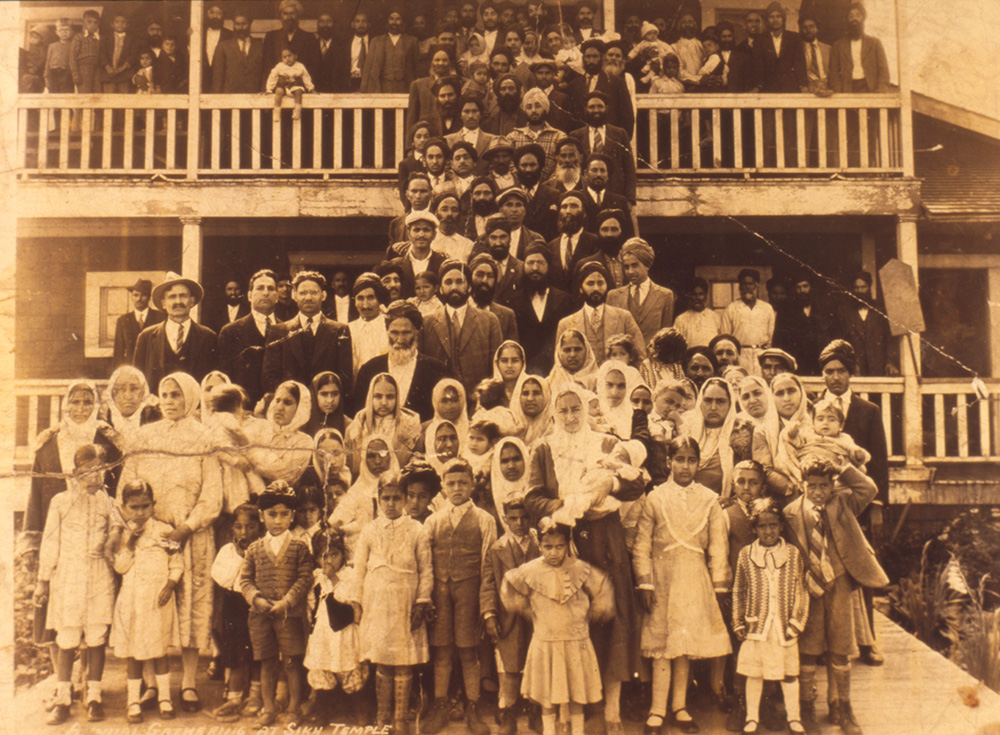
Sikh temple: Queensborough, New Westminster, c. 1931.

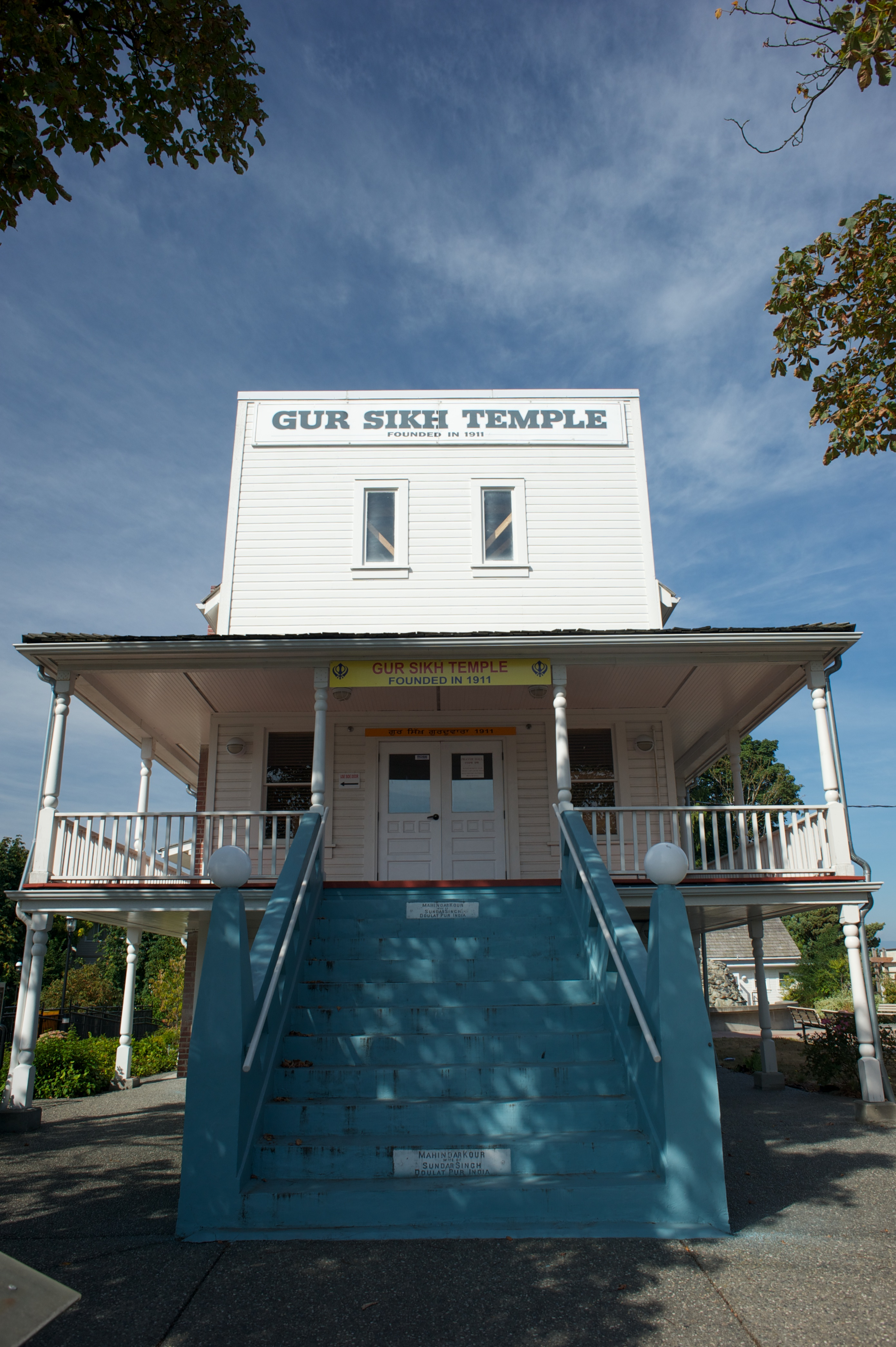
Gur Sikh Temple, Abbotsford

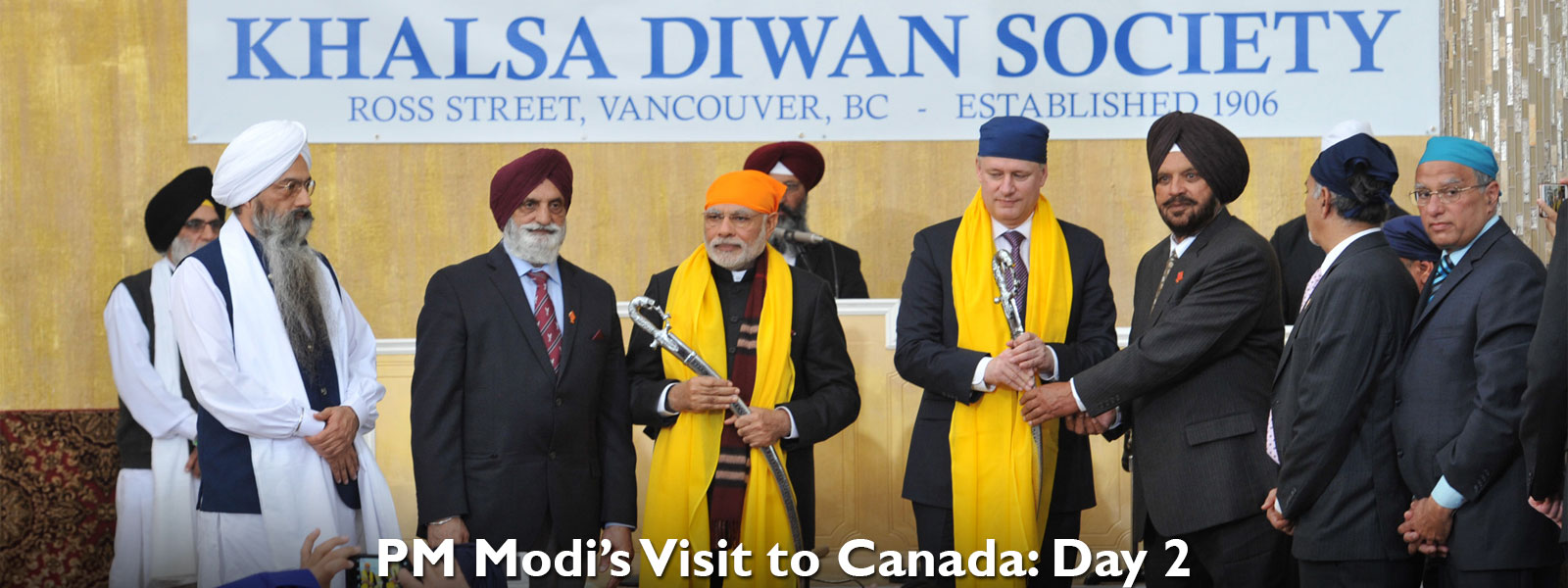
Sikh temple: Khalsa Diwan Society, Sunset neighbourhood, South Vancouver

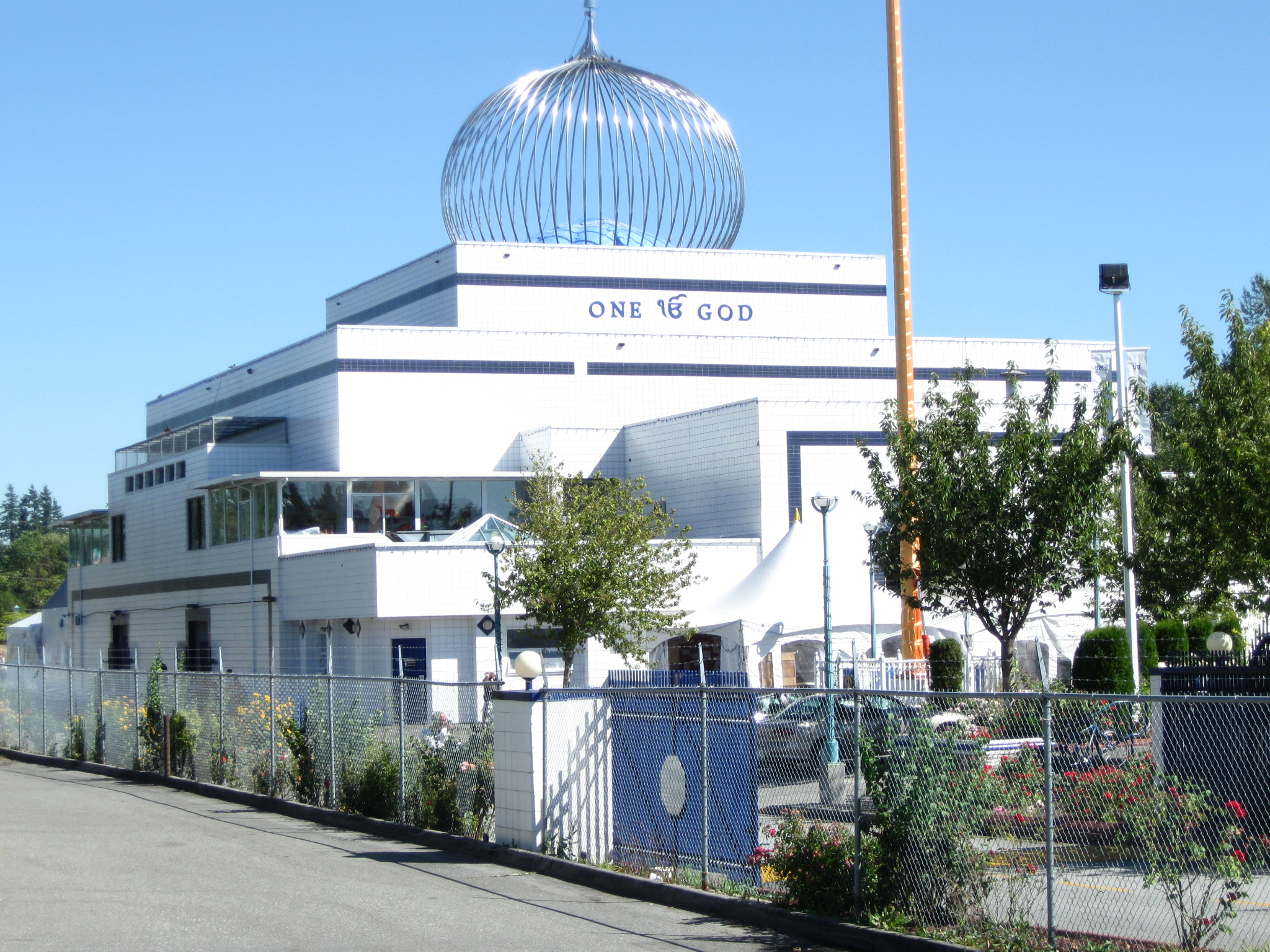
Sikh temple: North Delta/Newton, Surrey

== Geographical distribution ==
The largest Punjabi populations in Canada are located in British Columbia and Ontario. Alberta, Manitoba, and Quebec are also home to significant populations with Saskatchewan and Nova Scotia featuring small but rapidly growing Punjabi communities.

=== Provinces & territories ===
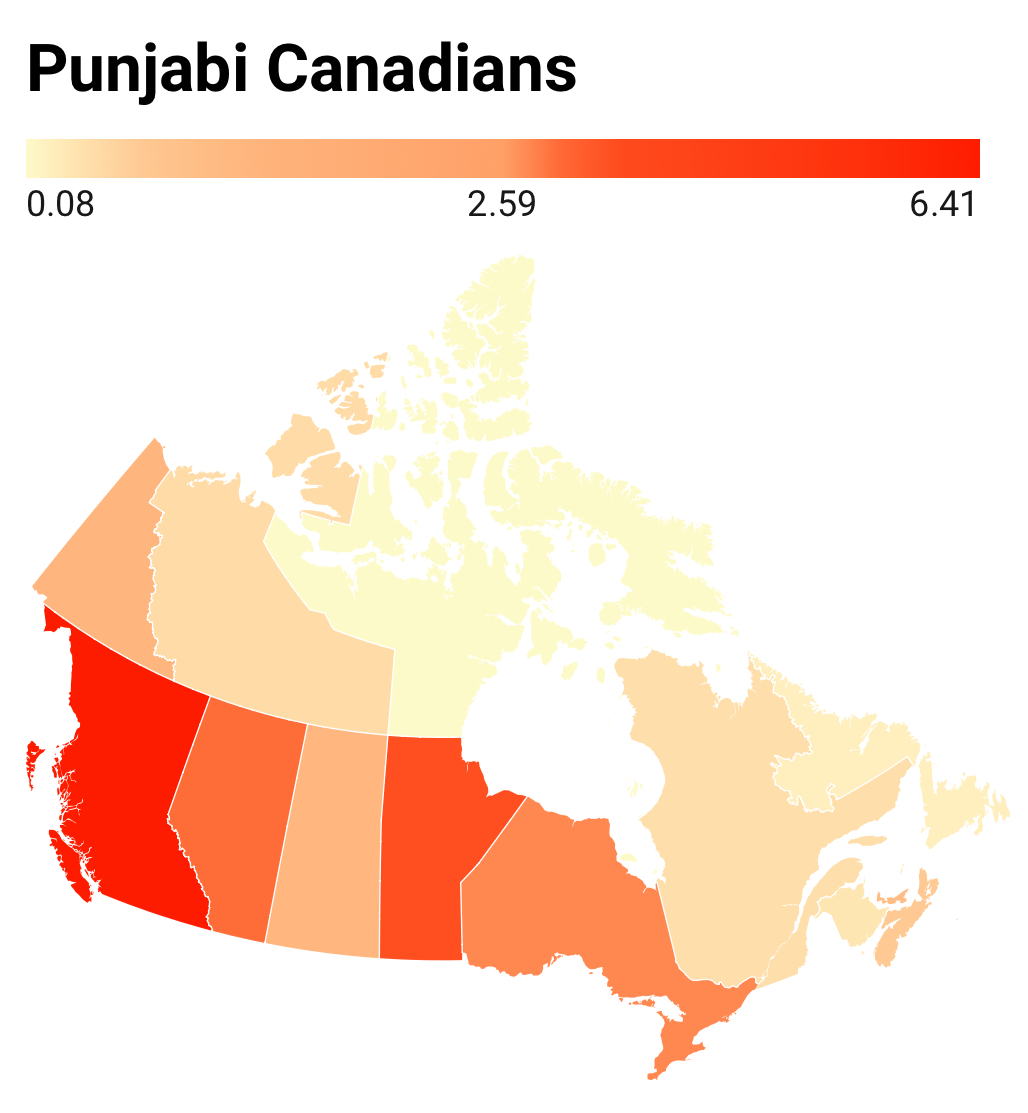
Punjabis as percent in Canada by province/territory, 2021 census

Punjabi Canadians by province and territory (1981−2021)
Province/territory	2021		2016		2011		2006		2001		1996		1991		1986		1981	
Province/territory	Pop.	%	Pop.	%	Pop.	%	Pop.	%	Pop.	%	Pop.	%	Pop.	%	Pop.	%	Pop.	%
Ontario	397,865	2.84%	282,065	2.13%	238,130	1.87%	201,720	1.68%	146,250	1.3%	99,135	0.93%	64,105	0.64%	26,280	0.29%	18,050	0.21%
British; Columbia	315,000	6.41%	244,485	5.36%	213,315	4.9%	184,590	4.53%	142,785	3.69%	112,365	3.05%	77,830	2.4%	54,075	1.88%	45,000	1.64%
Alberta	126,385	3.03%	90,485	2.27%	62,815	1.74%	44,480	1.37%	28,460	0.97%	20,660	0.77%	15,165	0.6%	8,755	0.37%	6,250	0.28%
Manitoba	42,820	3.28%	22,900	1.85%	12,555	1.05%	7,600	0.67%	6,305	0.57%	5,445	0.49%	4,150	0.38%	2,845	0.27%	1,935	0.19%
Quebec	34,290	0.41%	17,860	0.22%	14,480	0.19%	15,435	0.21%	13,050	0.18%	9,155	0.13%	4,850	0.07%	2,455	0.04%	1,510	0.02%
Saskatchewan	13,310	1.21%	8,300	0.78%	3,250	0.32%	1,210	0.13%	925	0.1%	760	0.08%	635	0.07%	555	0.05%	530	0.05%
Nova; Scotia	6,730	0.7%	1,010	0.11%	800	0.09%	625	0.07%	525	0.06%	765	0.09%	705	0.08%	285	0.03%	305	0.04%
New; Brunswick	2,475	0.33%	205	0.03%	115	0.02%	130	0.02%	135	0.02%	80	0.01%	55	0.01%	60	0.01%	100	0.01%
Prince Edward; Island	1,550	1.03%	185	0.13%	40	0.03%	15	0.01%	0	0%	30	0.02%	90	0.07%	15	0.01%	25	0.02%
Newfoundland and Labrador	1,040	0.21%	485	0.09%	115	0.02%	150	0.03%	150	0.03%	140	0.03%	235	0.04%	90	0.02%	105	0.02%
Yukon	490	1.24%	150	0.43%	105	0.31%	100	0.33%	90	0.32%	95	0.31%	50	0.18%	45	0.19%	30	0.13%
Northwest; Territories	175	0.43%	105	0.26%	30	0.07%	25	0.06%	35	0.09%	60	0.09%	65	0.11%	30	0.06%	15	0.03%
Nunavut	30	0.08%	15	0.04%	15	0.05%	10	0.03%	10	0.04%	—N/a	—N/a	—N/a	—N/a	—N/a	—N/a	—N/a	—N/a
Canada	942,170	2.59%	668,240	1.94%	545,730	1.65%	456,090	1.46%	338,715	1.14%	248,695	0.87%	167,930	0.62%	95,470	0.38%	73,810	0.3%

=== Metropolitan areas ===
According to the 2021 census, metropolitan areas with the highest proportions of Punjabi Canadians included Abbotsford–Mission (23.3%), Vancouver (9.2%), Toronto (5.2%), Winnipeg (4.9%), Calgary (4.7%), Edmonton (3.8%), Kitchener–Cambridge–Waterloo (2.8%), Regina (2.5%), Kelowna (2.2%), Hamilton (1.8%), Saskatoon (1.7%), and Victoria (1.5%).

Punjabi Canadians by metropolitan areas (2016−2021)
Metro Area	Province	2021		2016	
Metro Area	Province	Pop.	%	Pop.	%
Toronto	Ontario	318,135	5.18%	243,875	4.16%
Vancouver	British; Columbia	239,205	9.18%	187,530	7.73%
Calgary	Alberta	68,240	4.66%	51,070	3.72%
Edmonton	Alberta	53,280	3.81%	36,190	2.79%
Abbotsford– Mission	British; Columbia	44,745	23.29%	35,075	19.89%
Winnipeg	Manitoba	40,105	4.89%	21,905	2.88%
Montreal	Quebec	33,640	0.8%	17,580	0.44%
Kitchener– Cambridge– Waterloo	Ontario	16,155	2.84%	6,770	1.31%
Hamilton	Ontario	13,535	1.75%	9,270	1.26%
Ottawa– Gatineau	Ontario- Quebec	10,850	0.74%	6,440	0.5%
London	Ontario	6,225	1.16%	2,030	0.42%
Windsor	Ontario	6,100	1.47%	3,270	1.01%
Regina	Saskatchewan	6,065	2.48%	3,675	1.58%
Victoria	British; Columbia	5,980	1.54%	5,310	1.48%
Saskatoon	Saskatchewan	5,430	1.74%	3,570	1.24%
Halifax	Nova; Scotia	5,025	1.09%	815	0.2%
Kelowna	British; Columbia	4,740	2.17%	2,460	1.29%
Oshawa	Ontario	3,680	0.89%	1,715	0.46%
St. Catharines– Niagara	Ontario	3,280	0.77%	1,010	0.25%
Barrie	Ontario	1,880	0.89%	720	0.37%

=== Subdivisions ===
==== British Columbia ====
According to the 2021 census, subdivisions in British Columbia with the highest proportions of Punjabi Canadians included Surrey (29.3%), Abbotsford (27.3%), Delta (19.4%), Cawston (16.4%), Okanagan−Similkameen Subdivision A (Note: Rural region surrounding Osoyoos.) (14.9%), Okanagan−Similkameen Subdivision C (Note: Rural region surrounding Oliver.) (14.3%), Mission (8.9%), Oliver (8.4%), Squamish (5.4%), Okanagan−Similkameen Subdivision G (Note: Rural region surrounding Keremeos.) (5.4%), and New Westminster (5.1%).

- Subdivisions with Punjabi Canadian populations greater than 100 listed below.

Punjabi Canadians by subdivisions in British Columbia (2016−2021)
Subdivision	Regional District	2021		2016	
Subdivision	Regional District	Pop.	%	Pop.	%
Surrey	Metro; Vancouver	164,825	29.3%	128,515	25.12%
Abbotsford	Fraser; Valley	41,145	27.28%	32,510	23.46%
Delta	Metro; Vancouver	20,810	19.4%	14,690	14.57%
Vancouver	Metro; Vancouver	19,130	2.94%	17,960	2.91%
Burnaby	Metro; Vancouver	7,860	3.2%	6,785	2.95%
Richmond	Metro; Vancouver	7,060	3.39%	6,940	3.53%
Langley	Metro; Vancouver	5,410	4.13%	3,240	2.8%
Kelowna	Central; Okanagan	4,115	2.9%	2,080	1.68%
New; Westminster	Metro; Vancouver	3,955	5.07%	2,955	4.23%
Mission	Fraser; Valley	3,595	8.85%	2,565	6.84%
Saanich	Capital	3,700	3.2%	3,390	3.03%
Prince; George	Fraser– Fort George	2,635	3.51%	1,750	2.41%
Kamloops	Thompson– Nicola	2,285	2.42%	1,480	1.69%
Maple; Ridge	Metro; Vancouver	2,215	2.46%	1,135	1.4%
Coquitlam	Metro; Vancouver	2,060	1.4%	1,680	1.22%
Chilliwack	Fraser; Valley	1,810	1.97%	625	0.76%
Nanaimo	Nanaimo	1,640	1.69%	1,075	1.23%
Port; Coquitlam	Metro; Vancouver	1,440	2.38%	1,130	1.95%
Squamish	Squamish– Lillooet	1,280	5.44%	1,080	5.65%
Langley (City)	Metro; Vancouver	1,160	4.14%	260	1.03%
White; Rock	Metro; Vancouver	1,025	4.95%	535	2.8%
Penticton	Okanagan– Similkameen	850	2.38%	740	2.28%
Langford	Capital	670	1.45%	450	1.29%
Fort; St. John	Peace; River	645	3.05%	245	1.24%
North; Vancouver (District)	Metro; Vancouver	620	0.71%	475	0.56%
North; Vancouver (City)	Metro; Vancouver	590	1.03%	355	0.68%
Vernon	North; Okanagan	580	1.35%	550	1.42%
Victoria	Capital	575	0.65%	520	0.64%
Okanagan-Similkameen; Subdivision C	Okanagan– Similkameen	565	14.34%	540	15.45%
Pitt; Meadows	Metro; Vancouver	555	2.92%	480	2.6%
Prince; Rupert	North; Coast	485	3.98%	290	2.42%
Terrace	Kitimat– Stikine	475	4.02%	235	2.05%
North; Cowichan	Cowichan; Valley	430	1.37%	565	1.95%
Oliver	Okanagan– Similkameen	415	8.37%	385	8.22%
Williams; Lake	Cariboo	340	3.17%	310	3%
West; Kelowna	Central; Okanagan	315	0.88%	145	0.45%
Okanagan-Similkameen; Subdivision A	Okanagan– Similkameen	310	14.87%	270	14.52%
Central; Saanich	Capital	255	1.48%	225	1.37%
View; Royal	Capital	250	2.22%	425	4.29%
Osoyoos	Okanagan– Similkameen	245	4.64%	200	4.12%
Port; Alberni	Alberni– Clayoquot	240	1.34%	370	2.14%
Dawson; Creek	Peace; River	240	1.99%	170	1.44%
Quesnel	Cariboo	235	2.43%	455	4.7%
Merritt	Thompson– Nicola	235	3.49%	360	5.24%
Courtenay	Comox; Valley	230	0.83%	135	0.54%
Cranbrook	East; Kootenay	230	1.16%	60	0.31%
Campbell; River	Strathcona	225	0.64%	100	0.31%
Sechelt	Sunshine; Coast	185	1.74%	30	0.3%
Castlegar	Central; Kootenay	180	2.23%	135	1.74%
Cawston	Okanagan– Similkameen	180	16.36%	110	11.7%
Lake; Country	Central; Okanagan	175	1.12%	110	0.87%
North; Saanich	Capital	160	1.31%	30	0.27%
Summerland	Okanagan– Similkameen	155	1.33%	115	1.02%
Trail	Kootenay; Boundary	150	1.97%	15	0.2%
West; Vancouver	Metro; Vancouver	140	0.32%	135	0.32%
Okanagan-Similkameen; Subdivision G	Okanagan– Similkameen	125	5.43%	125	5.61%
Oak; Bay	Capital	120	0.68%	75	0.43%
Smithers	Bulkley– Nechako	120	2.28%	10	0.19%
Port; Moody	Metro; Vancouver	115	0.34%	135	0.4%
Nelson	Central; Kootenay	110	1.03%	35	0.34%
Salmon; Arm	Columbia– Shuswap	105	0.56%	40	0.23%

==== Prairies ====
According to the 2021 census, subdivisions in the Prairies with the highest proportions of Punjabi Canadians included Chestermere (14.7%), Winnipeg (5.3%), Edmonton (5.0%), Thompson (4.9%), Calgary (4.7%), Regina (2.7%), Airdrie (2.4%), Saskatoon (2.0%), Portage La Prairie (1.9%), Grande Prairie (1.2%), and Yorkton (1.2%).

- Subdivisions with Punjabi Canadian populations greater than 100 listed below.

Punjabi Canadians by subdivisions in the Prairies (2016−2021)
Subdivision	Province	2021		2016	
Subdivision	Province	Pop.	%	Pop.	%
Calgary	Alberta	61,205	4.74%	47,135	3.86%
Edmonton	Alberta	49,965	5.01%	34,305	3.75%
Winnipeg	Manitoba	39,215	5.32%	21,585	3.13%
Regina	Saskatchewan	5,940	2.66%	3,625	1.71%
Saskatoon	Saskatchewan	5,220	2%	3,425	1.42%
Chestermere	Alberta	3,265	14.74%	1,900	9.57%
Airdrie	Alberta	1,760	2.38%	685	1.12%
Strathcona; County	Alberta	1,045	1.07%	730	0.75%
Grande; Prairie	Alberta	760	1.2%	370	0.6%
Fort; McMurray	Alberta	725	1.07%	630	0.95%
Thompson	Manitoba	630	4.89%	415	3.08%
Brandon	Manitoba	590	1.18%	235	0.49%
Red; Deer	Alberta	585	0.6%	370	0.38%
Lethbridge	Alberta	455	0.47%	260	0.29%
Medicine; Hat	Alberta	445	0.72%	120	0.19%
Prince; Albert	Saskatchewan	415	1.15%	275	0.79%
Lloydminster	Alberta− Saskatchewan	355	1.15%	330	1.07%
Portage; La Prairie	Manitoba	240	1.87%	25	0.2%
Spruce; Grove	Alberta	235	0.63%	100	0.3%
Yorkton	Saskatchewan	190	1.19%	75	0.47%
St. Albert	Alberta	185	0.28%	175	0.27%
Leduc	Alberta	145	0.43%	215	0.73%
Moose; Jaw	Saskatchewan	140	0.42%	110	0.33%
North; Battleford	Saskatchewan	125	0.93%	30	0.22%

==== Ontario ====
According to the 2021 census, subdivisions in Ontario with the highest proportions of Punjabi Canadians included Brampton (29.1%), Caledon (15.1%), Mississauga (5.3%), Mono (5.0%), Milton (4.6%), Woodstock (4.2%), Cambridge (3.8%), Kitchener (3.2%), Brantford (3.1%), Oakville (2.6%), Ajax (2.3%), Halton Hills (2.1%), and Waterloo (2.0%).

- Subdivisions with Punjabi Canadian populations greater than 100 listed below.

Punjabi Canadians by subdivisions in Ontario (2016−2021)
Subdivision	2021		2016	
Subdivision	Pop.	%	Pop.	%
Brampton	189,235	29.11%	141,995	24.03%
Toronto	41,430	1.5%	33,785	1.26%
Mississauga	37,835	5.31%	34,345	4.8%
Caledon	11,515	15.13%	4,410	6.66%
Hamilton	10,420	1.86%	6,645	1.26%
Ottawa	10,240	1.02%	6,235	0.68%
Kitchener	8,160	3.21%	3,060	1.33%
Markham	6,095	1.81%	6,615	2.02%
Milton	6,085	4.63%	3,820	3.51%
London	5,970	1.43%	1,920	0.51%
Oakville	5,570	2.63%	3,805	1.98%
Cambridge	5,195	3.79%	2,230	1.74%
Windsor	4,125	1.82%	2,540	1.19%
Brantford	3,160	3.06%	1,665	1.74%
Ajax	2,860	2.27%	1,990	1.67%
Burlington	2,885	1.57%	2,565	1.42%
Guelph	2,775	1.96%	2,110	1.62%
Waterloo	2,370	2%	1,165	1.13%
Woodstock	1,930	4.2%	100	0.25%
Niagara; Falls	1,785	1.93%	440	0.51%
Oshawa	1,755	1.01%	650	0.41%
Barrie	1,685	1.16%	665	0.48%
Pickering	1,645	1.67%	1,445	1.59%
Whitby	1,420	1.04%	895	0.71%
Halton; Hills	1,335	2.14%	545	0.91%
Richmond; Hill	1,120	0.56%	1,365	0.7%
Sudbury	805	0.49%	175	0.11%
Kingston	745	0.58%	345	0.29%
Peterborough	550	0.67%	130	0.17%
Bellville	535	0.99%	120	0.24%
St. Catharines	515	0.38%	245	0.19%
Cornwall	510	1.1%	235	0.52%
Orangeville	465	1.57%	140	0.49%
Mono	465	4.97%	130	1.51%
Sarnia	455	0.64%	165	0.23%
Thunder; Bay	395	0.37%	95	0.09%
Sault Ste. Marie	365	0.52%	40	0.06%
Timmins	325	0.81%	15	0.04%
Chatham− Kent	310	0.3%	55	0.06%
Stratford	160	0.49%	120	0.39%

==== Quebec ====
- Subdivisions with Punjabi Canadian populations greater than 100 listed below.

Punjabi Canadians by subdivisions in Quebec (2016−2021)
Subdivision	2021		2016	
Subdivision	Pop.	%	Pop.	%
Montreal	22,580	1.31%	10,615	0.64%
Laval	3,595	0.84%	2,495	0.61%
Vaudreuil– Dorion	1,980	4.7%	885	2.39%
Dollard–des– Ormeaux	1,855	3.87%	1,400	2.9%
Brossard	675	0.76%	605	0.72%
Gatineau	345	0.12%	155	0.06%

==== Atlantic ====
Punjabi Canadians by subdivisions in Atlantic Canada (2016−2021)
Subdivision	Province	2021		2016	
Subdivision	Province	Pop.	%	Pop.	%
Halifax	Nova; Scotia	4,965	1.14%	815	0.21%

==== North ====
- Subdivisions with Punjabi Canadian populations greater than 100 listed below.

Punjabi Canadians by subdivisions in Northern Canada (2016−2021)
Subdivision	Province	2021		2016	
Subdivision	Province	Pop.	%	Pop.	%
Whitehorse	Yukon	455	1.64%	140	0.57%
Yellowknife	Northwest; Territories	150	0.75%	90	0.47%

== Notable people ==
=== Academics ===
- Hardial Singh Bains, microbiologist
- Harjot Singh Oberoi, academic
- Munir Sheikh, economist
- Naranjan Singh Dhalla, scientist
- Naweed Syed, scientist
- Sajida Alvi, academic
- Sandeep Singh Brar, academic
- Sat Bir Singh Khalsa, academic
- Sheena Iyengar, academic

=== Activists ===
- Darshan Singh Canadian, trade unionist and communist organizer
- Harmeet Singh Sooden, anti-war activist
- Jaggi Singh, anti-globalization activist
- Mewa Singh, assassin, anti-British Colonialism activist, Azad Punjab(Free Punjab) Movement Ghadarite

=== Athletes ===
- Andrew Singh Kooner, boxer
- Akam, professional wrestler
- Amarveer Singh Dhesi, wrestling gold medalist
- Arjun Singh Bhullar, wrestler and mixed martial artist
- Arjun Gill, wrestling gold medalist
- Arshdeep Bains, ice hockey player
- Balraj Panesar, field hockey player
- The Bollywood Boyz, Gurv Singh and Harv Singh Sihra, professional wrestling tag team
- Haninder Dhillon, cricket player
- Harinder Jit Singh Rai, field hockey player
- Harpal Singh Talhan, boxer
- Jasvir Rakkar, baseball player
- Jasvir Singh, weightlifter
- Jimmy Hansra, cricket player
- Shaan Hundal, soccer player
- Jinder Mahal, professional wrestler
- Jujhar Khaira, ice hockey player
- Kenny Singh Lally, Boxing bronze medalist
- Manny Malhotra, retired ice hockey player and current coach
- Nick Sandhu, former field hockey player
- Nicolas Gill, judoko
- Nishan Singh Randhawa, wrestling gold medalist
- Nuvraj Bassi, football player
- Obby Khan, former football player
- Paul Chohan, former field hockey player
- Qaiser Ali, cricket player
- Robin Bawa, ice hockey player, first Indo-Canadian in the NHL
- Rizwan Cheema, cricket player
- Saad Bin Zafar, cricket player
- Sim Bhullar, basketball player
- Sukh Chungh, football player
- Sukhdeep Singh Chakria, boxer
- Sukhi Panesar, field hockey player
- Tiger Ali Singh, professional wrestler
- Tiger Jeet Singh, professional wrestler
- Umar Bhatti, cricket player
- Yogi Singh Johl, Olympic wrestler

=== Businesspeople ===
- Nav Bhatia, businessman
- Baljit Singh Chadha, businessman
- Harbanse Singh Doman, industrialist
- Manjit Minhas, entrepreneur, Dragon's Den panelist
- Spoony Singh, entrepreneur
- Suneet Singh Tuli, tech entrepreneur

=== Criminals ===
- Jaspal Atwal, attempted assassin of Malkiat Singh Sidhu
- Ranjit Cheema, gangster
- Bindy Johal, gangster
- Gurmit Singh Dhak, gangster

=== Film and television ===
- Neeru Bajwa, Pollywood actress
- Rubina Bajwa, Pollywood actress
- Parveen Kaur, actress
- Karam Singh Batth, Pollywood actor and producer
- Rupan Bal, Pollywood actor, director, producer and YouTube personality
- Vekeana Dhillon, Pollywood screenwriter and series creator
- Vikram Dhillon, filmmaker and producer
- Balinder Johal, actress
- Deepa Mehta, film director
- Omar Majeed, film director and producer
- Zarqa Nawaz, film director/producer and author
- Alex Sangha, social worker and documentary film producer
- Zaib Shaikh, actor
- Jasmeet Singh, comedian
- Veena Sood, actress
- Lilly Singh, comedian
- Supinder Wraich, actress
- Sunny Leone, Bollywood and adult actress

=== Journalists ===
- Suroosh Alvi, journalist and filmmaker
- Monika Deol, VJ and news anchor
- Tara Singh Hayer, newspaper publisher
- Tarek Fatah, journalist
- Monita Rajpal, journalist
- Ali Amjad Rizvi, journalist and political activist
- Harnarayan Singh, journalist and sports announcer
- Adnan Virk, sports announcer

=== Musicians ===
- Jazzy B, singer
- Karan Aujla, singer
- AP Dhillon, singer
- Harbhajan Mann, singer, actor, film producer
- Nav, rapper and singer
- Fateh, rapper
- Shubh, singer
- Sukha, rapper
- Humble the Poet, rapper
- Jonita Gandhi, singer
- Qurram Hussain, singer
- Nimrat Khaira, singer
- Rup Magon, singer-songwriter
- Musarrat Nazir, singer/actress

=== Politicians ===
- Amarjeet Singh Sohi, Mayor of Edmonton, former federal Minister of Natural Resources
- Anita Anand, MP for Oakville, cabinet minister
- Anju Dhillon, MP for Dorval—Lachine—LaSalle
- Bardish Chagger, MP for Waterloo, cabinet minister
- Bob Saroya, MP for Markham—Unionville
- Deepak Anand, politician MPP for Mississauga-Malton
- Gagan Sikand, MP for Mississauga-Streetsville
- Gurbax Singh Malhi, former MP for Bramalea—Gore—Malton, first turban-wearing Sikh elected to a national legislature in the Western world
- Gurmant Grewal, former MP for Newton—North Delta
- Gurratan Singh, MPP for Brampton East
- Harinder Takhar former MPP for Mississauga—Erindale, former cabinet minister
- Harjit Sajjan, MP for Vancouver South, cabinet minister
- Harry Bains, MLA for Surrey-Newton
- Herb Dhaliwal, former MP for Vancouver South, cabinet minister
- Iqra Khalid, MP for Mississauga—Erin Mills
- Jag Sahota, MP for Calgary Skyview
- Jagmeet Singh, MP for Burnaby South, leader of the New Democratic Party
- Jas Johal, former MLA for Richmond-Queensborough
- Jasbir Sandhu, former MP for Surrey North
- Johnder Basran, former mayor of Lillooet, British Columbia, first Indo-Canadian mayor
- Kamal Khera, MP for Brampton West
- Kash Heed, former police chief and MLA for Vancouver-Fraserview
- Ruby Dhalla, former MP for Brampton—Springdale
- Maninder Sidhu, MP for Brampton East
- Manmeet Bhullar, MLA for Calgary-Greenway
- Mintu Sandhu, MLA for The Maples
- Moe Sihota, former MLA for Esquimalt-Metchosin, first Indo-Canadian elected to a provincial legislature
- Nina Grewal, former MP for Fleetwood—Port Kells
- Navdeep Bains, MP for Mississauga—Malton, cabinet minister
- Parm Gill, MPP for Milton
- Peter Sandhu, former MLA for Edmonton Manning
- Peter Singh, MLA for Calgary-East
- Raj Grewal, former MP for Brampton East
- Raj Saini, MP for Kitchener Centre
- Rachna Singh, MLA for Surrey-Green Timbers
- Ramesh Sangha, MP for Brampton Centre
- Ruby Sahota, MP for Brampton North
- Sara Singh, MPP for Brampton Centre
- Sukh Dhaliwal, MP for Surrey—Newton
- Shafiq Qaadri, former MPP for Etobicoke North
- Sonia Sidhu, MP for Brampton South
- Tim Uppal, MP for Edmonton Mill Woods, former cabinet minister
- Ujjal Dosanjh, former MP for Vancouver South, former MLA for Vancouver-Kensington, former premier of British Columbia, first Indo-Canadian premier
- Wajid Khan, former MP for Mississauga—Streetsville
- Wally Oppal, former MLA for Vancouver-Fraserview

=== Writers and Authors ===
- Gurjinder Basran, novelist
- H. S. Bhabra, writer
- Navtej Bharati, poet
- Ranj Dhaliwal, novelist
- Rupinder Gill, writer and humourist
- Rupi Kaur, author and poet
- Rukhsana Khan, writer
- Shaun Mehta, writer
- Muhammad Tahir-ul-Qadri, writer

=== Other ===
- Buckam Singh, former soldier

== See also ==
- Indo-Canadians
- Pakistani Canadians
- Indo-Canadian organized crime
