= List of Canadian Sikhs =

List of Sikhs from Canada

This list of Canadian Sikhs is a list of notable Sikhs from Canada.

== Academia and education ==
- Harjot Oberoi — Professor of Asian Studies at the University of British Columbia
- Sandeep Singh Brar — Sikh historian, internet pioneer, and photographer
- Sat Bir Singh Khalsa — researcher specializing in yoga therapy
- Naranjan Dhalla — Cardiovascular research scientist and Distinguished Professor at the University of Manitoba

== Business and private sector ==
- Jaspal Atwal — businessman in real-estate construction and media
- Navdeep Bains — Vice-Chair, Global Investment Banking at CIBC, and former politician
- Nav Bhatia — businessman and superfan of the Toronto Raptors
- Baljit Singh Chadha — president and founder of Balcorp Limited, and former member of the Security Intelligence Review Committee
- Harbanse Singh Doman — forester, industrialist, and Chairman of Doman Industries
- Manjit Minhas — entrepreneur, television personality, and co-founder of Minhas Breweries & Distillery
- Spoony Singh — businessman, known for establishing the Hollywood Wax Museum
- Suneet Singh Tuli — tech entrepreneur

== Non-profit ==
- Alex Sangha — social worker, documentary film producer, and Founder of Sher Vancouver

== Entertainment ==
- Rupan Bal — YouTuber, actor, director, and comedian
- Ian Bawa — filmmaker
- Neeru Bajwa — actress, director, and producer associated with Punjabi-language cinema
- Humble the Poet (Kanwer Singh) — spoken word artist, writer, and YouTube personality
- Jus Reign (Jasmeet Singh Raina) — comedian and YouTube personality
- Amrit Kaur — actress
- Parveen Kaur — actress
- Sunny Leone — actress and model
- Lilly Singh — YouTuber, comedian, television host, and actress

=== Music ===
- Fateh — rapper/singer
- Byg Byrd — Punjabi music producer and CEO of Brown Boys
- Gurinder Gill — rapper and singer
- Harbhajan Mann — Punjabi singer, actor, and film producer
- Jazzy B (Jaswinder Singh Bains) — bhangra singer-songwriter
- Rup Magon — singer-songwriter, producer, actor and author
- Sarbjit Cheema — singer and actor
- Shinda Kahlon (Satinderpal Singh Kahlon) — rapper, singer-songwriter
- Shubh (Shubhneet Singh) – Punjabi-Canadian singer
- Gagan Singh – film score composer
- Sunny Malton (Sandeep Singh Sidhu) — rapper and singer
- NAV (Navraj Singh Goraya) — rapper
- Karan Aujla (Jaskaran Singh Aujla) - punjabi rapper

== Journalism and writing ==
- Gurjinder Basran — novelist
- Monika Deol — entertainment reporter for Citytv in Toronto
- Ranj Dhaliwal — author
- Tara Singh Hayer — newspaper publisher
- Rupi Kaur — poet, writer, illustrator, and performer
- Monita Rajpal — CNN International news anchor
- Harnarayan Singh — television sportscaster
- Harsha Walia

== Politics ==
- Amarjeet Sohi — Former Mayor of Edmonton, former Member of Parliament (MP), former Minister of Natural Resources
- Anju Dhillon — Former MP of Dorval—Lachine—LaSalle and first person of South Asian descent to be elected from the province of Quebec.
- Baljit Singh Gosal — Former MP of Bramalea—Gore—Malton, and former Minister of Sport
- Bardish Chagger — Former MP of Waterloo
- Bob Saroya — Former MP of Markham—Unionville
- Darshan Kang — Former Member of the Canadian Parliament for Calgary Skyview
- Gulzar Singh Cheema — Former MP & former member of the British Columbia Legislative Assembly for Surrey-Panorama Ridge
- George Chahal — former MP of Calgary Skyview
- Gurbax Singh Malhi — former MP for Bramalea—Gore—Malton
- Gurmant Grewal — MP for Newton—North Delta
- Gurratan Singh — Former Member of the Ontario Provincial Parliament (MPP) for Brampton East
- Hardial Bains — Founder of the Communist Party of Canada (Marxist–Leninist)
- Hardeep Grewal — MPP of Brampton East
- Harjit Sajjan — Minister of International Development, Minister Responsible for PacifiCan, and MP of Vancouver South
- Harry Bains — Minister of Labour in British Columbia
- Harinder Takhar — Former politician in Ontario, Canada
- Herb Dhaliwal — Former MP of Vancouver South.
- Iqwinder Gaheer — MP of Mississauga—Malton
- Jagmeet Singh — Former leader of the New Democratic Party and MP for Burnaby South
- Jag Sahota — Former MP of Calgary Skyview
- Jasraj Hallan — MP for Calgary Forest Lawn
- Johnder Basran — Former Mayor of Lillooet, BC, and the first Indo-Canadian to be elected to a mayoral office in Canada
- Kamal Khera — MP of Brampton West
- Kuldip Kular — Former MPP in Ontario
- Manmeet Bhullar — Former Member of the Legislative Assembly of Alberta
- Maninder Sidhu — MP of Brampton East
- Mintu Sandhu — MLA for The Maples
- Moe Sihota — Former President of the British Columbia New Democratic Party
- Navdeep Bains — Former MP and Minister of Innovation, Science and Economic Development
- Nina Grewal — MP for Fleetwood—Port Kells
- Parm Bains — MP for Steveston—Richmond East
- Parm Gill — MPP of Milton and former MP for Brampton—Springdale
- Prabmeet Sarkaria — Current President of the Treasury Board of Ontario, MPP for Brampton South, former Associate Minister of Small Business and Red Tape Reduction, and the first turban-wearing Sikh Cabinet minister in Ontario.
- Raminder Gill — Member of the Legislative Assembly of Ontario
- Ramesh Sangha — Former MP for Brampton Centre
- Randeep Sarai — MP for Surrey Centre
- Ravi Kahlon — Parliamentary Secretary for Sport and Multiculturalism of British Columbia
- Ruby Dhalla — First Sikh women to serve in the House of Commons of Canada.
- Ruby Sahota — MP of Brampton North
- Sabi Marwah — Member of the Canadian Senate
- Sonia Sidhu — MP of Brampton South
- Sara Singh — Deputy Leader of the Ontario New Democratic Party
- Sindi Hawkins — MLA for Kelowna-Mission, BC
- Sukh Dhaliwal — MP for Surrey—Newton
- Tim Uppal — Current Deputy Leader of the Conservative Party of Canada, Minister of State (Multiculturalism), and MP for Edmonton Mill Woods
- Ujjal Dosanjh — 33rd Premier of British Columbia
- Vic Dhillon — Liberal member of the Legislative Assembly of Ontario
- Wally Oppal — Former MLA for Vancouver-Fraserview

== Military and activism ==
- Mewa Singh Lopoke — Member of the Vancouver branch of the anti-British, revolutionary Ghadar Party
- Darshan Singh Canadian — trade unionist and communist organizer
- Harmeet Singh Sooden — anti-war activist
- Sundar Singh — activist on behalf of South Asians

Sikh Canadian soldiers in World War I

- Buckam Singh — most well-known Sikh-Canadian soldier of World War I, and early Sikh pioneer of BC and Ontario.
- John Baboo (May 27, 1888 – July 9, 1948) — Punjabi-born Winnipegger who was wounded at Vimy Ridge. His prior service included 4 years with the 28th Cavalry in Madras, India. He died in the Veterans Hospital in Victoria, BC.
- Sunta Gougersingh (January 1, 1881 – October 19, 1915) — enlisted in Montréal and served with the 24th Battalion of Québec. He was killed in action 19 October 1915, and was buried in West-Vlaanderen, Belgium.
- Hari Singh (b. June 6, 1882) — Punjabi-born Torontonian who served with the 75th Reserve Battalion, Royal Canadian Dragoons. Prior service included 3 years with the 5th Bombay Cavalry of Sindham.
- Harnom Singh (alias Harry Robson; b. July 4, 1888) — of Chilliwack, BC, possibly born in Juarez, Mexico. His parents were possibly from Singapore and India. He served in the 143rd Railway Construction Battalion.
- John Singh (b. December 13, 1880) — Indian-born Winnipegger who served in the 108th Battalion.
- Lashman Singh (b. January 15, 1885) — enlisted at Smiths Falls, Ontario, served with the 75th Battalion, and was killed in action on 24 October 1918.
- Ram Singh (b. December 3, 1888) — of Grand Forks, BC, born in Punjab, India. He enlisted in Vancouver and served with the Private Army Canadian Infantry 1st Depot Battalion, British Columbia Regiment.
- Sewa Singh (b. June 7, 1890) — of Vancouver, born in Dinjutah, India. He served with the 1st Canadian Reserves Battalion.
- Waryam Singh (b. January 23, 1883) — enlisted at Smiths Falls, Ontario, and served with the 38th Battalion, Eastern Ontario Regiment.

== Sports ==
- Arjan Bhullar — Mixed martial artist currently signed to ONE Championship
- Arshdeep Bains — ice hockey left winger playing for the Abbotsford Canucks, and Draft Prospect of the Vancouver Canucks
- Jimmy Hansra — Cricketer
- Jinder Mahal — Professional wrestler currently signed to WWE
- Jujhar Khaira — Professional NHL player for Chicago Blackhawks
- Nuvraj Singh Bassi — Former defensive tackle in the Canadian Football League
- Robin Bawa — Former NHL player
- Sim Bhullar — Professional basketball player for Guangxi Rhino
- Tiger Ali Singh (Gurjit Singh Hans) — Professional wrestler, best known for his appearances in the WWF from 1997 to 2002.
- Tiger Jeet Singh (Jagjeet Singh Hans) — Semi-retired professional wrestler; father of Tiger Ali Singh.
- Yogi Johl (Herbinder Singh Johl) — Wrestler who, at the 1996 Summer Olympics, became the first Canadian of the Sikh religion and of Punjabi descent to represent Canada at the Olympic games.

== Crime and cause célèbre ==
- Jaswinder Kaur Sidhu — Beautician
- T. Sher Singh — Former lawyer
- Bindy Johal — Gangster and drug trafficker from British Columbia
- Ranjit Cheema — Vancouver-based gangster and drug trafficker
- Gurmit Singh Dhak — Gangster

== See also ==
- Sikhism in Canada
- Sikhism in Greater Vancouver
- Anti-Sikh sentiment in Canada
- List of Sikhs
- List of British Sikhs
