= Kesur Singh =

First Sikh settler in Canada

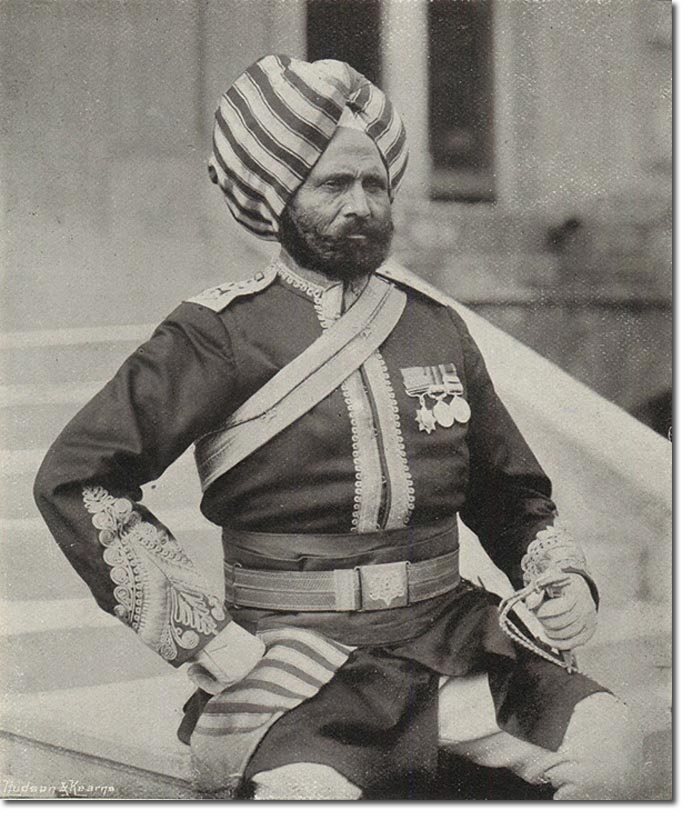
Photograph of Kesur Singh [Risaldar-Major] of the 5th Punjab Cavalry, published in The Navy and Army Illustrated, 10 December 1897

Kesur Singh was a Risaldar Major in the British Indian Army who is credited as being the first Sikh settler in Canada. Singh was amongst a group of Cavalry officers who sailed from Hong Kong to Vancouver on board Empress of India arriving in May 1897 on their way to London for the Queen Victoria's Diamond Jubilee.

Singh was an officer of the 5th Cavalry who received a medal and clasp for the Jowaki Expedition of 1877-78, as well as a medal with two clasps for Afghanistan (1878-80), where "he was specially commended for devotion and courage on several occasions, and for which he received the Order of Merit and a special certificate from Lord Roberts for his work at Sherpur.

== Legacy ==
In 1997, the centenary of Singh's visit was marked with celebrations across Canada.

In 2015, the Government of British Columbia announced that the 1874 Red Ensign flag would be permanently installed inside the B.C. Parliament Buildings in dedication to Singh. This version of the Canadian flag would have flown over government buildings when he made his historic arrival in Canada.

== See also ==
- Sikhism in Canada
- Buckam Singh
