= Rutland, British Columbia =

Neighbourhood in Kelowna, British Columbia

Rutland
- Neighbourhood
- Winter Afternoon in Chichester Wetland Park Winter Afternoon in Chichester Wetland Park
- Location within British Columbia
- Coordinates: 49°54′N 119°23′W
- Country: Canada
- Province: British Columbia
- Regional district: Central Okanagan
- City: Kelowna
- Website: https://rutlandresidentsassociation.ca/

Rutland is a neighbourhood of the City of Kelowna in the Okanagan region of the Southern Interior of British Columbia, Canada, located on the northeast edge of the city's core. Nearby neighbourhoods include Dilworth, Belgo, Black Mountain, Toovey Heights, Hall Road, Ellison, Central City, and Southeast Kelowna. It is a member of the Osoyoos Division Yale Land District.

Rutland is Kelowna's largest neighbourhood by far. Rutland has a population of 34,800 and the median age is 39.2. The neighbourhood is mostly residential, but also has a thriving business community and Kelowna City council is working with community groups to make plans for revitalisation of Rutland Town Centre.

== History ==
Rutland was an unincorporated town until it was amalgamated with the nearby city of Kelowna in 1973 by an act of the provincial legislature.

Rutland is named for an early settler, John "Hope" Matthew Rutland. Rutland, who had previously lived at Australian, near Quesnel, farmed wheat, planted the first commercial orchards, and installed the first large irrigation system in the area. In the 1900s he sold his land to a syndicate which subdivided the land and adjacent land and named the district after him. The post office was opened on October 1, 1908.

== Demographics ==
Population history
| Year | Pop. | ±% |
|---|---|---|
| 1986 | 17,748 | — |
| 1991 | 20,375 | +14.8% |
| 1996 | 22,856 | +12.2% |
| 2001 | 23,978 | +4.9% |
| 2006 | 24,906 | +3.9% |
| 2011 | 26,349 | +5.8% |
| 2016 | 27,370 | +3.9% |
| 2021 | 28,814 | +5.3% |
Source: Statistics Canada

Panethnic groups in Rutland (1991−2021)
| Panethnic group | 2021 census | | 2016 census | | 2011 census | | 2006 census | | 2001 census | | 1996 census | | 1991 census | |
| Panethnic group | Pop. | % | Pop. | % | Pop. | % | Pop. | % | Pop. | % | Pop. | % | Pop. | % |
|---|---|---|---|---|---|---|---|---|---|---|---|---|---|---|
| European (Note: Statistic includes all persons that did not make up part of a visible minority or an indigenous identity.) | 20,320 | 71.81% | 20,960 | 78.19% | 21,515 | 83.42% | 20,735 | 84.79% | 21,395 | 90.56% | 20,520 | 90.42% | 17,835 | 88.45% |
| South Asian | 2,580 | 9.12% | 1,355 | 5.06% | 1,195 | 4.63% | 735 | 3.01% | 720 | 3.05% | 780 | 3.44% | 340 | 1.69% |
| Indigenous | 2,190 | 7.74% | 2,210 | 8.24% | 1,940 | 7.52% | 1,425 | 5.83% | 700 | 2.96% | 665 | 2.93% | 1,110 | 5.5% |
| Southeast Asian (Note: Statistic includes total responses of "Filipino" and "Southeast Asian" under visible minority section on census.) | 1,200 | 4.24% | 725 | 2.7% | 345 | 1.34% | 565 | 2.31% | 235 | 0.99% | 135 | 0.59% | 230 | 1.14% |
| East Asian (Note: Statistic includes total responses of "Chinese", "Korean", and "Japanese" under visible minority section on census.) | 710 | 2.51% | 745 | 2.78% | 600 | 2.33% | 575 | 2.35% | 375 | 1.59% | 220 | 0.97% | 325 | 1.61% |
| African | 545 | 1.93% | 295 | 1.1% | 75 | 0.29% | 115 | 0.47% | 90 | 0.38% | 115 | 0.51% | 55 | 0.27% |
| Latin American | 355 | 1.25% | 200 | 0.75% | 65 | 0.25% | 245 | 1% | 110 | 0.47% | 135 | 0.59% | 170 | 0.84% |
| Middle Eastern (Note: Statistic includes total responses of "West Asian" and "Arab" under visible minority section on census.) | 230 | 0.81% | 185 | 0.69% | 0 | 0% | 10 | 0.04% | 0 | 0% | 90 | 0.4% | 80 | 0.4% |
| Other/multiracial (Note: Statistic includes total responses of "Visible minority, n.i.e." and "Multiple visible minorities" under visible minority section on census.) | 165 | 0.58% | 130 | 0.48% | 55 | 0.21% | 50 | 0.2% | 0 | 0% | 35 | 0.15% | 20 | 0.1% |
| Total responses | 28,295 | 98.2% | 26,805 | 97.94% | 25,790 | 97.88% | 24,455 | 98.19% | 23,625 | 98.53% | 22,695 | 99.3% | 20,165 | 98.97% |
| Total population | 28,814 | 100% | 27,370 | 100% | 26,349 | 100% | 24,906 | 100% | 23,978 | 100% | 22,856 | 100% | 20,375 | 100% |
Note: Totals greater than 100% due to multiple origin responses

== Notable people ==
- Johnder Basran, politician and businessman
