= Sikhs: Legacy of the Punjab =

Sikhs: Legacy of the Punjab was a temporary exhibition at the Smithsonian Institution’s National Museum of Natural History that explored the art, culture, and history of the Sikh people. The exhibition opened to the public on July 24, 2004, and formed part of the broader Smithsonian Sikh Heritage Project, which was launched in 2000. After its initial presentation in Washington, D.C., the exhibition traveled to additional venues in California and Texas.

The exhibition featured more than 100 objects related to Sikh history and culture, including artifacts dating back to the 18th century, many of which had previously been held in private collections and had not been publicly displayed. The exhibit also included historical photographs, two of which were taken by Sikh historian and photographer Sandeep Singh Brar, prominently depicting the Darbar Sahib (Golden Temple). Among the displayed materials was a copy of the Guru Granth Sahib associated with World War I.
