= Cheema Kalan =

- Village
- Location in Punjab, India Cheema Kalan (India)
- Coordinates: 31°07′44.84″N 75°52′02.61″E
- Country: India
- State: Punjab
- District: Jalandhar
- Tehsil: Phillaur

Government
  - Type: Panchayat raj
  - Body: Gram panchayat

Area
  - Total: 370 ha (910 acres)

Population (2011)
  - Total: 1,465; 751/714 ♂/♀
  - Scheduled Castes: 583; 299/284 ♂/♀
  - Total Households: 326

Languages
  - Official: Punjabi
- Time zone: UTC+5:30 (IST)
- Telephone: 01826
- ISO 3166 code: IN-PB
- Vehicle registration: PB-37
- Website: jalandhar.gov.in

Cheema Kalan is a village in Phillaur in Jalandhar district of Punjab State, India. In the Persian language, Kalan is translated as 'big' and Khurd as 'small'. Cheema Kalan is situated beside Cheema Khurd. It is located 20 kilometres (12 mi) from the sub district headquarter and 28 kilometres (17 mi) from district headquarter. The village is administrated by Sarpanch, an elected representative of the village.

== Demography ==
As of 2011, the village has a total number of 326 houses and a population of 1465 of which 751 are males while 714 are females. According to the report published by Census India in 2011, out of the total population of the village 583 people are from Schedule Caste and the village does not have any Schedule Tribe population so far.

== See also ==
- List of villages in India
