= Cheema Khurd =

- Village
- Location in Punjab, India Cheema Khurd (India)
- Coordinates: 31°07′29.90″N 75°51′33.97″E
- Country: India
- State: Punjab
- District: Jalandhar
- Tehsil: Phillaur

Government
  - Type: Panchayat raj
  - Body: Gram panchayat

Area
  - Total: 271 ha (670 acres)

Population (2011)
  - Total: 1,105; 550/555 ♂/♀
  - Scheduled Castes: 521; 262/259 ♂/♀
  - Total Households: 240

Languages
  - Official: Punjabi
- Time zone: UTC+5:30 (IST)
- Telephone: 01826
- ISO 3166 code: IN-PB
- Vehicle registration: PB-37
- Website: jalandhar.gov.in

Cheema Khurd is a village in Phillaur in Jalandhar district of Punjab State, India. In the Persian language, Kalan is translated as 'big' and Khurd as 'small'. Cheema Khurd is situated beside Cheema Kalan. It is located 3 kilometres (1.9 mi) from the sub district headquarter and 29 kilometres (18 mi) from district headquarter. The village is administrated by Sarpanch, an elected representative of the village.

== Demography ==
As of 2011, the village has 240 houses and a population of 1105 of which 550 are males while 555 are females. According to the report published by Census India in 2011, out of the total population of the village 521 people are from Schedule Caste and the village does not have any Schedule Tribe population so far. Dutch international cricketer Vikramjit Singh was born in the village.

== Notable people ==
- Vikramjit Singh – Netherlands Cricketer
- Ranjit Cheema, Canadian gangster

== See also ==
- List of villages in India
