= Sandeep Singh Brar =

Sikh historian and photographer

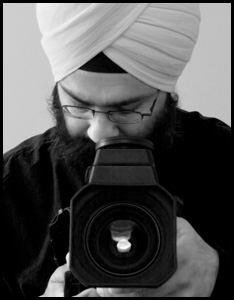
- Born: Kisumu, Kenya, Africa
- Website: www.sikhs.org www.sikhmuseum.com www.singhbrar.com/photos/

Sandeep Singh Brar is a Sikh historian, internet pioneer and photographer.

== Biography ==
He is the creator of the world's first Sikh website, sikhs.org, which was launched in December 1994. The website consisted mostly of bulletin boards where discussions on topics such as hair-cutting, meat-consumption, caste, conflicts between Punjabi culture and Sikhism, Sikh & non-Sikh relations, gender, and other matters were discussed. The website featured news stories related to diasporic Sikhs, offering a central hub for the collection of these articles. In September 1995, The Sikhism Home Page was included into the Microsoft Encarta Encyclopedia, and continues to be one of the mostly highly referenced sources of information about the Sikh religion.

He is also the first person to put the Sikh Scriptures on the Internet with the full English translation of The Guru Granth Sahib by Dr. Sant Singh Khalsa and first to put the Sikh Code of Conduct - The Sikh Rehat Maryada on the Internet. In addition to this site, Sandeep Singh Brar is also the creator of the SikhMuseum.com website, whose purpose is to preserve the heritage of the Sikh people in a way that is accessible to all.

In 2008, Sandeep Singh was responsible for uncovering the history and life of Private Buckam Singh, one of only a handful of Sikh soldiers that served in the Canadian military during World War I. It was the acquisition of a forgotten World War I medal that prompted Sandeep Singh to research its ownership, thus bringing to light the story of the brave Canadian Sikh. A ceremony was held at Buckam Singh's grave in Kitchener, Ontario on November 11 (Remembrance Day) to commemorate his service and life.

== Exhibitions ==
In addition to being a historian, Sandeep Singh is also a noted photographer whose works have been featured in a number of exhibits:

- 1999: Metro Toronto Convention Centre Centennial Foundation Gala Solo exhibit of photographs
- 2004–2007: Smithsonian Institution, Washington D.C. Sikhs: Legacy of the Punjab Photographs incorporated as part of the exhibit
- September 2006 – January 2007: Rubin Museum of Art, New York I See No Stranger: Early Sikh Art and Devotion Photographs incorporated as part of the exhibit

== See also ==
- Sikhism
- Sikhs: Legacy of the Punjab
