= Naranjan Dhalla =

Canadian medical researcher

Naranjan S. Dhalla
- Born: October 10, 1936 (age 89); Ghanieke, Punjab, India
- Citizenship: Canadian
- Education: Panjab University, Chandigarh; University of Pennsylvania
- Awards: Order of Canada; Order of Manitoba
- Scientific career
- Fields: Cardiovascular research

Naranjan S. Dhalla, CM OM FRSC (born October 10, 1936) is a Canadian cardiovascular research scientist focusing on cardiovascular pathophysiology and therapy of heart disease. His laboratory employs a variety of experimental models to investigate a wide range of cardiovascular diseases at the subcellular and molecular levels.

== History ==
Born in Ghanieke, Punjab, India, he received a Bachelor of Science in Physics and Chemistry from Panjab University in 1956, an A.I.C. in Chemistry from the Institution of Chemists in Calcutta, India in 1961, a Master of Science in Pharmacology from University of Pennsylvania in 1963, and a Ph.D. in Pharmacology from University of Pennsylvania in 1965. In 1968, he joined the University of Manitoba as an assistant professor in physiology. In 1972, he became an associate professor and a full professor in 1974. In 1991, he was appointed a distinguished professor of physiology.

From 1996 to 2006, he was the director of St. Boniface Hospital Research Centre's Institute of Cardiovascular Sciences. He last served as executive director of the International Academy of Cardiovascular Sciences.

Dhalla also served the International Society for Heart Research as secretary general from 1972 to 1988, and as president elect, president, and past president from 1989 to 1998. He is credited for expanding the reach of the ISHR by establishing chapters in Russia, China, Japan, India, South America and in many other countries of the world.

== Awards and honors ==
In 1996, he was awarded Manitoba's Order of the Buffalo Hunt and the Order of Manitoba in 2002. In 1997, he was made a member of the Order of Canada, Canada's highest civilian honour, for having "distinguished himself in the field of cardiovascular research". In 2000, he was made a fellow of the Royal Society of Canada. In 2007, he was granted heraldic arms from the Canadian Heraldic Authority with the motto "Satayam Shivam Sundaram" or "Truth Purity Beauty". In 2009, Dhalla was awarded an honorary doctorate from Panjab University, Chandigarh, India. In 2019 he was inducted into the Canadian Medical Hall of Fame.

== Sources ==
- "PUBLIC REGISTER OF ARMS, FLAGS AND BADGES".
- "CITIZENS HALL OF FAME DR. NARANJAN DHALLA".
- "Naranjan S Dhalla". University of Manitoba.
- "Naranjan S Dhalla". University of Manitoba. Archived from the original on November 28, 2005.
- "Canadian Who's Who 1997 entry". University of Toronto Press.
