= Johnder Basran =

Johnder Basran (July 13, 1930 – December 29, 2013) was the first Indo-Canadian elected to mayoral office in Canada, in the town of Lillooet in the Fraser Canyon region of the Interior of British Columbia, Canada. Described in the local newspaper's obituary as one of the town's biggest boosters and greatest ambassadors, he also served as chairman of the local school board.

== Early life and career ==
Basran was born in Kelowna on 13 July 1930, the third child of Bhagat Singh and Udham Kaur Basran. He grew up on an orchard and cattle ranch operation in Rutland, now part of the City of Kelowna. A Costco store now stands where the family home was. Basran attended school in Kelowna and Rutland.

Basran and his wife Mary were the first to marry at the Abbotsford Sikh Temple in non-traditional western wedding attire. He operated a Chevron station on Highway 33 (which leads up to the Big White Ski Resort and then on south to Rock Creek in the Boundary Country) and from that start expanded into heavy equipment work around the Okanagan and also in the Kootenay region.

Basran moved to Lillooet in 1959 with his family and established Lillooet Timber with his father-in-law. For many years, his gas station and garage business, Basran Sales and Service, was a fixture on Lillooet's Main Street and later became also the local Nissan dealership. Basran also started Sanbar Contracting, an asphalt and road building company.

== Political career ==
Basran was elected to Village Council (Lillooet was then a village municipality, today it is incorporated as a district municipality) and eventually ran for mayor, winning and serving three terms, later becoming school district chairman, the only person in Lillooet's history to serve the community in both positions.

In addition to his elected positions, Basran was a member of the Recreation Commission, the Economic Development Commission and the Chamber of Commerce. He also represented Lillooet for many years on the South Central Health Unit Board, the Squamish-Lillooet Regional District Board, the Okanagan Mainline Municipal Association and Yale District Credit Union Board and, from the 1900s onwards after health care services were regionalized, he represented the community on the Thompson Regional Health Board. He belonged to the Lillooet Elks Lodge #467, serving as Exalted Ruler and District Deputy.

Basran ran twice for the party's nomination in the now-defunct provincial Yale-Lillooet riding for the Social Credit Party of British Columbia but never won the seat; Lillooet is now represented by the Fraser-Nicola riding.

== Legacy ==
Basran was the driving force in creating the Only in Lillooet Days festival, since renamed Begbie Days and then the Apricot Tsaqwem Festival (tsaqwem is the St'at'imcets name for a certain local berry, also spelled chokum in English adaptation). For the inauguration of the first incarnation of this community event in 1982, he dressed in an all-white suit and white cowboy hat (the outfit worn by the Boss Hogg character in the TV show The Dukes of Hazzard).

Basran died on 29 December 2013 in Kamloops. He was predeceased by his wife Mary, with whom he had two daughters, Linda and Sandra, and a son, Michael. He also had three grandsons.

== See also ==
- Indo-Canadians in British Columbia
