= Buckam Singh =

Canadian Expeditionary Force soldier

Private Buckam Singh
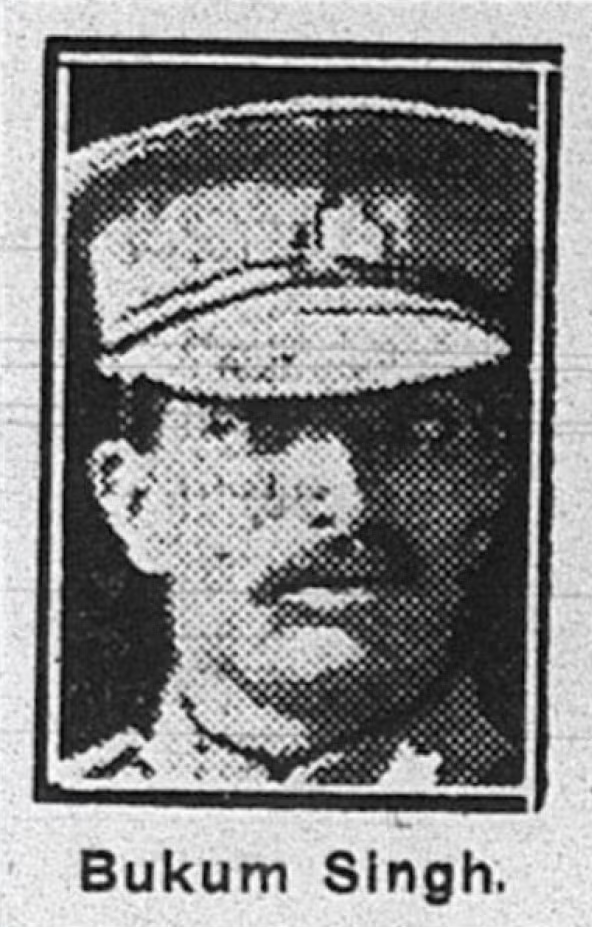
- Born: December 5, 1893; Mahilpur, Punjab, British India
- Died: August 27, 1919 (aged 25); Kitchener, Ontario, Canada
- Other names: Buk Am, Bukam, or Bukkan
- Occupations: Labourer, Soldier of the Canadian Expeditionary Force
- Known for: One of 10 Sikh-Canadian soldiers during WWI

Buckam Singh (December 5, 1893 – August 27, 1919)—sometimes spelled Buk Am, Bukam, or Bukkan—was an Indo-Canadian Sikh soldier who served with the Canadian Army in the First World War and early Sikh pioneer in Ontario.

While military records show that there were at least 10 Sikhs who served with Canada during WWI, little is known about them. As such, Buckam Singh's story is notable for being discovered more fully than the others, beginning with the discovery of his military grave and Victory Medal. Among the nine other soldiers, eight served in Europe, two of whom were killed in action.

His last service was with the 28th Battalion, according to his headstone.

== Early life ==
Buckam Singh was born on December 5, 1893, in the farming town of Mahilpur, Punjab, British India, to Badan Singh and Chandi Kaur, into a Sikh family. In March 1903, at age 9, Singh was married to Pritam Kaur of Jamsher in an arranged marriage.

At the time, India was still under British control, and as such, many Sikhs enlisted in the British Army due to their warrior tradition that dated back to the time of Guru Hargobind in the 17th century.

In 1897, a group of Sikh soldiers travelled from India (Punjab) to Vancouver, British Columbia, on board the Empress of India, to celebrate Queen Victoria's Diamond Jubilee. Upon their return to Punjab, word about Canada spread and the 14-year-old Buckam Singh left for British Columbia in 1907—though he could not bring his bride with him due to harsh immigration laws.

At the time of Singh's arrival, there was a labour shortage in British Columbia. While the Canadians did not like to give jobs to foreigners, they had no choice, and Singh became a miner just as many other Sikh labourers in Canada.

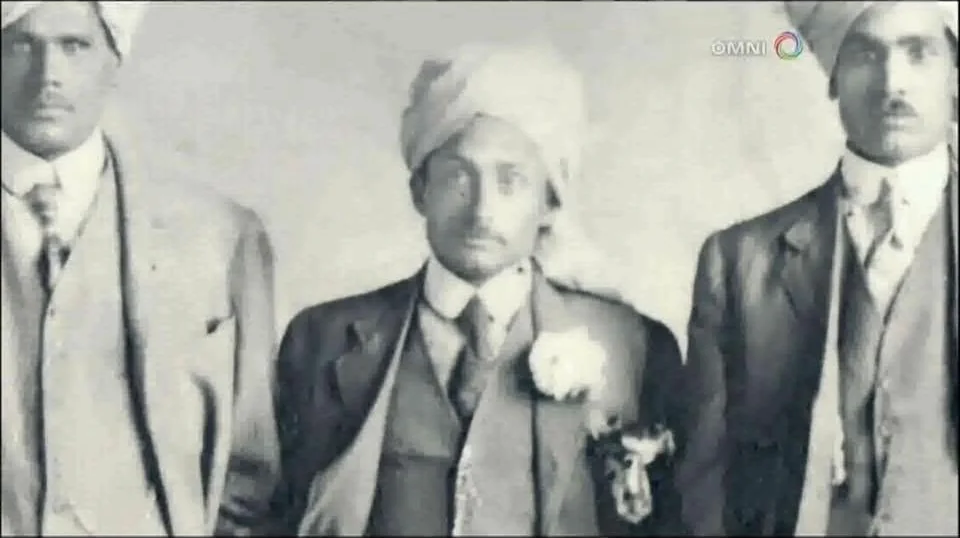
Detail of Buckam Singh (middle) from a photograph of him with a group of Sikh men, ca.1907–1915

Later in 1907, riots in Vancouver prompted the Canadian government to institute laws that required all immigrants to Canada to travel from their homeland in one continuous journey, a feat impossible for Indians as there was no direct route from India to Canada. Additionally, all new immigrants had to have $250 in savings, ten times the amount European immigrants were required to have. This was quite a large amount as, at the time, wages were just cents a week. Because of these discriminatory conditions, Singh moved to Ontario in 1912 or 1913 and began working as a farm hand in Rosebank.

== Military service ==
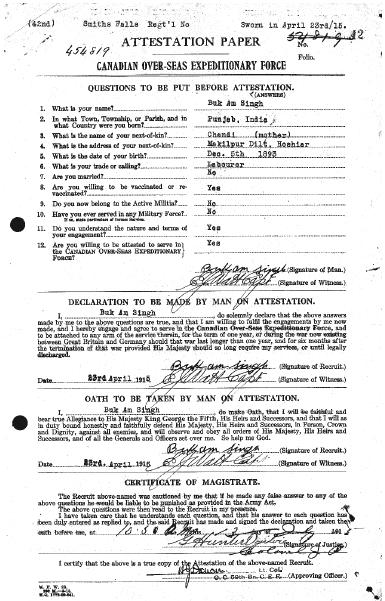
Singh's enlistment papers

On August 5, 1914, Canada entered the Great War (World War I) as a member of the British Empire.

On April 23 the next year, Buckam Singh, at the age of 22, moved to the town of Smith Falls, Ontario, and enlisted with the 59th Battalion of the Canadian Expeditionary Force, becoming one of ten Canadian Sikhs allowed to fight for Canada in the war. (The 59th Battalion was commanded at this time by Lt.-Col. H.J. Dawson.) He was then sent to Barriefield Camp near Kingston, Ontario, for his medical examination and training. On his attestation papers (where his name is written as "Buk Am Singh"), he recorded himself as of the Church of England religion, as there was no option for Sikh.

Because of the need to deploy troops to the Western Front as quickly as possible, Singh received training and was shipped out in the first of two contingents of 250 men aboard the S.S. Scandinavian 2 on August 27, 1915, arriving in England on September 5. There, Singh was transferred to the 39th Reserve Battalion to await deployment to a combat battalion. On January 21, 1916, Singh arrived in France and joined the 20th Battalion. While fighting, he was hit on the head with shrapnel on June 2, and sent to hospital until the end of the month, when he rejoined his battalion. He was again wounded at St. Eloi on July 24 and sent to a hospital run by John McCrae, and then crossed the English Channel to make his recovery in Manchester.

On March 11, 1917, Singh was considered fit enough to rejoin active combat and was sent to the Central Ontario Regimental Depot, where he waited to be sent to France again. However, he developed severe tuberculosis and was sent back to Canada in May. He was discharged on August 1, 1918, and spent the remainder of his days at Freeport Military Hospital, where he died on August 27, 1919.

He is buried at Mount Hope Cemetery in Kitchener, Ontario. His grave is the only known military grave in Canada of a Sikh soldier from the World Wars.

== Legacy ==
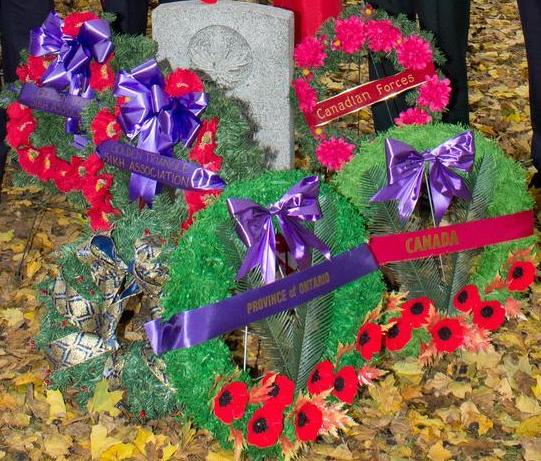
Private Buckam Singh gravestone, annual Sikh Remembrance Day service, Mount Hope Cemetery, Kitchener, Ontario 2012

The largely undocumented story of Sikh-Canadian soldiers was told in the documentary Canadian Soldier Sikhs: A Little Story in a Big War, by filmmaker David R. Gray for OMNI Television, which uncovered the stories of Buckam Singh and other Canadian-Sikh soldiers.

An annual Sikh Remembrance Day Ceremony has now been held every year at the historic location of the grave of Buckam Singh. The ceremony has since become one of the largest annual gathering of Sikh soldiers and veterans in North America.

== Canada Post stamp ==
On November 3rd, 2025 Canada Post made a Sikh remembrance day stamp commemorating Sikhs that served in the Canadian Armed forces since the World War l.

The stamp has a turbaned Sikh soldier named Private Singh paying his respects to a gravestone of Private Buckam Singh At Mount Hope Cemetery in Kitchener,Ontario.

== See also ==
- Military history of Canada during World War I
- Sikhism in Canada
- List of Canadian Sikhs
- Kesur Singh
