= Nav Bhatia =

Canadian businessman and superfan

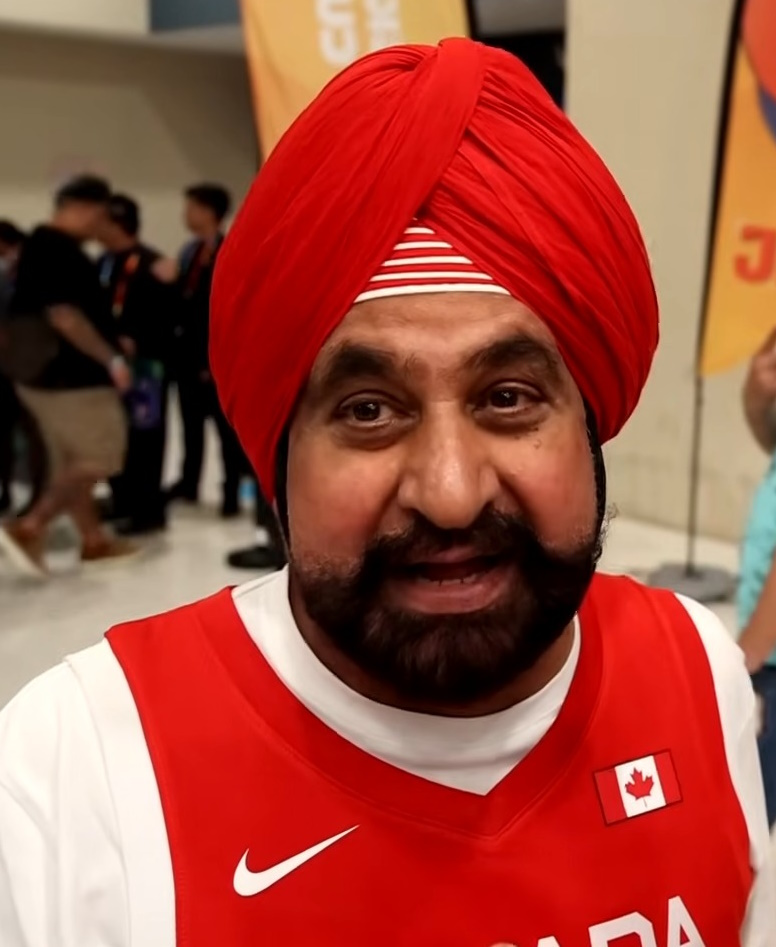
- Bhatia in 2023
- Born: July 9, 1952 (age 74); New Delhi, Delhi, India
- Education: Mechanical engineering
- Years active: 1984–present
- Known for: Superfan of the Toronto Raptors
- Children: 1
- Awards: Top 25 Canadian Immigrants Award
- Website: navbhatiasuperfan.com

Nav Bhatia (born July 9, 1952), nicknamed the Raptors Superfan, is a Canadian businessman and superfan of the Toronto Raptors basketball team. He founded and currently runs the Superfan Foundation to help unite people through the love of the sport.

Bhatia has attended every Toronto Raptors home game since 1995, temporarily ending in 2020 when he could no longer attend home games in person due to the COVID-19 pandemic and the Raptors' temporary relocation to Tampa, Florida. His 26-year 100 percent Toronto home game attendance streak ended on December 10, 2021, when he was forced into isolation following a COVID-19 outbreak at an event he attended. On June 19, 2018, Bhatia was named a recipient of the Top 25 Canadian Immigrants Award.

== Early life and career ==
Bhatia was born in New Delhi and moved to Toronto in 1984 amid anti-Sikh riots in India. He struggled to find work as a mechanical engineer and decided to work as a car salesman. He achieved a record 127 car sales in three months and bought the dealership two years later. Bhatia is the owner of one of the top-selling Hyundai car dealerships in Canada.

== Toronto Raptors superfan ==
Bhatia is known for being the Raptors’ biggest fan, having attended every Raptors home game in the franchise's 25-year history from 1995 to 2020, until the COVID-19 pandemic forced the Raptors to temporarily play their 2020–2021 season in Tampa, Florida. His 26-year 100 per cent Toronto home game attendance streak finally ended on December 10, 2021, when he was forced into isolation due to an outbreak of COVID-19 at Masai Ujiri's Giants of Africa Gala, which he attended.

After the Toronto Raptors won the NBA Championship during the 2018–2019 season, he became the first fan to receive an official NBA Championship ring.

In 2020, the Naismith Memorial Basketball Hall of Fame announced that Bhatia would be one of the first fans memorialized in its new superfan gallery for their 2020 induction class. He was officially honoured by the Hall of Fame on May 15, 2021, as part of their ceremonial induction weekend.

In 2021, Bhatia was announced as the subject of both Superfan: The Nav Bhatia Story, a CBC Television documentary film which aired on December 3, 2021, and Superfan, an upcoming Hollywood studio biopic slated to star Kal Penn as Bhatia.

In 2023, the city of Mississauga awarded Bhatia the Key to the City.

In 2025, Humber Polytechnic awarded Bhatia with an honorary degree.

Bhatia is frequently invited to talk about basketball in the media.

== Philanthropy ==
Bhatia founded the Superfan Foundation in 2018 as a way to bring people in Canada and around the world together through sport. He spends $300K every year to send children to Raptors games.
