= Harnarayan Singh =

Canadian sports announcer

- Born: December 21, 1984 (age 41); Brooks, Alberta, Canada
- Education: Mount Royal University
- Occupation: Sports announcer
- Website: www.icesingh.com

Harnarayan Singh MSM (born December 21, 1984) is a Canadian sports announcer and journalist.

Singh was the first Punjabi-language broadcaster in the National Hockey League, having called games for Hockey Night in Canada: Punjabi Edition (initially for CBC Sports, and later Omni Television), and having since participated in Sportsnet's overall English-language coverage as well since 2016.

== Early life ==
Singh was born on December 21, 1984, in Brooks, Alberta. His parents immigrated to Canada in the 1960s from India. Singh was an avid hockey fan as a child; he and his siblings were fans of Wayne Gretzky and the Edmonton Oilers, and would do mock announcing using toy microphones. He studied broadcasting at Mount Royal University in Calgary, where he hosted a hockey talk show on the student radio station. Singh was accepted into an internship at TSN in 2004.

== Broadcasting career ==
After leaving TSN, Singh worked as a reporter for CBC Calgary. Singh came to the attention of fellow CBC employee, former NHL goalie, and announcer Kelly Hrudey; Hrudey recommended Singh to the network as a possible new announcer. Joel Darling, the executive producer of Hockey Night in Canada, then approached Singh about calling a hockey game in Punjabi, which Darling believed fit the public broadcaster's goal to "attract new Canadians and people who normally wouldn’t watch the sport of hockey". In 2009, Singh began announcing National Hockey League games in the Punjabi language for Hockey Night in Canada, marking the first ever NHL broadcasts in the language. He continued his work at CBC Calgary to pay for his weekly flights to Toronto, but the CBC eventually found out and paid for his travel.

With the national rights to the NHL moving to Rogers Media in 2014, Singh subsequently moved to Omni Television's Hockey Night in Canada: Punjabi Edition. During the 2016 Stanley Cup Final, Singh received attention for his call of Nick Bonino's game-winning overtime goal for the Pittsburgh Penguins in Game 1, in which he energetically repeatedly chanted Bonino's last name; footage of the call became a viral video, while Penguins head coach Mike Sullivan showed it to the team prior to Game 2 and described it as being entertaining. In November 2016, Singh joined Sportsnet's broadcast crew for a game between the Calgary Flames and Toronto Maple Leafs, making him the first Sikh-Canadian to participate in an English-language NHL broadcast.

In September 2020, Singh published a memoir, titled One Game at a Time, which details his early life and broadcasting career. On January 13, 2021, Singh made his English play-by-play debut, calling the Vancouver Canucks' season opening game against the Edmonton Oilers for Sportsnet. At the 9th Canadian Screen Awards in 2021, Singh won the award for Best Sports Play-by-Play. The Punjabi edition of hockey night ended in 2026 due to being cancelled by Rogers Sportsnet.

== Personal life ==
On June 1, 2022, Singh was given an honorary Doctorate of Law by his alma mater Mount Royal University. He resides in Calgary and is married with two children.
