= Ranjit Cheema =

Canadian gangster and drug trader (d. 2012)

- Born: Ranjit Singh Cheema; 1968; Cheema Khurd, Jalandhar district, Punjab, India
- Died: 2 May 2012 (aged 43); Vancouver, British Columbia, Canada
- Cause of death: Targeted drive-by shooting
- Known for: Drug lord, crime boss
- Children: 1 daughter

Ranjit "Ranj" Singh Cheema (1968 – 2 May 2012) was a Vancouver-based Indian-Canadian gangster, Drug kingpin and longtime under-world Crime boss alongside his Punjabi Mafia Co-boss Bindy Johal and later alongside the Buttar brothers and Tejinder “Tee” Malli. He was involved in organized crime for about three-decades in Vancouver and internationally as well as cocaine trafficking.

== Early life ==
Ranjit Singh Cheema was born in 1968 to a Jat Sikh family of the Cheema clan in the small village of Cheema Khurd, Jalandhar district, Punjab, India. Cheema moved with his family to England at the age of 3 years old and then later to British Columbia, Canada in October 1978 when he was ten years old. According to Cheema, his father Malkit was abusive and suffered from alcoholism and his family was poor. Cheema worked with his mother in Fraser Valley berry farms during summer break from the ages of 10 to 15, following which he worked as a janitor at night while attending high school. After graduating from high school in 1986, Cheema went to college, studying criminal justice while working as a bouncer and then as a truck driver. Cheema claimed that he wanted to become a police officer while in college.

== Criminal activities ==
Cheema pleaded guilty to a nightclub shooting where he intimidated some men over a woman named Monica Alvarez at a Southwest Marine Drive nightclub on November 19, 1993; as it was alleged by her that the men had bumped into her and caused trouble which caused Ranjit to intervene on her behalf, prior to this he had no criminal record. In the May 1995 trial of Bhupinder "Bindy" Singh Johal, who was accused of murdering gangster brothers Jimsher "Jimmy" Singh Dosanjh and Ranjit "Ron" Singh Dosanjh, Cheema was identified as an associate of Johal and a major drug distributor involved in cocaine trafficking. In August 1995, Cheema was shot at the Zodiac Karaoke nightclub in Richmond, British Columbia. At the time of the shooting, Cheema was with Manjinder "Robbie" Singh Kandola, a founder of the Independent Soldiers gang. The two would later fall out, and Kandola would be killed in 2002, a murder believed to be ordered by Cheema.

In 1998, the United States charged Cheema of attempting to smuggle heroin and hashish from Pakistan to California and exchange it with Colombian gangs for cocaine. He would not be extradited for another decade as he filed numerous appeals.

At a May 2000 wedding in Vancouver attended by Cheema and by then-premier Ujjal Dosanjh, Cheema's bodyguard Mike Brar was killed. After investigating Cheema following Brar's murder, Vancouver Sun reporter Kim Bolan found that he had not been arrested on a charge for assault in Burnaby. Cheema was then arrested but released after the complainant died.

In 2008, Cheema was finally extradited to the United States, where he pleaded guilty. MP Sukhminder "Sukh" Singh Dhaliwal faced controversy after writing to a U.S. District Court judge on official House of Commons stationery in support of Cheema. Cheema was imprisoned in California until being released in 2012, when he returned to Vancouver and attempted to return to drug smuggling.

== Personal life and death ==
Cheema was married and had a daughter born in 2004.

He was killed on 2 May 2012, in a targeted drive-by shooting, just three months after being released from prison for the attempted sale of 200 kilograms of heroin. According to crime journalist Kim Bolan and her police sources, "Since returning from a California prison three months ago, longtime Vancouver gangster Ranjit Singh Cheema had been trying to muscle his way back into the lucrative B.C. drug trade before he was gunned down Wednesday. In the process, Cheema disrespected some of his former underlings who have moved up in the business since the 43-year-old went to jail. Some close to Cheema, as well as police sources, believe recent disputes with old associates could have led to the gangland execution of the former south slope crime boss in front of his parents' house on East 61st Avenue. "He was trying to step into his old role," one friend said. "He didn't realize that things have changed."

== See also ==
- Indo-Canadian organized crime
- List of unsolved murders (2000–present)
