= Bindy Johal =

Canadian criminal (1971–1998)

- Born: Bhupinder Singh Johal; January 14, 1971; Vancouver, British Columbia, Canada
- Died: December 20, 1998 (aged 27); Vancouver, British Columbia, Canada
- Other name: Bindy
- Occupations: Crime boss; Gangster; Drug lord
- Convictions: possession of dangerous weapons; possession of a loaded prohibited firearm
- Criminal charges: money laundering; first degree murder; second degree murder; aggravated assault; extortion; racketeering; illegal debt collection; obstruction of justice; possession of dangerous weapons; possession of a loaded prohibited firearm; attempted murder

Bhupinder "Bindy" Singh Johal (January 14, 1971 – December 20, 1998) was an Indo-Canadian gangster from Vancouver, British Columbia. A self-confessed drug kingpin, he was known for his outspoken nature, blatant disregard for authority and his longtime rivalry with his former Punjabi Mafia Bosses turned rivals; Robbie Kandola and the Dosanjh Brothers, who led a rival Punjabi Mafia faction, while Johal controlled his own faction alongside international Drug lord Ranjit Cheema. On December 20, 1998, Johal was fatally shot in the back of the head at a crowded nightclub in Vancouver.

== Early life ==
Johal was born in 1971 (although some sources have noted 1972 and 1973) in South Vancouver, British Columbia, Canada, although some later sources claim he was born in Shankar Nakodar Punjab, India, although this is not corroborated by any primary sources. Bindy was born into a Jatt Sikh family of the Johal clan. Most sources state he was born and raised in Vancouver although some later one claim that he immigrated to Vancouver, British Columbia with his family at the age of four. His parents separated and he was raised by his mother. He was increasingly temperamental, resented discipline, and had a lack of respect and remorse for others. He suffered from severe depression when his parents cut his hair after an armed assault in Canada in the aftermath of the Assassination of Indira Gandhi, which happened miles away in Delhi, his mother said, "That was the only time I saw another expression of his other than anger and silence." Johal was considered to be a "problem child" by his teachers. One of Johal's teachers, Rob Sandhu, stated: "When he came into Grade 8, it didn't seem like he had any problems. It seems these kids are not being flagged. But teachers are raising these issues, so why aren't we acting on it?"

Although he did well in school and was even on the honour roll, he was expelled from Sir Charles Tupper Secondary School and sentenced to 60 days in jail after he "brutally" assaulted his vice-principal in 1989. Johal tried to justify his behaviour at his trial in a defence that the journalist Jerry Langton wrote "smacked of cold-blooded cynicism" by saying that as an Indo-Canadian that he was the victim of a racist society and he was only just lashing out against society by beating up his vice-principal so severely that he had to go to the hospital emergency room to save his life. The judge at Johal's trial rejected this defence. The judge noted there was no evidence that the vice-principal was a racist and that whatever slights and insults Johal may have endured from others was no excuse for the assault.

Having moved to Richmond, British Columbia, Johal enrolled in McNair Secondary School. Johal smashed in the window of a car using a baseball bat and was convicted of possession of a dangerous weapon. Johal enrolled in college, but dropped out after his first semester to begin his criminal career. Johal joined a once Hispanic gang called Los Diablos ("The Devils"). As the membership of Los Diablos became more Indo-Canadian, the gang was renamed as the Punjabi Mafia. He built a reputation as a hit-man working for Jimmy and Ron Dosanjh, both of whom he would later betray and have killed. Johal also started to sell cocaine.

On March 14, 1991, a Colombian drug trafficker, Teodoro Salcedo, was murdered in Vancouver Jimsher "Jimmy" Dosanjh was arrested and charged with the murder. While Dosanjh was in jail awaiting his trial which ended with his acquittal, Johal took advantage of his absence to make himself leader of the gang. Johal and his gang hijacked trucks carrying electronics and automobiles landed at the port of Vancouver, which he sold on the black market. A television documentary at the time estimated that Johal had an annual income of $4 million.

Bindy reportedly had antisocial personality disorder which may account for why he was so quick to kill those close to him. He didn't keep close friends and was extremely callous to his associates. According to Constable Spencer, "All he was concerned about was himself, he was very narcissistic in nature and had a general hatred of people. Bindy actually met Bal Buttar, one of his close associates, in prison when he was in his twenties. They never knew each other growing up and from Bal's statements, Bindy made it very clear that they were not friends, but business partners as he did with everyone else in his group." He attended school with Harjit Sajjan, who later became the Canadian Minister of Defense.

== Dosanjh murders ==
Johal was responsible for the murders of gangster brothers Ron Dosanjh and Jimmy Dosanjh. Jimmy Dosanjh was killed in February 1994, and Ron was killed in April 1994. Johal knew that Jimmy Dosanjh had taken out a contract to kill him for over C$230,000, according to Crown prosecutors. (Note: On April 24, 1994, Johal's neighbour, Glen Olson, was shot and killed when walking his dog. Police believe that the assassins mistakenly killed Olson, and the intended victim was Johal.) The hitman whom Jimmy Dosanjh hired to kill Johal instead approached him and made a deal for more money to kill Dosanjh. On February 25, 1994, Dosanjh went into a back alley to inspect some stolen electronics when he was ambushed and killed by his own men, whose true loyalty was to Johal. Afterwards remarked "This Jimmy Dosanjh, they portrayed him as a hit-man this that. Personally from what I've seen of him on the street I don't think he could have hit his way out of a paper bag."

In a television interview, Ranjit "Ron" Dosanjh told a television crew that if he saw Johal at his house, he’d “shoot him between the eyes". Johal when asked to comment about the remark by another television crew snapped back: "Basically, I just want these guys to know you got another thing coming, bitch! I'm still around!" On April 19, 1994, Ron Dosanjh was killed in his red pick-up truck while waiting for a traffic light when a car pulled alongside and a man opened fire with an AK-47 assault rifle. Dosanjh took several bullets to his face, killing him instantly; his truck veered wildly and crashed into a tree. On April 24, 1994, Johal's neighbour, Greg Olson, who was walking his dog, was killed in a case of mistaken identity. On April 25, 1994, Johal was charged with two counts of first-degree murder in connection with the Dosanjh murders along with Sarbjit Gill, Rajinder "Big Raj" Benji, Michael Kim Budai, Sun News Lai, Preet "Peter" Sarbjit Gill, and Kim "Phil" Ho-Sik, whom the Crown alleged to be the actual gunman who killed the Dosanjh brothers.

Because of the required security for the trial, it was one of the most expensive trials in Canadian history. His former brother-in-law, Peter Gill, was also accused. The accused, including Gill and Johal, were acquitted. During and following the trial, Gill had an affair with Gillian Guess, an active juror on the trial. Guess was sentenced to 18 months after being convicted of obstruction of justice. Gill was tried and convicted of the same crime and sentenced to six years in prison. The Crown appealed the acquittal of Johal and other defendants, (Note: Other defendants include: Raj Benji, Mike Budai, Peter Gill, Phil Kim, and Sun News Lal,) but Johal was killed before the new trial began. Gill was not retried.

== The Punjabi Mafia and Johal's criminal activity ==
The Punjabi Mafia is a loosely affiliated criminal organization originating in British Columbia with gang members. The gang, initially being liberal in its membership, became more ethnocentric over time, some subgroups excepted. These groups are still active and notorious in Vancouver and have been since the early 1990s. They have been linked to the Independent Soldiers (IS), Red Scorpions, Lotus Triads, Hells Angels, and the United Nations (UN) gang in Canada, although several members of the Independent Soldiers can also be grouped as part of the mafia as well. Bindy Johal was accepted into the Punjabi Mafia in the early 1990s most likely through Ranjit Cheema or Ron Dosanjh. Ranjit Cheema and Ron Dosanjh were among the few who had full control of the criminal organization.

According to Johal's former lieutenant Bal Buttar, (Note: Bal Buttar had been shot in the head in August 2001, which left him a quadriplegic.) Punjabi Mafia hitmen claimed contracts in B.C. They are responsible for dozens of murders in Canada in the 90s alone and the majority of those murders still remain unsolved. Buttar admitted to performing several executions alongside Bindy, as well as the unsuccessful attempt to kill Johal's associate and former brother-in-law, Preet Sarbjit "Peter" Gill. However, Buttar was shocked when Bindy said he wanted his own cousin killed. "I thought this guy was kidding, but he was actually being serious, he wanted to take him out." Buttar was suspected of being behind the hit on Robbie Kandola outside his Coal Harbour penthouse. He believed Kandola was the one responsible for his younger brother's death. He is also suspected to be the one behind Bindy's death. It is still up for debate whether he was killed because Bal feared Bindy would kill him or because Ranj and other major players turned on him. He was charged with aggravated assault for beating two men in a bar with a broken beer bottle in 1997. When imprisoned, Johal was labelled a "menace to society."

Johal was earning approximately $500,000–$900,000 a week in his prime through various illegal activities including murder for hire, debt collecting, and drug dealing. He was also affiliated to the Buttar brothers who were well known across the Lower Mainland for their brutal gangland slayings. Even so, Johal coldly told Buttar: "You listen to me. If you take care of things at your end, I'll be happy with you, brother. If you fuck me over, I'll kill you. Right?". Johal's chosen instrument was a hit squad which Johal named "The Elite" consisting of five Indo-Canadian hit men. Buttar later stated that "The Elite" hit squad was responsible for 25 murders over a five year period. Johal had a "legendary" bad temper, known for his frequent outbursts of violent rage, which led him to be convicted in 1997 of attacking two men in a bar fight with a broken beer bottle. Johal had convictions for obstruction of justice, possession of dangerous weapons, and aggravated assault.

A Chinese-Canadian rival drug dealer, Randy Chan was kidnapped on October 25, 1996, and Johal was charged with his kidnapping. Reportedly Chan had been kidnapped by Roman Mann, one of Johal's associates. Mann was angry with the quality of the cocaine that Chan had just sold him, which he stated was very diluted despite the premium price. Chan was held captive for 50 or 56 hours, part of which was spent in an automobile trunk. Johal phoned Chan's older brother, Raymond, to tell him that if he wanted to see his brother alive again, to give him 5 kilograms of cocaine in exchange for his brothers' life. Johal negotiated Chan's release with his brother to be in exchange for $500,000 paid by the Lotus triads to the Punjabi Mafia faction of Johal. Chan's brother was Raymond Chan, a gang member of the Chinese criminal organization called the "Lotus". (Note: Roman Mann, also charged in the kidnapping of Randy Chan, was killed before the kidnapping trial was set to commence, allegedly by Bindy. He reportedly had wanted to get out of the Punjabi Mafia due to the increasing danger of being in the gang following the shooting of a Hells Angels clubhouse; He was beaten by Johal when he expressed his plan. Mann was shot in the back of the head and his body was found under the Queensborough Bridge. In 2003, a group of men had beaten Raymond Chan to death.)

Johal made no effort to disguise the fact that he was a gangster, and would threaten the lives of rivals in interviews with television crews. Johal became a folk hero in the Lower Mainland, being admired for his success as a gangster, and many of the young men who joined organized crime admitted that it was Johal's example that inspired them to turn to crime. One gangster who wished to remain anonymous told the academic Arthur J. Pais: "To many young people in the immigrant community who feel that Canadian society does not give them enough chance to succeed, joining gangsters is an exercise in building their self-esteem. Why do you think Bindy Johal was a hero to many young Indo-Canadians. His legend had spread wide in the past few years among Indians not only here but also in Toronto and Montreal, New York and San Francisco. He stood up to his school principles, he beat up those who called him racial names—and he was making a lot of money even though he was in his mid-twenties. He drove fancy cars, he had girls falling over him".

His gang was responsible for several murders. The first one killed was Amarjit Singh Dheil who was shot dead while leaving the Marpole-Oakridge Community Centre on January 19, 1997, after watching a hockey game. Dheil was an associate of the Dosanjh brothers, and Johal wanted to see all of the associates of the Dosanjh brothers killed least they try to avenge them. On October 21, 1997, "The Elite" killed Gorinder Singh Khun Khun as he leaving his home. Khun Khun had attended high school alongside Johal, and considered him a friend. Johal in a moment of paranoia was convinced that Khun Khun was involved in the Olson murder, which led him to order Khun Khun's murder. On July 1, 1998, Johal had "The Elite" kill Vinuse News MacKenzie. The reason for MacKenzie's murder was eliminate a romantic rival for the affections of a woman who preferred Mackenzie over Johal.

On September 19, 1998, a member of the gang, Derek Chand Shankar, insulted Johal, calling him an "idiot" and a "baby" after Johal stated he was felt too tired to go to a nightclub. Later the same night, Johal showed up at the nightclub and asked Buttar where Shankar was. Buttar stated that he was drunk and sleeping in a truck in the parking lot. Despite knowing that Johal was planning to kill Shankar, Buttar drove the truck to the Queensborough Bridge in New Westminster. As Shankar was waking up from his stupor, Johal shot him. On November 29, 1998, Johal's associate, Roman "Danny" Mann expressed the wish to leave the gang, leading to Johal to punch him out in fury. Later the same night, Mann's body was found in an empty industrial lot in Burnaby with a single bullet through his head. When Buttar asked Johal about the murder, he stated: "Blame it on the H.A. [Hells Angels]". Johal then asked Buttar if he wanted to go to a nightclub with him.

== Death ==
On Sunday, December 20, 1998, Johal was dancing at the Palladium nightclub in Vancouver when he was shot from behind at 4:30 a.m. He was rushed to Vancouver General Hospital where he died 4 hours later. No witnesses were able to describe the assailant. Four months before Johal's death, "at least three of Johal's associates had also been killed", with each killing alleged to be connected to Bindy, according to the confessions of Bal Buttar. In 2004, before he died, Bal Buttar told a reporter that he ordered the assassination of Johal, fearing that if he didn't do it, Johal would have had him murdered. The kidnapping trial was set to commence within two months of his murder; Buttar would have served up to 10 years if he had been convicted. Buttar was never convicted in the murder of Johal due to his blind and quadriplegic state. Buttar died in November 2011.

Kash Heed, commanding officer of the 3rd Police District in Vancouver, stated that it was really disappointing that someone as bright and intelligent as Johal would turn to a life of crime. He added that young people who want to emulate gangsters like Bindy see the benefits of being a criminal, but do not see the danger of putting their lives at risk.

== In popular culture ==
- Beeba Boys, fictionalized film inspired by real crimes including those committed by Bindy Johal

== See also ==
- List of unsolved murders (1980–1999)

== Books ==
- Langton, Jerry (2013). The Notorious Bacon Brothers : inside gang warfare on Vancouver streets. Etobicoke, Ont.: J. Wiley and Sons Canada. ISBN 978-1118388679.
- Langton, Jerry (2015). Cold War How Organized Crime Works in Canada and Why It's About to Get More Violent. Toronto: HarperColllins. ISBN 978-1-4434-3255-9.
