= Sat Bir Singh Khalsa =

Canadian medical researcher

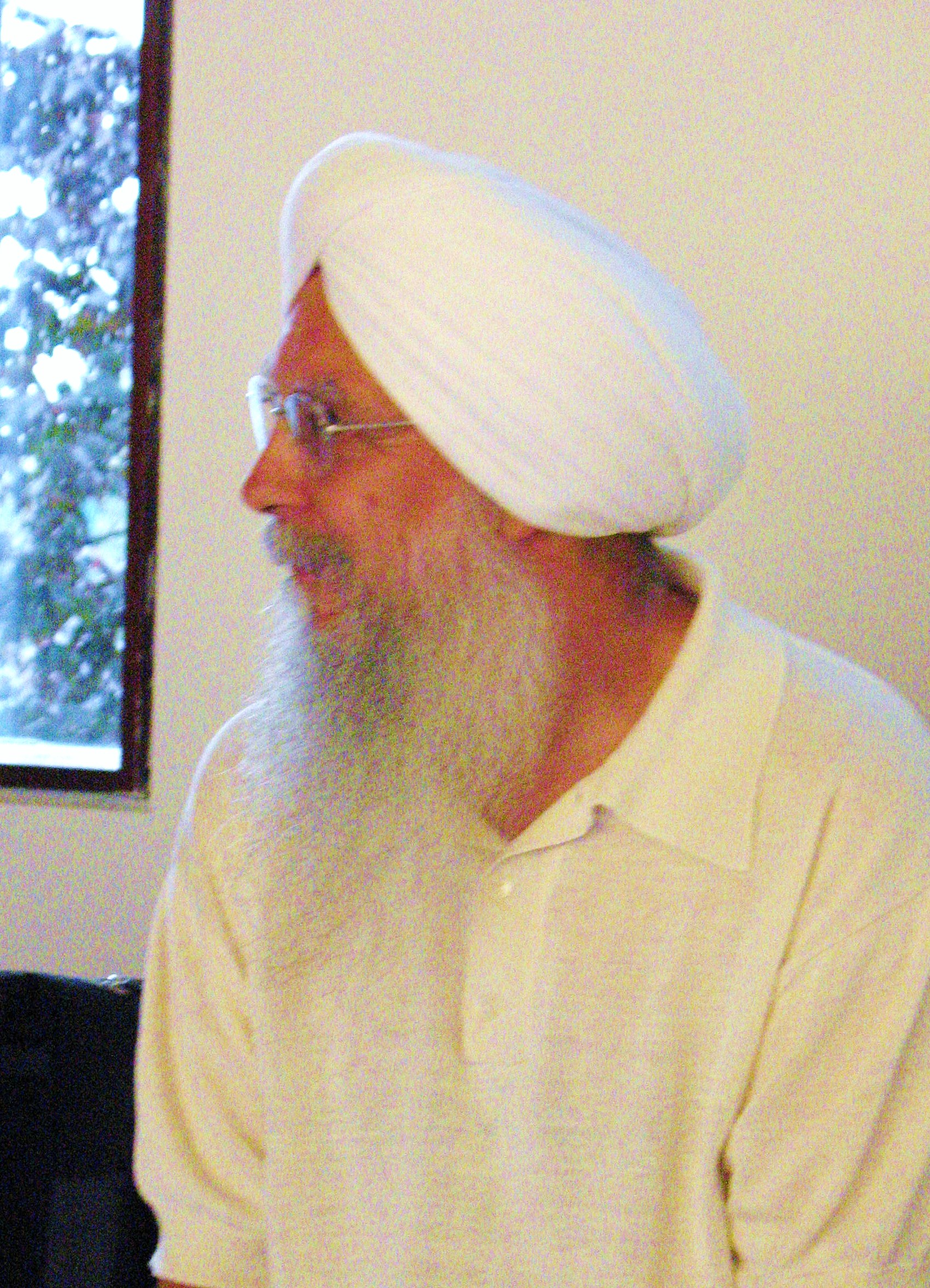
- Sat Bir Singh Khalsa at University of Toronto
- Born: 20 December 1951; Toronto, Ontario, Canada
- Spouse: Siri Krishna Kaur

Sat Bir Singh Khalsa is a researcher in the field of body mind medicine, specializing in yoga research. Originally from Toronto, he earned his Ph.D. at the University of Toronto, where he also began his practice of Kundalini Yoga under the tutelage of Yogi Bhajan. He is a Corresponding Member of the Faculty of Medicine having retired as an Associate Professor of Medicine at Harvard Medical School. Sat Bir Singh Khalsa serves as the Director of Yoga Research for the Kundalini Research Institute, Research Associate at the Benson Henry Institute for Mind Body Medicine, and Research Affiliate of the Osher Center for Integrative Medicine. He works with the International Association of Yoga Therapists to promote research on yoga and yoga therapy as the chair of the scientific program committee for the annual Symposium on Yoga Therapy and Research and as editor-in-chief of the International Journal of Yoga Therapy. He is medical editor of the Harvard Medical School Special Report, An Introduction to Yoga, chief editor of the medical textbook The Principles and Practice of Yoga in Health Care (2nd Edition, 2024), and coeditor of The Principles and Practice of Yoga for Children and Adolescents (2024).

== Research Studies ==
Sat Bir Singh Khalsa has participated in numerous mind-body studies. His work has been published in more than eighty papers. He has conducted clinical research trials evaluating yoga interventions for insomnia, post-traumatic stress disorder, chronic stress, and anxiety disorders and in both public school and occupational settings.

== Media and Public Speaking ==
Sat Bir Singh Khalsa is often invited to speak internationally about yoga research world wide by government and NGOs, schools, academic institutions, research conferences and yoga events.

== General Publication ==
- Sat Bir Singh Khalsa. (2009). "Kundalini Yoga as Therapy: A Research Perspective," chapter in Kundalini Rising: Exploring the Awakening of Kundalini. Boulder Colorado, Sounds True, Inc.
