= Nuvraj Bassi =

Canadian football player (born 1983)

Nuvraj Singh Bassi
No. 77
- Position: Defensive tackle

Personal information
- Born: March 20, 1983 (age 43); Vancouver, British Columbia, Canada
- Listed height: 6 ft 5 in (1.96 m)
- Listed weight: 315 lb (143 kg)

Career information
- College: Oregon
- CFL draft: 2005: 5th round, 43rd overall pick

Career history
- 2005: BC Lions
- 2008–2009: Saskatchewan Roughriders
- 2010: Montreal Alouettes
- 2011: BC Lions
- Stats at CFL.ca (archive)

Nuvraj Singh Bassi (born March 20, 1983) is a former defensive tackle in the Canadian Football League. He was drafted 43rd overall in the 2005 CFL draft by the BC Lions. He played college football for the Oregon Ducks.

He also played for the Saskatchewan Roughriders and Montreal Alouettes.

== Professional career ==
Nuvraj was drafted by the BC Lions in the fifth round (43rd overall) in the 2005 CFL draft and spent the year on the team's practice roster. He did not re-sign with the Lions for the 2006 season and spent two years out of football. He signed with the Saskatchewan Roughriders in 2008 and was on their practice roster for two years, alternating between the offensive line and defensive line. After his release by the Roughriders, he signed with the Montreal Alouettes for the 2010 season. He was signed to the Lions' practice roster in July 2011. He was released by the Lions on October 25, 2011.

== Personal life ==
Bassi's parents are Kalvinder and Inderjit Bassi, and he has one brother and one sister. Nuvraj comes from a sports family, and they were very supportive of their son’s prospects.

Nuvraj Bassi made history as the first Sikh in the Canadian Football League (CFL), when he made his June CFL debut as a member of the Grey Cup Champion Saskatchewan Roughriders.
