= List of House members of the 43rd Parliament of Canada =

This is a list of members of the House of Commons of Canada in the 43rd Canadian Parliament.

== Members ==
Key:

- Party leaders are listed in italics.
- Cabinet ministers are listed in **boldface**.
- The prime minister is listed in **both**.
- The speaker is indicated by "†".
- Parliamentary secretaries is indicated by "‡".

=== Alberta ===
Name	Party	Electoral district	First elected/previously elected	No. of terms
Blake Richards	Conservative	Banff—Airdrie	2008	4th term
Damien Kurek	Conservative	Battle River—Crowfoot	2019	1st term
Martin Shields	Conservative	Bow River	2015	2nd term
Greg McLean	Conservative	Calgary Centre	2019	1st term
Len Webber	Conservative	Calgary Confederation	2015	2nd term
Jasraj Hallan	Conservative	Calgary Forest Lawn	2019	1st term
Bob Benzen	Conservative	Calgary Heritage	2017	2nd term
Stephanie Kusie	Conservative	Calgary Midnapore	2017	2nd term
Michelle Rempel Garner	Conservative	Calgary Nose Hill	2011	3rd term
Pat Kelly	Conservative	Calgary Rocky Ridge	2015	2nd term
Tom Kmiec	Conservative	Calgary Shepard	2015	2nd term
Ron Liepert	Conservative	Calgary Signal Hill	2015	2nd term
Jag Sahota	Conservative	Calgary Skyview	2019	1st term
James Cumming	Conservative	Edmonton Centre	2019	1st term
Kerry Diotte	Conservative	Edmonton Griesbach	2015	2nd term
Ziad Aboultaif	Conservative	Edmonton Manning	2015	2nd term
Tim Uppal	Conservative	Edmonton Mill Woods	2008, (Note: Edmonton—Sherwood Park) 2019	3rd term*
Matt Jeneroux	Conservative	Edmonton Riverbend	2015	2nd term
Heather McPherson	New Democratic	Edmonton Strathcona	2019	1st term
Kelly McCauley	Conservative	Edmonton West	2015	2nd term
Mike Lake	Conservative	Edmonton—Wetaskiwin	2006	5th term
John Barlow	Conservative	Foothills	2014	3rd term
David Yurdiga	Conservative	Fort McMurray—Cold Lake	2014	3rd term
Chris Warkentin	Conservative	Grande Prairie—Mackenzie	2006	5th term
Shannon Stubbs	Conservative	Lakeland	2015	2nd term
Rachael Harder	Conservative	Lethbridge	2015	2nd term
Glen Motz	Conservative	Medicine Hat—Cardston—Warner	2016	2nd term
Arnold Viersen	Conservative	Peace River—Westlock	2015	2nd term
Blaine Calkins	Conservative	Red Deer—Lacombe	2006	5th term
Earl Dreeshen	Conservative	Red Deer—Mountain View	2008	4th term
Garnett Genuis	Conservative	Sherwood Park—Fort Saskatchewan	2015	2nd term
Michael Cooper	Conservative	St. Albert—Edmonton	2015	2nd term
Dane Lloyd	Conservative	Sturgeon River—Parkland	2017	2nd term
Gerald Soroka	Conservative	Yellowhead	2019	1st term

=== British Columbia ===
Name	Party	Electoral district	First elected/previously elected	No. of terms
Ed Fast	Conservative	Abbotsford	2006	5th term
Terry Beech ‡	Liberal	Burnaby North—Seymour	2015	2nd term
Jagmeet Singh	New Democratic	Burnaby South	2019	2nd term
Todd Doherty	Conservative	Cariboo—Prince George	2015	2nd term
Dan Albas	Conservative	Central Okanagan—Similkameen—Nicola	2011	3rd term
Mark Strahl	Conservative	Chilliwack—Hope	2011	3rd term
Tamara Jansen	Conservative	Cloverdale—Langley City	2019	1st term
Ron McKinnon	Liberal	Coquitlam—Port Coquitlam	2015	2nd term
Gord Johns	New Democratic	Courtenay—Alberni	2015	2nd term
Alistair MacGregor	New Democratic	Cowichan—Malahat—Langford	2015	2nd term
**Carla Qualtrough**	Liberal	Delta	2015	2nd term
Randall Garrison	New Democratic	Esquimalt—Saanich—Sooke	2011	3rd term
Ken Hardie	Liberal	Fleetwood—Port Kells	2015	2nd term
Cathy McLeod	Conservative	Kamloops—Thompson—Cariboo	2008	4th term
Tracy Gray	Conservative	Kelowna—Lake Country	2019	1st term
Rob Morrison	Conservative	Kootenay—Columbia	2019	1st term
Tako van Popta	Conservative	Langley—Aldergrove	2019	1st term
Brad Vis	Conservative	Mission—Matsqui—Fraser Canyon	2019	1st term
Paul Manly	Green	Nanaimo—Ladysmith	2019	2nd term
Peter Julian	New Democratic	New Westminster—Burnaby	2004	6th term
Rachel Blaney	New Democratic	North Island—Powell River	2015	2nd term
Mel Arnold	Conservative	North Okanagan—Shuswap	2015	2nd term
**Jonathan Wilkinson**	Liberal	North Vancouver	2015	2nd term
Marc Dalton	Conservative	Pitt Meadows—Maple Ridge	2019	1st term
Nelly Shin	Conservative	Port Moody—Coquitlam	2019	1st term
Bob Zimmer	Conservative	Prince George—Peace River—Northern Rockies	2011	3rd term
Alice Wong	Conservative	Richmond Centre	2008	4th term
Elizabeth May	Green	Saanich—Gulf Islands	2011	3rd term
Taylor Bachrach	New Democratic	Skeena—Bulkley Valley	2019	1st term
Richard Cannings	New Democratic	South Okanagan—West Kootenay	2015	2nd term
Kerry-Lynne Findlay	Conservative	South Surrey—White Rock	2011, (Note: Delta) 2019	2nd term*
Kenny Chiu	Conservative	Steveston—Richmond East	2019	1st term
Randeep Sarai	Liberal	Surrey Centre	2015	2nd term
Sukh Dhaliwal	Liberal	Surrey—Newton	2006, 2015	4th term*
Hedy Fry	Liberal	Vancouver Centre	1993	9th term
Jenny Kwan	New Democratic	Vancouver East	2015	2nd term
Jody Wilson-Raybould	Independent	Vancouver Granville	2015 (Note: First elected as a Liberal)	2nd term
Don Davies	New Democratic	Vancouver Kingsway	2008	4th term
**Joyce Murray**	Liberal	Vancouver Quadra	2008	5th term
**Harjit Sajjan**	Liberal	Vancouver South	2015	2nd term
Laurel Collins	New Democratic	Victoria	2019	1st term
Patrick Weiler	Liberal	West Vancouver—Sunshine Coast—Sea to Sky Country	2019	1st term

=== Manitoba ===
Name	Party	Electoral district	First elected/previously elected	No. of terms
Larry Maguire	Conservative	Brandon—Souris	2013	3rd term
Marty Morantz	Conservative	Charleswood—St. James—Assiniboia—Headingley	2019	1st term
Niki Ashton	New Democratic	Churchill—Keewatinook Aski	2008	4th term
Dan Mazier	Conservative	Dauphin—Swan River—Neepawa	2019	1st term
Daniel Blaikie	New Democratic	Elmwood—Transcona	2015	2nd term
Raquel Dancho	Conservative	Kildonan—St. Paul	2019	1st term
Candice Bergen	Conservative	Portage—Lisgar	2008	4th term
Ted Falk	Conservative	Provencher	2013	3rd term
**Dan Vandal**	Liberal	Saint Boniface—Saint Vital	2015	2nd term
James Bezan	Conservative	Selkirk—Interlake—Eastman	2004	6th term
Leah Gazan	New Democratic	Winnipeg Centre	2019	1st term
Kevin Lamoureux ‡	Liberal	Winnipeg North	2010	4th term
Terry Duguid ‡	Liberal	Winnipeg South	2015	2nd term
**Jim Carr**	Liberal	Winnipeg South Centre	2015	2nd term

=== New Brunswick ===
Name	Party	Electoral district	First elected/previously elected	No. of terms
Serge Cormier	Liberal	Acadie—Bathurst	2015	2nd term
**Dominic LeBlanc**	Liberal	Beauséjour	2000	7th term
Jenica Atwin	Green	Fredericton	2019	1st term
Jenica Atwin	Liberal (Note: Changed affiliation on June 10, 2021)	Fredericton	2019	1st term
Rob Moore	Conservative	Fundy Royal	2004, 2019	5th term*
René Arseneault ‡	Liberal	Madawaska—Restigouche	2015	2nd term
Pat Finnigan	Liberal	Miramichi—Grand Lake	2015	2nd term
Ginette Petitpas Taylor	Liberal	Moncton—Riverview—Dieppe	2015	2nd term
John Williamson	Conservative	New Brunswick Southwest	2011, 2019	2nd term*
Wayne Long	Liberal	Saint John—Rothesay	2015	2nd term
Richard Bragdon	Conservative	Tobique—Mactaquac	2019	1st term

=== Newfoundland and Labrador ===
Name	Party	Electoral district	First elected/previously elected	No. of terms
Ken McDonald	Liberal	Avalon	2015	2nd term
Churence Rogers	Liberal	Bonavista—Burin—Trinity	2017	2nd term
Scott Simms	Liberal	Coast of Bays—Central—Notre Dame	2004	6th term
Yvonne Jones ‡	Liberal	Labrador	2013	3rd term
Gudie Hutchings ‡	Liberal	Long Range Mountains	2015	2nd term
Jack Harris	New Democratic	St. John's East	1987, 2008, 2019	4th term*
**Seamus O'Regan**	Liberal	St. John's South—Mount Pearl	2015	2nd term

=== Nova Scotia ===
Name	Party	Electoral district	First elected/previously elected	No. of terms
Mike Kelloway	Liberal	Cape Breton—Canso	2019	1st term
Sean Fraser ‡	Liberal	Central Nova	2015	2nd term
Lenore Zann	Liberal	Cumberland—Colchester	2019	1st term
Darren Fisher ‡	Liberal	Dartmouth—Cole Harbour	2015	2nd term
Andy Fillmore ‡	Liberal	Halifax	2015	2nd term
Geoff Regan	Liberal	Halifax West	1993, 2000	8th term*
Kody Blois	Liberal	Kings—Hants	2019	1st term
Darrell Samson ‡	Liberal	Sackville—Preston—Chezzetcook	2015	2nd term
**Bernadette Jordan**	Liberal	South Shore—St. Margarets	2015	2nd term
Jaime Battiste	Liberal	Sydney—Victoria	2019	1st term
Chris d'Entremont	Conservative	West Nova	2019	1st term

=== Ontario ===
Name	Party	Electoral district	First elected/previously elected	No. of terms
Mark Holland	Liberal	Ajax	2004, 2015	5th term*
Carol Hughes	New Democratic	Algoma—Manitoulin—Kapuskasing	2008	4th term
Leona Alleslev	Conservative	Aurora—Oak Ridges—Richmond Hill	2015 (Note: First elected as a Liberal)	2nd term
John Brassard	Conservative	Barrie—Innisfil	2015	2nd term
Doug Shipley	Conservative	Barrie—Springwater—Oro-Medonte	2019	1st term
Neil Ellis ‡	Liberal	Bay of Quinte	2015	2nd term
Nathaniel Erskine-Smith	Liberal	Beaches—East York	2015	2nd term
Ramesh Sangha	Liberal	Brampton Centre	2015	2nd term
Ramesh Sangha	Independent (Note: Expelled from caucus January 25, 2021)	Brampton Centre	2015	2nd term
Maninder Sidhu ‡	Liberal	Brampton East	2019	1st term
Ruby Sahota	Liberal	Brampton North	2015	2nd term
Sonia Sidhu	Liberal	Brampton South	2015	2nd term
Kamal Khera ‡	Liberal	Brampton West	2015	2nd term
Phil McColeman	Conservative	Brantford—Brant	2008	4th term
Alex Ruff	Conservative	Bruce—Grey—Owen Sound	2019	1st term
**Karina Gould**	Liberal	Burlington	2015	2nd term
Bryan May	Liberal	Cambridge	2015	2nd term
Pierre Poilievre	Conservative	Carleton	2004	6th term
Dave Epp	Conservative	Chatham-Kent—Leamington	2019	1st term
Julie Dzerowicz	Liberal	Davenport	2015	2nd term
Yasmin Ratansi	Liberal	Don Valley East	2004, 2015	5th term*
Yasmin Ratansi	Independent (Note: Resigned from caucus November 9, 2020)	Don Valley East	2004, 2015	5th term*
Han Dong	Liberal	Don Valley North	2019	1st term
Rob Oliphant ‡	Liberal	Don Valley West	2008, 2015	3rd term*
Kyle Seeback	Conservative	Dufferin—Caledon	2011, (Note: Brampton West) 2019	2nd term*
Erin O'Toole (Note: Conservative leader since August 24, 2020)	Conservative	Durham	2012	3rd term
**Marco Mendicino**	Liberal	Eglinton—Lawrence	2015	2nd term
Karen Vecchio	Conservative	Elgin—Middlesex—London	2015	2nd term
Chris Lewis	Conservative	Essex	2019	1st term
Yvan Baker	Liberal	Etobicoke Centre	2019	1st term
James Maloney	Liberal	Etobicoke—Lakeshore	2015	2nd term
Kirsty Duncan	Liberal	Etobicoke North	2008	4th term
David Sweet	Conservative	Flamborough—Glanbrook	2006	5th term
Francis Drouin	Liberal	Glengarry—Prescott—Russell	2015	2nd term
Lloyd Longfield	Liberal	Guelph	2015	2nd term
Diane Finley (until May 11, 2021)	Conservative	Haldimand—Norfolk	2004	6th term
Vacant		Haldimand—Norfolk	2004	6th term
Jamie Schmale	Conservative	Haliburton—Kawartha Lakes—Brock	2015	2nd term
Matthew Green	New Democratic	Hamilton Centre	2019	1st term
Bob Bratina	Liberal	Hamilton East—Stoney Creek	2015	2nd term
Scott Duvall	New Democratic	Hamilton Mountain	2015	2nd term
**Filomena Tassi**	Liberal	Hamilton West—Ancaster—Dundas	2015	2nd term
Derek Sloan	Conservative	Hastings—Lennox and Addington	2019	1st term
Derek Sloan	Independent (Note: Expelled from caucus January 20, 2021)	Hastings—Lennox and Addington	2019	1st term
Judy Sgro	Liberal	Humber River—Black Creek	1999	8th term
Ben Lobb	Conservative	Huron—Bruce	2008	4th term
Karen McCrimmon	Liberal	Kanata—Carleton	2015	2nd term
Eric Melillo	Conservative	Kenora	2019	1st term
**Deb Schulte**	Liberal	King—Vaughan	2015	2nd term
Mark Gerretsen	Liberal	Kingston and the Islands	2015	2nd term
Raj Saini	Liberal	Kitchener Centre	2015	2nd term
Tim Louis	Liberal	Kitchener—Conestoga	2019	1st term
Marwan Tabbara	Liberal	Kitchener South—Hespeler	2015	2nd term
Marwan Tabbara	Independent (Note: Resigned from caucus June 6, 2020)	Kitchener South—Hespeler	2015	2nd term
Lianne Rood	Conservative	Lambton—Kent—Middlesex	2019	1st term
Scott Reid	Conservative	Lanark—Frontenac—Kingston	2000	7th term
Michael Barrett	Conservative	Leeds—Grenville—Thousand Islands and Rideau Lakes	2018	2nd term
Lindsay Mathyssen	New Democratic	London—Fanshawe	2019	1st term
Peter Fragiskatos	Liberal	London North Centre	2015	2nd term
Kate Young ‡	Liberal	London West	2015	2nd term
Helena Jaczek	Liberal	Markham—Stouffville	2019	1st term
**Mary Ng**	Liberal	Markham—Thornhill	2017	2nd term
Bob Saroya	Conservative	Markham—Unionville	2015	2nd term
Adam van Koeverden ‡	Liberal	Milton	2019	1st term
**Omar Alghabra** ‡	Liberal	Mississauga Centre	2006, 2015	3rd term*
Peter Fonseca	Liberal	Mississauga East—Cooksville	2015	2nd term
Iqra Khalid	Liberal	Mississauga—Erin Mills	2015	2nd term
Sven Spengemann	Liberal	Mississauga—Lakeshore	2015	2nd term
**Navdeep Bains**	Liberal	Mississauga—Malton	2004, 2015	5th term*
Gagan Sikand	Liberal	Mississauga—Streetsville	2015	2nd term
Chandra Arya	Liberal	Nepean	2015	2nd term
Tony Van Bynen	Liberal	Newmarket—Aurora	2019	1st term
Vance Badawey	Liberal	Niagara Centre	2015	2nd term
Tony Baldinelli	Conservative	Niagara Falls	2019	1st term
Dean Allison	Conservative	Niagara West	2004	6th term
Marc Serré ‡	Liberal	Nickel Belt	2015	2nd term
Anthony Rota †	Liberal	Nipissing—Timiskaming	2004, 2015	5th term*
Philip Lawrence	Conservative	Northumberland—Peterborough South	2019	1st term
**Anita Anand**	Liberal	Oakville	2019	1st term
Pam Damoff	Liberal	Oakville North—Burlington ‡	2015	2nd term
Marie-France Lalonde ‡	Liberal	Orléans	2019	1st term
Colin Carrie	Conservative	Oshawa	2004	6th term
**Catherine McKenna**	Liberal	Ottawa Centre	2015	2nd term
David McGuinty	Liberal	Ottawa South	2004	6th term
**Mona Fortier**	Liberal	Ottawa—Vanier	2017	2nd term
Anita Vandenbeld ‡	Liberal	Ottawa West—Nepean	2015	2nd term
Dave MacKenzie	Conservative	Oxford	2004	6th term
Arif Virani ‡	Liberal	Parkdale—High Park	2015	2nd term
Scott Aitchison	Conservative	Parry Sound-Muskoka	2019	1st term
John Nater	Conservative	Perth Wellington	2015	2nd term
**Maryam Monsef**	Liberal	Peterborough—Kawartha	2015	2nd term
Jennifer O'Connell ‡	Liberal	Pickering—Uxbridge	2015	2nd term
Cheryl Gallant	Conservative	Renfrew—Nipissing—Pembroke	2000	7th term
Majid Jowhari	Liberal	Richmond Hill	2015	2nd term
Chris Bittle ‡	Liberal	St. Catharines	2015	2nd term
Marilyn Gladu	Conservative	Sarnia—Lambton	2015	2nd term
Terry Sheehan ‡	Liberal	Sault Ste. Marie	2015	2nd term
Jean Yip	Liberal	Scarborough—Agincourt	2017	2nd term
Salma Zahid	Liberal	Scarborough Centre	2015	2nd term
John McKay	Liberal	Scarborough-Guildwood	1997	8th term
Shaun Chen	Liberal	Scarborough North	2015	2nd term
Gary Anandasangaree ‡	Liberal	Scarborough—Rouge Park	2015	2nd term
**Bill Blair**	Liberal	Scarborough Southwest	2015	2nd term
Terry Dowdall	Conservative	Simcoe—Grey	2019	1st term
Bruce Stanton	Conservative	Simcoe North	2006	5th term
Adam Vaughan ‡	Liberal	Spadina—Fort York	2014	3rd term
Eric Duncan	Conservative	Stormont—Dundas—South Glengarry	2019	1st term
Paul Lefebvre ‡	Liberal	Sudbury	2015	2nd term
Peter Kent	Conservative	Thornhill	2008	4th term
Marcus Powlowski	Liberal	Thunder Bay—Rainy River	2019	1st term
**Patty Hajdu**	Liberal	Thunder Bay—Superior North	2015	2nd term
Charlie Angus	New Democratic	Timmins-James Bay	2004	6th term
**Bill Morneau** (until August 17, 2020)	Liberal	Toronto Centre	2015	2nd term
Marci Ien (elected October 26, 2020)	Liberal	Toronto Centre	2020	1st term
Julie Dabrusin ‡	Liberal	Toronto—Danforth	2015	2nd term
**Carolyn Bennett**	Liberal	Toronto—St. Paul's	1997	8th term
**Chrystia Freeland**	Liberal	University—Rosedale	2013	3rd term
Francesco Sorbara ‡	Liberal	Vaughan—Woodbridge	2015	2nd term
**Bardish Chagger**	Liberal	Waterloo	2015	2nd term
Michael Chong	Conservative	Wellington—Halton Hills	2004	6th term
Ryan Turnbull	Liberal	Whitby	2019	1st term
Ali Ehsassi ‡	Liberal	Willowdale	2015	2nd term
Irek Kusmierczyk ‡	Liberal	Windsor—Tecumseh	2019	1st term
Brian Masse	New Democratic	Windsor West	2002	7th term
Michael Levitt (until September 1, 2020)	Liberal	York Centre	2015	2nd term
Ya'ara Saks (elected October 26, 2020)	Liberal	York Centre	2020	1st term
Scot Davidson	Conservative	York—Simcoe	2019	2nd term
**Ahmed Hussen**	Liberal	York South—Weston	2015	2nd term

=== Prince Edward Island ===
Name	Party	Electoral district	First elected/previously elected	No. of terms
**Lawrence MacAulay**	Liberal	Cardigan	1988	10th term
Sean Casey	Liberal	Charlottetown	2011	3rd term
Bobby Morrissey	Liberal	Egmont	2015	2nd term
Wayne Easter	Liberal	Malpeque	1993	9th term

=== Quebec ===
Name	Party	Electoral district	First elected/previously elected	No. of terms
Sylvie Bérubé	Bloc Québécois	Abitibi—Baie-James—Nunavik—Eeyou	2019	1st term
Sébastien Lemire	Bloc Québécois	Abitibi—Témiscamingue	2019	1st term
**Mélanie Joly**	Liberal	Ahuntsic-Cartierville	2015	2nd term
Angelo Iacono	Liberal	Alfred-Pellan	2015	2nd term
Stéphane Lauzon ‡	Liberal	Argenteuil—La Petite-Nation	2015	2nd term
Kristina Michaud	Bloc Québécois	Avignon—La Mitis—Matane—Matapédia	2019	1st term
Richard Lehoux	Conservative	Beauce	2019	1st term
Caroline Desbiens	Bloc Québécois	Beauport—Côte-de-Beaupré—Île d'Orléans—Charlevoix	2019	1st term
Julie Vignola	Bloc Québécois	Beauport—Limoilou	2019	1st term
Louis Plamondon	Bloc Québécois	Bécancour—Nicolet—Saurel	1984 (Note: First elected as a Progressive Conservative)	11th term
Steven Blaney	Conservative	Bellechasse—Les Etchemins—Lévis	2006	5th term
Yves-François Blanchet	Bloc Québécois	Beloeil—Chambly	2019	1st term
Yves Perron	Bloc Québécois	Berthier—Maskinongé	2019	1st term
Emmanuel Dubourg	Liberal	Bourassa	2013	3rd term
Lyne Bessette	Liberal	Brome—Missisquoi	2019	1st term
Alexandra Mendès	Liberal	Brossard—Saint-Lambert	2008, 2015	3rd term*
Pierre Paul-Hus	Conservative	Charlesbourg—Haute-Saint-Charles	2015	2nd term
Brenda Shanahan	Liberal	Châteauguay—Lacolle	2015	2nd term
Richard Martel	Conservative	Chicoutimi—Le Fjord	2018	2nd term
**Marie-Claude Bibeau**	Liberal	Compton—Stanstead	2015	2nd term
Anju Dhillon	Liberal	Dorval—Lachine—LaSalle	2015	2nd term
Martin Champoux	Bloc Québécois	Drummond	2019	1st term
**Diane Lebouthillier**	Liberal	Gaspésie—Les Îles-de-la-Madeleine	2015	2nd term
Steven MacKinnon ‡	Liberal	Gatineau	2015	2nd term
Soraya Martinez Ferrada ‡	Liberal	Hochelaga	2019	1st term
**Pablo Rodríguez**	Liberal	Honoré-Mercier	2004, 2015	5th term*
Greg Fergus ‡	Liberal	Hull—Aylmer	2015	2nd term
Gabriel Ste-Marie	Bloc Québécois	Joliette	2015	2nd term
Mario Simard	Bloc Québécois	Jonquière	2019	1st term
Mario Beaulieu	Bloc Québécois	La Pointe-de-l'Île	2015	2nd term
Alain Therrien	Bloc Québécois	La Prairie	2019	1st term
Alexis Brunelle-Duceppe	Bloc Québécois	Lac-Saint-Jean	2019	1st term
Francis Scarpaleggia	Liberal	Lac-Saint-Louis	2004	6th term
**David Lametti**	Liberal	LaSalle—Émard—Verdun	2015	2nd term
Marie-Hélène Gaudreau	Bloc Québécois	Laurentides—Labelle	2019	1st term
**Steven Guilbeault**	Liberal	Laurier—Sainte-Marie	2019	1st term
Fayçal El-Khoury	Liberal	Laval—Les Îles	2015	2nd term
Jacques Gourde	Conservative	Lévis—Lotbinière	2006	5th term
Sherry Romanado	Liberal	Longueuil—Charles-LeMoyne	2015	2nd term
Denis Trudel	Bloc Québécois	Longueuil—Saint-Hubert	2019	1st term
Joël Lightbound ‡	Liberal	Louis-Hébert	2015	2nd term
Gérard Deltell	Conservative	Louis-Saint-Laurent	2015	2nd term
Marilène Gill	Bloc Québécois	Manicouagan	2015	2nd term
Yves Robillard	Liberal	Marc-Aurèle-Fortin	2015	2nd term
Luc Berthold	Conservative	Mégantic—L'Érable	2015	2nd term
Simon Marcil	Bloc Québécois	Mirabel	2015	2nd term
Stéphane Bergeron	Bloc Québécois	Montarville	1993, (Note: Verchères/Verchères—Les Patriotes) 2019	5th term*
Luc Thériault	Bloc Québécois	Montcalm	2015	2nd term
Bernard Généreux	Conservative	Montmagny—L'Islet—Kamouraska—Rivière-du-Loup	2009, 2015	3rd term*
Anthony Housefather ‡	Liberal	Mount Royal	2015	2nd term
**Marc Garneau**	Liberal	Notre-Dame-de-Grâce—Westmount	2008	4th term
Rachel Bendayan ‡	Liberal	Outremont	2019	2nd term
**Justin Trudeau**	Liberal	Papineau	2008	4th term
Xavier Barsalou-Duval	Bloc Québécois	Pierre-Boucher—Les Patriotes—Verchères	2015	2nd term
Sameer Zuberi	Liberal	Pierrefonds—Dollard	2019	1st term
Will Amos ‡	Liberal	Pontiac	2015	2nd term
Joël Godin	Conservative	Portneuf—Jacques-Cartier	2015	2nd term
**Jean-Yves Duclos**	Liberal	Québec	2015	2nd term
Monique Pauzé	Bloc Québécois	Repentigny	2015	2nd term
Alain Rayes	Conservative	Richmond—Arthabaska	2015	2nd term
Maxime Blanchette-Joncas	Bloc Québécois	Rimouski-Neigette—Témiscouata—Les Basques	2019	1st term
Luc Desilets	Bloc Québécois	Rivière-des-Mille-Îles	2019	1st term
Rhéal Fortin	Bloc Québécois	Rivière-du-Nord	2015	2nd term
Alexandre Boulerice	New Democratic	Rosemont—La Petite-Patrie	2011	3rd term
Simon-Pierre Savard-Tremblay	Bloc Québécois	Saint-Hyacinthe—Bagot	2019	1st term
Christine Normandin	Bloc Québécois	Saint-Jean	2019	1st term
Emmanuella Lambropoulos	Liberal	Saint-Laurent	2017	2nd term
Patricia Lattanzio	Liberal	Saint-Léonard—Saint-Michel	2019	1st term
**François-Philippe Champagne**	Liberal	Saint-Maurice—Champlain	2015	2nd term
Claude DeBellefeuille	Bloc Québécois	Salaberry—Suroît	2006, 2019	3rd term*
Andréanne Larouche	Bloc Québécois	Shefford	2019	1st term
Élisabeth Brière ‡	Liberal	Sherbrooke	2019	1st term
Michel Boudrias	Bloc Québécois	Terrebonne	2015	2nd term
Louise Chabot	Bloc Québécois	Thérèse-De Blainville	2019	1st term
Louise Charbonneau	Bloc Québécois	Trois-Rivières	2019	1st term
Peter Schiefke ‡	Liberal	Vaudreuil—Soulanges	2015	2nd term
**Marc Miller**	Liberal	Ville-Marie—Le Sud-Ouest—Île-des-Sœurs	2015	2nd term
Annie Koutrakis	Liberal	Vimy	2019	1st term

=== Saskatchewan ===
Name	Party	Electoral district	First elected/previously elected	No. of terms
Rosemarie Falk	Conservative	Battlefords—Lloydminster	2017	2nd term
Kelly Block	Conservative	Carlton Trail—Eagle Creek	2008	4th term
Jeremy Patzer	Conservative	Cypress Hills—Grasslands	2019	1st term
Gary Vidal	Conservative	Desnethé—Missinippi—Churchill River	2019	1st term
Tom Lukiwski	Conservative	Moose Jaw—Lake Centre—Lanigan	2004	6th term
Randy Hoback	Conservative	Prince Albert	2008	4th term
Warren Steinley	Conservative	Regina—Lewvan	2019	1st term
Andrew Scheer (Note: Conservative leader until August 24, 2020)	Conservative	Regina—Qu'Appelle	2004	6th term
Michael Kram	Conservative	Regina—Wascana	2019	1st term
Kevin Waugh	Conservative	Saskatoon—Grasswood	2015	2nd term
Corey Tochor	Conservative	Saskatoon—University	2019	1st term
Brad Redekopp	Conservative	Saskatoon West	2019	1st term
Robert Kitchen	Conservative	Souris—Moose Mountain	2015	2nd term
Cathay Wagantall	Conservative	Yorkton—Melville	2015	2nd term

=== Territories ===
Name	Party	Electoral district	First elected/previously elected	No. of terms
Michael McLeod	Liberal	Northwest Territories	2015	2nd term
Mumilaaq Qaqqaq	New Democratic	Nunavut	2019	1st term
Larry Bagnell	Liberal	Yukon	2000, 2015	6th term*

== Changes since the 2019 election ==
=== Membership changes ===
Date	District	Name	Party before	Party after	Reason
June 6, 2020	Kitchener South—Hespeler	Marwan Tabbara	Liberal	Independent	Resigned from Liberal caucus after being charged with assault, break and enter and criminal harassment
August 17, 2020	Toronto Centre	Bill Morneau	Liberal	Vacant	Resigned to run for Secretary-General of the OECD
September 1, 2020	York Centre	Michael Levitt	Liberal	Vacant	Resigned to become the president of the Canadian Friends of Simon Wiesenthal Centre for Holocaust Studies
October 26, 2020	Toronto Centre	Marci Ien	Vacant	Liberal	Elected in a by-election
October 26, 2020	York Centre	Ya'ara Saks	Vacant	Liberal	Elected in a by-election
November 9, 2020	Don Valley East	Yasmin Ratansi	Liberal	Independent	Resigned from Liberal caucus after a CBC News investigation revealed she had violated parliamentary rules on nepotism
January 20, 2021	Hastings—Lennox and Addington	Derek Sloan	Conservative	Independent	Expelled from the Conservative caucus for accepting a donation from white nationalist Paul Fromm as well as numerous other incidents
January 25, 2021	Brampton Centre	Ramesh Sangha	Liberal	Independent	Expelled from the Liberal caucus after making controversial comments about fellow MPs
May 11, 2021	Haldimand—Norfolk	Diane Finley	Conservative	Vacant	Resigned
June 10, 2021	Fredericton	Jenica Atwin	Green	Liberal	Changed affiliation in part due to party infighting

=== Standings ===
Number of members per party by date	2019	2020					2021			
Number of members per party by date	Oct 21	Jun 6	Aug 17	Sep 1	Oct 26	Nov 10	Jan 20	Jan 25	May 11	Jun 10
Liberal	157	156	155	154	156	155		154		155
Conservative	121						120		119	
Bloc Québécois	32									
New Democratic	24									
Green	3									2
Independent	1	2				3	4	5		
Total members	338		337	336	338				337	
Government majority	-13	-14	-15	-16	-14	-15		-16	-15	-14
Vacant	0		1	2	0				1	
