= Fernand Picard =

Fernand Picard may refer to:

- Fernand Picard (politician)
- Fernand Picard (engineer)
