= Andrew Kania =

Canadian politician

Andrew J. Kania

Member of Parliament for Brampton West
- In office 2008–2011
- Preceded by: Colleen Beaumier
- Succeeded by: Kyle Seeback

Personal details
- Born: December 7, 1967 (age 58) Toronto, Ontario, Canada
- Party: Liberal
- Spouse: Susan Kania
- Education: University of Toronto, University of Leicester
- Profession: Senior partner, Kania Lawyers

Andrew Kania (born December 7, 1967) is a former Canadian Member of Parliament for the electoral district of Brampton West, in Ontario. Kania was elected in the 2008 Canadian federal election, winning as the Liberal Party candidate in the riding vacated by Liberal Colleen Beaumier. He was defeated in his re-election bid by Conservative Kyle Seeback in the 2011 Canadian federal election.

Kania was a member of the Standing Committee on Public Safety and National Security; the Liaison Committee, which has a supervisory role over all parliamentary committees; and also the House Joint Chair of the Standing Joint Committee for the Scrutiny of Regulations.

He ran as the Ontario Liberal Party candidate during the 2025 Ontario general election in the riding of Brampton West.. He lost to Progressive Conservative incumbent Amarjot Sandhu.

== Biography ==
Kania received his first law degree from the University of Toronto and then completed his Master of Laws at University of Leicester. He joined the Ontario Bar in 1991. Kania was elected secretary of the Ontario Bar Association, which represents more than 17,000 lawyers. He was also a past instructor of law at the Bar Admission Course at the Law Society of Upper Canada.

Kania was the outreach director and Ontario co-chair for Stéphane Dion's 2006 leadership campaign, and the national outreach director for Michael Ignatieff's 2008 leadership campaign.

He sought the Conservative Party of Canada nomination in the 2019 Canadian federal election for Brampton South.

== Electoral record ==
=== Federal ===
2011 Canadian federal election: Brampton West
Party	Candidate	Votes	%	±%	Expenditures
Conservative	Kyle Seeback	28,320	44.75	+4.9	
Liberal	Andrew Kania	22,128	34.97	-5.3	
New Democratic	Jagtar Shergill	11,225	17.74	+4.1	
Green	Avtaar Soor	1,224	1.93	-4.3	
Independent	Theodore Koum Njoh	387	0.61	–	
Total valid votes		63,284	100%		
Total rejected ballots		400	0.63	–	
Turnout		63,684	55.12	–	
Eligible voters		115,545	–		
Conservative gain from Liberal		Swing		+5.1	

2008 Canadian federal election: Brampton West
Party	Candidate	Votes	%	±%	Expenditures
Liberal	Andrew Kania	21,746	40.3	-8.8	$101,467
Conservative	Kyle Seeback	21,515	39.9	+4.2	$103,283
New Democratic	Jagtar Shergill	7,334	13.6	+2.5	$21,521
Green	Patti Chemelyk	3,329	6.2	+2.1	$92
Total valid votes/expense limit		53,924	100.0	$103,318	
Total rejected ballots		347	0.6		
Turnout		54,271			
Liberal hold		Swing		-6.5	

Note: As certified on 5 November 2008 after a recount.

=== Provincial ===
2025 Ontario general election: Brampton West
Party	Candidate	Votes	%	±%
Progressive Conservative	Amarjot Sandhu	19,028	56.58	+8.74
Liberal	Andrew Kania	10,933	32.51	+6.27
New Democratic	Samuel Sarjeant	1,981	5.89	–14.86
Green	Ethan Russell	877	2.61	–0.16
New Blue	David Pardy	554	1.65	–0.01
Independent	Pushpek Sidhu	260	0.77	–
Total valid votes		33,633	99.54	
Total rejected, unmarked and declined ballots		157	0.46	–0.01
Turnout		33,790	34.77	+0.58
Eligible voters		97,171		
Progressive Conservative hold		Swing		+1.23
Source: Elections Ontario
