= David Heurtel =

Canadian politician

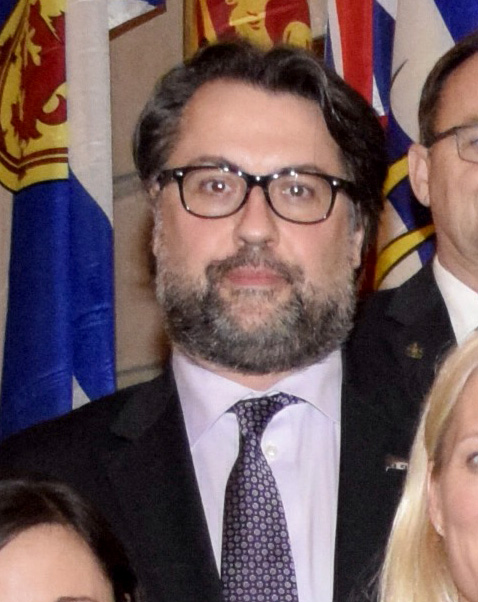

Minister of Immigration, Diversity, and Inclusion
- In office October 11, 2017 – October 18, 2018
- Preceded by: Kathleen Weil
- Succeeded by: Simon Jolin-Barrette

Minister of Sustainable Development, Environment, and the Fight Against Climate Change
- In office April 23, 2014 – October 11, 2017
- Preceded by: Yves-François Blanchet
- Succeeded by: Isabelle Melançon

Member of the National Assembly of Quebec for Viau
- In office December 9, 2013 – August 29, 2018
- Preceded by: Emmanuel Dubourg
- Succeeded by: Frantz Benjamin

Personal details
- Born: July 20, 1971 (age 55) Montreal, Quebec
- Party: Quebec Liberal (provincial)

David Heurtel is a Canadian politician, who was elected to the National Assembly of Quebec in a by-election on December 9, 2013. He represented the electoral district of Viau as a member of the Quebec Liberal Party. He was re-elected in the 2014 election. During his tenure in the National Assembly he held the portfolios of environment minister and immigration minister. He declined to run in the 2018 provincial election.

== Electoral record ==
2014 Quebec general election
Party	Candidate	Votes	%	±%
Liberal	David Heurtel	15,945	62.02	+2.21
Parti Québécois	Odette Lavigne	3,782	14.71	+0.15
Québec solidaire	Geneviève Fortier-Moreau	2,795	10.87	-2.41
Coalition Avenir Québec	Wilner Cayo	2,380	9.26	+5.87
Green	Marijo Bourgault	304	1.18	-0.49
Parti nul	Benoit Valiquette	181	0.70	–
Option nationale	Benjamin Michaud	177	0.69	-3.38
Bloc Pot	Ana Da Silva	145	0.56	–
Total valid votes		25,709	98.62	–
Total rejected ballots		360	1.38	–
Turnout		26,069	63.0	+46.0
Electors on the lists		41,161	–	–
Liberal hold		Swing		–

Quebec provincial by-election, December 9, 2013
Party	Candidate	Votes	%	±%
Liberal	David Heurtel	4,047	59.88	+12.61
Parti Québécois	Tania Longpré	985	14.58	-9.09
Québec solidaire	Geneviève Fortier-Moreau	897	13.27	+1.75
Option nationale	Patrick Bourgeois	309	4.57	+1.60
Coalition Avenir Québec	Jamilla Leboeuf	229	3.39	-9.06
Green	Morgan Crockett	113	1.67	-0.45
Quebec Citizens' Union	Emilio Alvarez Garcia	82	1.21	
Conservative	Jean-Paul Pellerin	82	1.21	
Autonomist Team	Stéphane Pouleur	14	0.21	
Total valid votes		6,758		–
Total rejected ballots		100	1.46	–
Turnout		6,858	17.00	
Electors on the lists		40,518	–	–
Liberal hold		Swing		+10.85
