= William Cusano =

Canadian politician

Member of the National Assembly of Quebec for Viau
- In office April 13, 1981 – March 26, 2007
- Preceded by: Charles-A. Lefebvre
- Succeeded by: Emmanuel Dubourg

Personal details
- Born: October 19, 1943 Sepino, Campobasso, Italy
- Died: November 14, 2012 (aged 69) Montreal, Quebec, Canada
- Party: Liberal

William Cusano (October 19, 1943 – November 14, 2012) was an Italian-born former politician in Quebec, Canada. He was a member of the National Assembly of Quebec from 1981 to 2007.

Born in Sepino-Campobasso, Italy, Cusano and his family moved to Canada in 1952. He has a Bachelor of Arts from Loyola College as well as from the Université de Montréal in education and was a teacher and director for several schools in the Montreal region from 1962 to 1979.

Cusano was first elected to the National Assembly as a member of the Quebec Liberal Party in the Viau riding in the 1981 elections. He was re-elected in 1985, 1989, 1994, 1998 and 2003 before retiring at the 2007 elections. Cusano highest rank was chief whip of the government during Robert Bourassa's fourth term as Premier of Quebec from 1989 to 1994, while he was the Deputy Whip of the government from 1985 to 1989. Cusano was never named to the Cabinet by Bourassa, Daniel Johnson, Jr. or Jean Charest serving as Parliamentary Secretary of the Minister of Health and Social Services during Johnson's tenure as Premier in 1994.

During Jean Charest's First Mandate, he was named the National Assembly's First Vice-President.

He died in 2012 of complications from surgery.

== Electoral record (partial) ==
2003 Quebec general election: Viau
Party	Candidate	Votes	%	±%
Liberal	William Cusano	17,703	65.13	
Parti Québécois	Maka Kotto	6,142	22.60	
Action démocratique	Paolo Tamburello	2,406	8.85	
Bloc Pot	Guillaume Blouin-Beaudoin	426	1.57	
UFP	Jocelyn Dupuis	384	1.41	–
Non-affiliated	Yannick Duguay	121	0.45	
Total valid votes		27,182	100.00	
Rejected and declined votes		524		
Turnout		27,706	62.81	
Electors on the lists		44,113		
Source: Official Results, Le Directeur général des élections du Québec.

1998 Quebec general election: Viau
Party	Candidate	Votes	%
Liberal	William Cusano	18,774	70.08
Action démocratique	Luc Leclerc	5,214	19.46
Bloc Pot	Guillaume Blouin-Beaudoin	1,668	6.23
Socialist Democracy	Caroline Perron	426	1.59
Innovator	Patrick Ravet	326	1.22
Communist	Kostas Miritis	207	0.77
Equality	Jean-Paul Savoie	174	0.65
Total valid votes		26,789	100.00
Rejected and declined votes		1,111	
Turnout		27,900	73.54
Electors on the lists		37,936	
Source: Official Results, Le Directeur général des élections du Québec.

1994 Quebec general election: Viau
Party	Candidate	Votes	%	±%
Liberal	William Cusano	17,946	63.19	
Parti Québécois	Raphaël Delli Gatti	8,463	29.80	
New Democratic	Paul Montpetit	1,482	5.22	
Natural Law	Pierre Bergeron	291	1.02	
Innovator	Claire Cartier	218	0.77	
Total valid votes		28,400	100.00	
Rejected and declined votes		605		
Turnout		29,005	79.73	
Electors on the lists		36,378		
Source: Official Results, Le Directeur général des élections du Québec.

1985 Quebec general election: Viau
Party	Candidate	Votes	%
Liberal	William Cusano	17,086	66.12
Parti Québécois	Marie-Claire Nivolon	7,428	28.75
New Democratic	Giuseppe Sciortino	864	3.34
Humanist	Doris Gervais	196	0.76
Commonwealth of Canada	Martin Daoust	148	0.57
Christian Socialist	Jean-François Grenier	118	0.46
Total valid votes		25,840	
Rejected and declined votes		491	
Turnout		26,331	71.05
Electors on the lists		37,062	
Source: Official Results, Le Directeur général des élections du Québec.
