= Viau =

Provincial electoral district in Quebec, Canada

Coordinates: 45.58°N 73.61°W

Quebec electoral district
- Location in Montreal

Provincial electoral district
- Legislature: National Assembly of Quebec
MNA
Frantz Benjamin
Liberal
- District created: 1972
- First contested: 1973
- Last contested: 2026

Demographics
- Population (2006): 69,069
- Electors (2014): 41,161
- Area (km²): 10.2
- Pop. density (per km²): 6,771.5
- Census division: Montreal (part)
- Census subdivision: Montreal (part)

Viau (French pronunciation: [vjo]) is a provincial electoral district in the city of Montreal in Quebec, Canada, that elects members to the National Assembly of Quebec. It consists of the Districts of Saint-Michel and François-Perrault (east of Papineau Avenue) in the Borough of Villeray–Saint-Michel–Parc-Extension in Montreal.

It was created for the 1973 election from parts of Dorion, Gouin, Jeanne-Mance, and Olier electoral districts.

In the change from the 2001 to the 2011 electoral map, its territory was unchanged.

The riding is named after former Quebec businessman Charles-Théodore Viau, founder of the Biscuits Viau company.

== Members of the National Assembly ==
Legislature	Years	Member	Party
Riding created from Dorion, Gouin, Jeanne-Mance and Olier
30th	1973–1976	Fernand Picard	Liberal
31st	1976–1981	Charles Lefebvre	Parti Québécois
32nd	1981–1985	William Cusano	Liberal
33rd	1985–1989	William Cusano	Liberal
34th	1989–1994	William Cusano	Liberal
35th	1994–1998	William Cusano	Liberal
36th	1998–2003	William Cusano	Liberal
37th	2003–2007	William Cusano	Liberal
38th	2007–2008	Emmanuel Dubourg	Liberal
39th	2008–2012	Emmanuel Dubourg	Liberal
40th	2012–2013	Emmanuel Dubourg	Liberal
40th	2013–2014	David Heurtel	Liberal
41st	2014–2018	David Heurtel	Liberal
42nd	2018–2022	Frantz Benjamin	Liberal
43rd	2022–2026	Frantz Benjamin	Liberal
44th	2026–Present	Frantz Benjamin	Liberal

== Election results ==
2026 Quebec general election
** Preliminary results — Not yet official **
Party	Candidate	Votes	%	±%
Liberal	Frantz Benjamin	8,697	42.45	
Québec solidaire	Saïd Kassabie	5,861	28.60	
Parti Québécois	Clara Bélisle	2,895	14.3	
Conservative	Venel Aladin	1,447	7.06	
Coalition Avenir Québec	Frane Bisseck	977	4.77	
Green	Manel Chaouche	203	0.99	
Canadian	Afruza Hossain	164	0.80	
Parti nul	Renaud Boisvert	97	0.47	
Independent	Mario Bellavance	91	0.44	
Communist	Normand Raymond	58	0.28	
Total valid votes				
Total rejected ballots				
Turnout			52.92	
Liberal hold		Swing		
Source: Élections Québec

2022 Quebec general election
Party	Candidate	Votes	%	±%
Liberal	Frantz Benjamin	8,049	38.18	-8.45
Québec solidaire	Renée-Chantal Belinga	6,418	30.44	+6.11
Coalition Avenir Québec	Justine Savard	3,201	15.18	-0.55
Parti Québécois	Marc-Antoine Lecompte	1,598	7.58	-0.73
Conservative	Alex Tembel	1,294	6.14	+4.88
Green	Manel Chaouche	342	1.62	–
Bloc Montreal	Marc II Réjouis	100	0.47	–
Climat Québec	Serge Ricard	80	0.38	–
Total valid votes		21,082	97.84	–
Total rejected ballots		466	2.16	–
Turnout		21,548	54.03	
Electors on the lists		39,883	–	–

2018 Quebec general election
Party	Candidate	Votes	%	±%
Liberal	Frantz Benjamin	10,113	46.63	-15.39
Québec solidaire	Sylvain Lafrenière	5,276	24.33	+13.46
Coalition Avenir Québec	Janny Gaspard	3,411	15.73	+6.47
Parti Québécois	Mounddy Sanon	1,803	8.31	-6.40
New Democratic	Mamoun Ahmed	494	2.28	–
Conservative	Patrick St-Onge	274	1.26	–
Bloc Pot	Hugo Pépino	162	0.75	+0.19
Independent	Beverly Bernardo	153	0.71	–
Total valid votes		21,686	97.45	
Total rejected ballots		568	2.55	
Turnout		22,254	53.44	-9.89
Eligible voters		41,646		
Liberal hold		Swing		-14.43
Source(s) "Rapport des résultats officiels du scrutin". Élections Québec.

2014 Quebec general election
Party	Candidate	Votes	%	±%
Liberal	David Heurtel	15,945	62.02	+2.21
Parti Québécois	Odette Lavigne	3,782	14.71	+0.15
Québec solidaire	Geneviève Fortier-Moreau	2,795	10.87	-2.41
Coalition Avenir Québec	Wilner Cayo	2,380	9.26	+5.87
Green	Marijo Bourgault	304	1.18	-0.49
Parti nul	Benoit Valiquette	181	0.70	–
Option nationale	Benjamin Michaud	177	0.69	-3.38
Bloc Pot	Ana Da Silva	145	0.56	–
Total valid votes		25,709	98.62	–
Total rejected ballots		360	1.38	–
Turnout		26,069	63.33	+46.40
Electors on the lists		41,161	–	–
Liberal hold		Swing		–

Quebec provincial by-election, December 9, 2013
Party	Candidate	Votes	%	±%
Liberal	David Heurtel	4,047	59.89	+12.61
Parti Québécois	Tania Longpré	984	14.56	-9.10
Québec solidaire	Geneviève Fortier-Moreau	897	13.28	+1.76
Option nationale	Patrick Bourgeois	309	4.57	+1.60
Coalition Avenir Québec	Jamilla Leboeuf	229	3.39	-9.05
Green	Morgan Crockett	113	1.67	-0.46
Quebec Citizens' Union	Emilio Alvarez Garcia	82	1.21	–
Conservative	Jean-Paul Pellerin	82	1.21	–
Équipe Autonomiste	Stéphane Pouleur	14	0.21	–
Total valid votes		6,757	98.53	–
Total rejected ballots		101	1.47	–
Turnout		6,858	16.93	-45.42
Electors on the lists		40,518	–	–
Liberal hold		Swing		+10.86

2012 Quebec general election
Party	Candidate	Votes	%	±%
Liberal	Emmanuel Dubourg	11,788	47.28	-11.33
Parti Québécois	Gabriel Arbieto Munayco	5,900	23.66	-2.52
Coalition Avenir Québec	Walid Hadid	3,103	12.44	+5.95*
Québec solidaire	Geneviève Fortier-Moreau	2,873	11.52	+6.51
Option nationale	Simon-Pierre Bélanger	740	2.97	–
Green	Eric Perreault-Chamberland	530	2.13	-1.59
Total valid votes		24,934	98.48	–
Total rejected ballots		384	1.52	–
Turnout		25,318	62.35	+17.83
Electors on the lists		40,605	–	–
Liberal hold		Swing		-4.40

* Result compared to Action démocratique

2008 Quebec general election
Party	Candidate	Votes	%	±%
Liberal	Emmanuel Dubourg	10,705	58.60	+6.68
Parti Québécois	Martine Banolok	4,783	26.18	+4.45
Action démocratique	Martin Fournier	1,186	6.49	-10.22
Québec solidaire	Rosa Matilde Dutra	915	5.01	+0.06
Green	Michel Cummings	678	3.71	-0.99
Total valid votes		18,267	98.03	–
Total rejected ballots		368	1.97	–
Turnout		18,635	44.52	-14.81
Electors on the lists		41,859	–	–

2007 Quebec general election
Party	Candidate	Votes	%	±%
Liberal	Emmanuel Dubourg	12,917	51.92	-13.21
Parti Québécois	Naima Mimoune	5,406	21.73	-0.87
Action démocratique	Sylvie Fontaine	4,157	16.71	+7.86
Québec solidaire	Valérie Lavoie	1,231	4.95	+3.54*
Green	Simon Bernier	1,169	4.70	–
Total valid votes		24,880	98.39	–
Total rejected ballots		407	1.61	–
Turnout		25,287	59.33	-3.48
Electors on the lists		42,619	–	–

* Result compared to UFP

2003 Quebec general election
Party	Candidate	Votes	%	±%
Liberal	William Cusano	17,703	65.13	-4.95
Parti Québécois	Maka Kotto	6,142	22.60	–
Action démocratique	Paolo Tamburello	2,406	8.85	-10.61
Bloc Pot	Guillaume Blouin-Beaudoin	426	1.57	-4.66
UFP	Jocelyne Dupuis	384	1.41	–
No designation	Yannick Duguay	121	0.45	–

1998 Quebec general election
Party	Candidate	Votes	%	±%
Liberal	William Cusano	18,774	70.08	+6.89
Action démocratique	Luc Leclerc	5,214	19.46	–
Bloc Pot	Guillaume Blouin-Beaudoin	1,668	6.23	–
Socialist Democracy	Caroline Perron	426	1.59	-3.63
Innovator	Patrick Ravet	326	1.22	+0.45
Communist	Kostas Miritis	207	0.77	–
Equality	Jean-Paul Savoie	174	0.65	–
Parti Québécois	Aurèle Bourassa	Withdrew		

1995 Quebec referendum
Side	Votes	%
No	23,701	68.80
Yes	10,746	31.20

1994 Quebec general election
Party	Candidate	Votes	%	±%
Liberal	William Cusano	17,946	63.19	+1.71
Parti Québécois	Raphaël Delli Gatti	8,463	29.80	-1.83
New Democratic	Paul Montpetit	1,482	5.22	+1.02
Natural Law	Pierre Bergeron	291	1.02	–
Innovator	Claire Cartier	218	0.77	–

1992 Charlottetown Accord referendum
Side	Votes	%
Oui	15,803	60.84
Non	10,173	39.16

1989 Quebec general election
Party	Candidate	Votes	%	±%
Liberal	William Cusano	13,965	61.48	-4.64
Parti Québécois	André Comeau	7,184	31.63	+2.88
New Democratic	Raymond Gagnon	954	4.20	+0.86
Parti indépendantiste	Manon Robert	409	1.80	–
People's Front	Linda Michaud	204	0.90	–

1985 Quebec general election
Party	Candidate	Votes	%	±%
Liberal	William Cusano	17,086	66.12	+10.93
Parti Québécois	Marie-Claire Nivolon	7,428	28.75	-12.85
New Democratic	Giuseppe Sciortino	864	3.34	–
Humanist	Doris Gervais	196	0.76	–
Commonwealth of Canada	Martin Daoust	204	0.90	–
Christian Socialist	Jean-François Grenier	204	0.90	–

1981 Quebec general election
Party	Candidate	Votes	%	±%
Liberal	William Cusano	16,657	55.19	+17.96
Parti Québécois	Charles-A. Lefebvre	12,554	41.60	-1.84
Union Nationale	Roger Dominguez	574	1.90	-13.83
Workers Communist	Luigi D'Alonzo	161	0.53	–
Workers	Albani Laporte	107	0.36	–
Communist	Vittoria Bronzati	78	0.26	–
People's Front	André Gagnon	204	0.90	–

1980 Quebec referendum
Side	Votes	%
No	20,890	65.92
Yes	10,800	34.08

1976 Quebec general election
Party	Candidate	Votes	%	±%
Parti Québécois	Charles-A. Lefebvre	13,513	43.44	+6.11
Liberal	Fernand Sauvé	11,581	37.23	-19.45
Union Nationale	Antonio Marciano	4892	15.73	+13.92
Ralliement créditiste	Joseph Ouellet	760	2.44	-1.25
Parti national populaire	Luigino Mariano	361	1.16	–

1973 Quebec general election
Party	Candidate	Votes	%	±%
Liberal	Fernand Picard	16,404	56.68	–
Parti Québécois	Marie Dalaire Vallée	10,804	37.33	–
Parti Créditiste	Jean-M. Côté	1069	3.69	–
Union Nationale	Claude Cayer	525	1.81	–
Independent	Guy Côté	142	0.49	–

== See also ==
- List of Quebec provincial electoral districts
- Canadian provincial electoral districts
