= Frantz Benjamin =

Canadian politician

Frantz Benjamin MNA
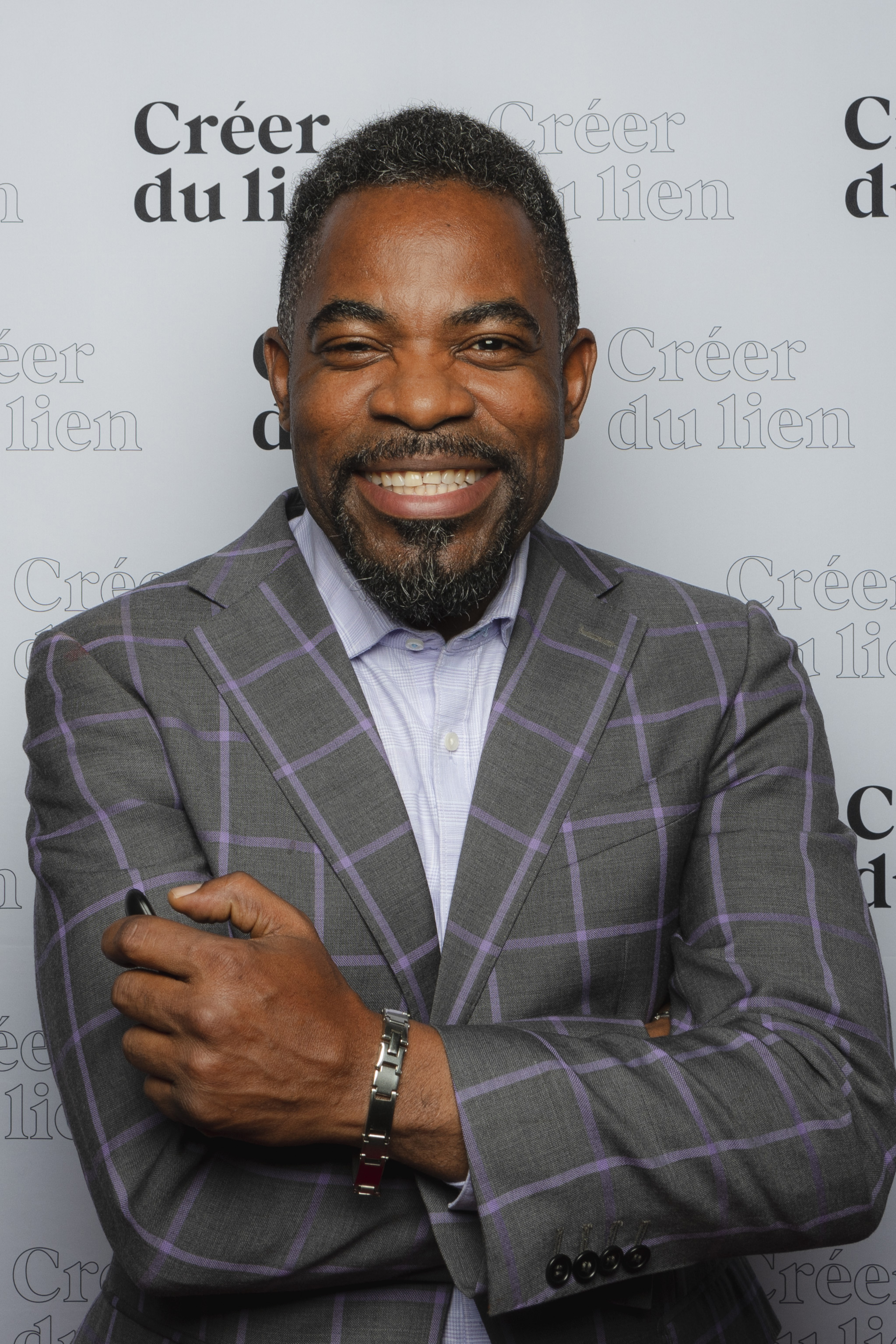
- Frantz Benjamin, November 2022

Member of the National Assembly of Quebec for Viau
- Incumbent
- Assumed office October 1, 2018
- Preceded by: David Heurtel

Montreal City Councillor for Saint-Michel
- In office November 1, 2009 – October 15, 2018
- Preceded by: Soraya Martinez Ferrada
- Succeeded by: Josué Corvil

Speaker of Montreal City Council
- In office 2013–2017
- Preceded by: Harout Chitilian
- Succeeded by: Cathy Wong
- Constituency: Saint-Michel

Personal details
- Born: Port-au-Prince, Haiti
- Party: Quebec Liberal Party
- Other political affiliations: Union Montreal (2009-2012); Independent (2012-2013); Ensemble Montréal (2013-present)

Frantz Benjamin is a Canadian politician and poet, who was elected to the National Assembly of Quebec in the 2018 provincial election. He represents the electoral district of Viau as a member of the Quebec Liberal Party. He is the third vice-president of the National Assembly since 29 November 2022.

== Municipal Politics ==
Benjamin was a member of the Commission scolaire de la Pointe-de-l'Île from 1998 to 2012.

Benjamin was first elected to the Montreal City Council in 2009 defeating incumbent city councillor Soraya Martinez Ferrada.

Benjamin formerly served as a member of Montreal City Council and the chairman (Speaker) of the city council, representing the district of Saint-Michel in the borough of Villeray–Saint-Michel–Parc-Extension. He was also the first black person to be speaker of the city council. Formerly associated with the Union Montreal political party, he resigned on October 30, 2012, in protest against the allegations of corruption surrounding mayor Gérald Tremblay at the Charbonneau commission hearings. He sat as an independent councillor until June 2013, when he reaffiliated with the new Équipe Denis Coderre.

== Electoral record ==
=== Provincial ===
2026 Quebec general election: Viau
** Preliminary results — Not yet official **
Party	Candidate	Votes	%	±%
Liberal	Frantz Benjamin	8,697	42.45	
Québec solidaire	Saïd Kassabie	5,861	28.60	
Parti Québécois	Clara Bélisle	2,895	14.3	
Conservative	Venel Aladin	1,447	7.06	
Coalition Avenir Québec	Frane Bisseck	977	4.77	
Green	Manel Chaouche	203	0.99	
Canadian	Afruza Hossain	164	0.80	
Parti nul	Renaud Boisvert	97	0.47	
Independent	Mario Bellavance	91	0.44	
Communist	Normand Raymond	58	0.28	
Total valid votes				
Total rejected ballots				
Turnout			52.92	
Liberal hold		Swing		
Source: Élections Québec

2022 Quebec general election: Viau
Party	Candidate	Votes	%	±%
Liberal	Frantz Benjamin	8,049	38.18	-8.45
Québec solidaire	Renée-Chantal Belinga	6,418	30.44	+6.11
Coalition Avenir Québec	Justine Savard	3,201	15.18	-0.55
Parti Québécois	Marc-Antoine Lecompte	1,598	7.58	-0.73
Conservative	Alex Tembel	1,294	6.14	+4.88
Green	Manel Chaouche	342	1.62	–
Bloc Montreal	Marc II Réjouis	100	0.47	–
Climat Québec	Serge Ricard	80	0.38	–
Total valid votes		21,082	97.84	–
Total rejected ballots		466	2.16	–
Turnout		21,548	54.03	
Electors on the lists		39,883	–	–

2018 Quebec general election: Viau
Party	Candidate	Votes	%	±%
Liberal	Frantz Benjamin	10,113	46.63	-15.39
Québec solidaire	Sylvain Lafrenière	5,276	24.33	+13.46
Coalition Avenir Québec	Janny Gaspard	3,411	15.73	+6.47
Parti Québécois	Mounddy Sanon	1,803	8.31	-6.40
New Democratic	Mamoun Ahmed	494	2.28	–
Conservative	Patrick St-Onge	274	1.26	–
Bloc Pot	Hugo Pépino	162	0.75	+0.19
Independent	Beverly Bernardo	153	0.71	–
Total valid votes		21,686	97.45	
Total rejected ballots		568	2.55	
Turnout		22,254	53.44	-9.89
Eligible voters		41,646		
Liberal hold		Swing		-14.43
Source(s) "Rapport des résultats officiels du scrutin". Élections Québec.

== Municipal ==
2017 Montreal municipal election: City Councillor-Saint-Michel
Party	Candidate	Votes	%	±%
Équipe Denis Coderre	Frantz Benjamin	3,882	61.95	+11.71
Projet Montréal	Rana Alrabi	2,384	30.85	+12.03
Total valid votes/expense limit		6,266	94.07	
Total rejected ballots		395	5.93	+0.42
Turnout		6,661	30.48	-2.99
Eligible voters		21 856	–	–

2013 Montreal municipal election: City Councillor-Saint-Michel
Party	Candidate	Votes	%	±%
Équipe Denis Coderre	Frantz Benjamin	3,390	50.24	+50.24
Projet Montréal	Isabelle Bernard	1,270	18.82	+5.47
Vrai changement	Emilio Alvarez Garcia	1,129	16.73	+16.73
Coalition Montréal	John De Luca	958	14.20	+14.20
Total valid votes/expense limit		6,747	94.85	
Total rejected ballots		366	5.15	-0.97
Turnout		7,113	33.47	+0.81
Eligible voters		21,255	–	–

2009 Montreal municipal election: City Councillor-Saint-Michel
Party	Candidate	Votes	%	±%
Union Montreal	Frantz Benjamin	2,898	43.41	-1.80
Vision Montreal	Soraya Martinez Ferrada	2,478	37.12	-5.86
Projet Montréal	Jack Thierry Morency	891	13.35	+1.54
Montréal Ville-Marie	Valentino Nelson	409	6.13	–
Total valid votes/expense limit		6,676	93.38	–
Total rejected ballots		435	6.12	–
Turnout		7,111	32.66	–
Eligible voters		21,770	–	–

== Literary works ==
- Valkanday : pwezi, Montréal, Éditions Paroles. 2000, 48 p. (ISBN 2-922726-00-2)
- Chants de mémoire, Montréal, Éditions Paroles, 2003.
- Dits d'errance, Montréal, Mémoire d'encrier, 2004, 67 p. (ISBN 2-923153-06-5)
- Montréal vu par ses poètes (with Rodney Saint-Éloi). Montréal. Mémoire d'encrier, 2006. (ISBN 2-923153-48-0)
- Lettres d'automne / Tanlapli. Montréal, Éditions Paroles, 2007. (ISBN 978-2-922726-18-3)
- Mémoire d'encrier, Octobre 4 2010 (ISBN 978-2-923713-36-6)
- Le Saint-Michel des Haïtiens : perspectives sur la trajectoire de la communauté haïtienne du Québec dans un quartier de Montréal, Montréal, Les Éditions du CIDIHCA, 2012, 186 p. (ISBN 9782894543832)
- Une femme à la mer, Montréal, Mémoire d'encrier, 2016, (ISBN 9782897122874)
- Nuit des anses pleines, Montréal, Mémoire d'encrier, 2021, 58 p. (ISBN 9782897127589)
