= Brampton West (federal electoral district) =

Federal electoral district in Ontario, Canada

Coordinates: 43.693°N 79.840°W

Ontario electoral district
- Interactive map of riding boundaries from the 2025 federal election

Federal electoral district
- Legislature: House of Commons
MP
Amarjeet Gill
Conservative
- District created: 2003
- First contested: 2004
- Last contested: 2025
- District webpage: profile, map

Demographics
- Population (2016): 130,000
- Electors (2015): 68,796
- Area (km²): 57.92
- Pop. density (per km²): 2,244.5
- Census division: Peel
- Census subdivision: Brampton (part)

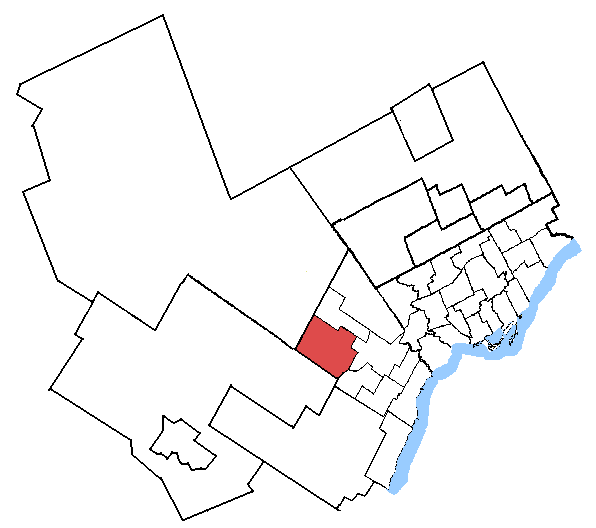
Brampton West 2003 to 2015

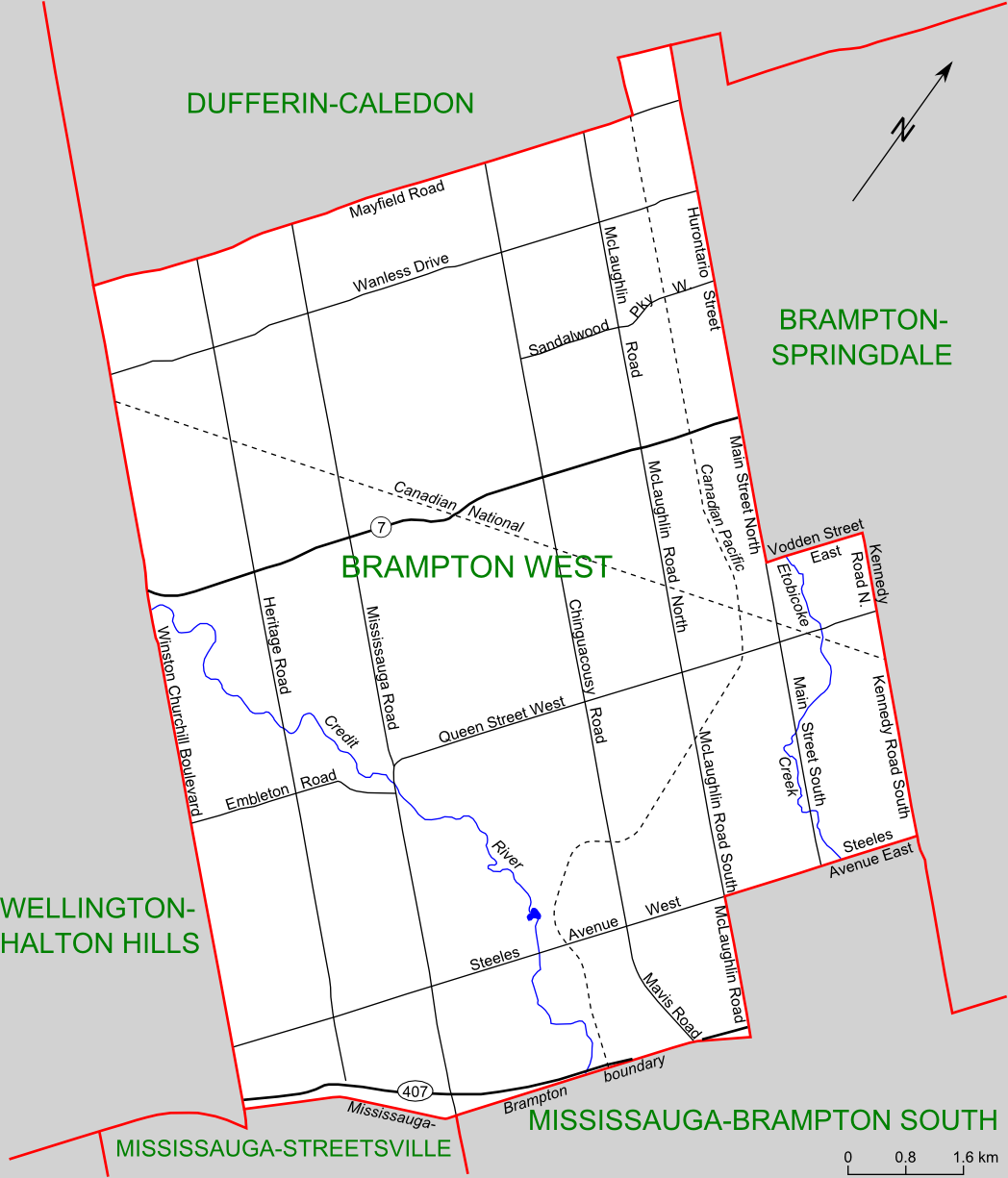
Map of Brampton West (2003 boundaries)

Brampton West (French: Brampton-Ouest) is a federal electoral district in Ontario, Canada, that has been represented in the House of Commons of Canada since 2004. Its population was 170,422 in 2006, being at the time the most populous riding in Canada.

The district includes the western part of the city of Brampton excluding the neighbourhood of Madoc.

The electoral district was created in 2003: 72.8% of the population of the riding came from Brampton West—Mississauga, and 27.2% from Brampton Centre. As a result of the 2012 electoral redistribution, this riding lost just over half of its territory, mostly to Brampton South, with portions going to Brampton North.

People of Jamaican ethnic origin make up 13.0% of the riding's population, the highest such percentage in Canada.

== Demographics ==
According to the 2021 Canadian census

Languages: 41.8% English, 20.3% Punjabi, 4.4% Urdu, 3.8% Hindi, 3.4% Gujarati, 2.4% Tamil, 1.6% Tagalog, 1.5% Portuguese, 1.1% Spanish

Religions: 34.2% Christian (16.3% Catholic, 3.2% Pentecostal, 14.7% Other), 24.4% Sikh, 20.4% Hindu, 10.6% Muslim, 1.1% Buddhist, 8.8% None

Median income: $37,600 (2020)

Average income: $46,640 (2020)

Panethnic groups in Brampton West (2011−2021)
Panethnic group	2021		2016		2011	
Panethnic group	Pop.	%	Pop.	%	Pop.	%
South Asian	90,595	55.97%	56,145	43.38%	34,085	33.46%
African	26,035	16.08%	24,405	18.86%	21,165	20.77%
European (Note: Statistic includes all persons that did not make up part of a visible minority or an indigenous identity.)	21,110	13.04%	26,770	20.68%	28,905	28.37%
Southeast Asian (Note: Statistic includes total responses of "Filipino" and "Southeast Asian" under visible minority section on census.)	7,670	4.74%	7,690	5.94%	7,055	6.92%
Middle Eastern (Note: Statistic includes total responses of "West Asian" and "Arab" under visible minority section on census.)	3,025	1.87%	2,145	1.66%	1,255	1.23%
Latin American	2,615	1.62%	2,715	2.1%	2,205	2.16%
East Asian (Note: Statistic includes total responses of "Chinese", "Korean", and "Japanese" under visible minority section on census.)	1,925	1.19%	2,365	1.83%	1,580	1.55%
Indigenous	605	0.37%	740	0.57%	415	0.41%
Other/multiracial (Note: Statistic includes total responses of "Visible minority, n.i.e." and "Multiple visible minorities" under visible minority section on census.)	8,280	5.12%	6,460	4.99%	5,230	5.13%
Total responses	161,860	99.7%	129,420	99.55%	101,880 (Note: Greater than total population due to total population revision.)	100.12%
Total population	162,353	100%	130,000	100%	101,757	100%
Notes: Totals greater than 100% due to multiple origin responses. Demographics based on 2012 Canadian federal electoral redistribution riding boundaries.

== Member of Parliament ==
The riding has elected the following members of Parliament:

Parliament	Years	Member	Party
Brampton West; Riding created from Brampton West—Mississauga and Brampton Centre
38th	2004–2006	Colleen Beaumier	Liberal
39th	2006–2008	Colleen Beaumier	Liberal
40th	2008–2011	Andrew Kania	Liberal
41st	2011–2015	Kyle Seeback	Conservative
42nd	2015–2019	Kamal Khera	Liberal
43rd	2019–2021	Kamal Khera	Liberal
44th	2021–2025	Kamal Khera	Liberal
45th	2025–present	Amarjeet Gill	Conservative

== Election results ==
=== 2025 ===
2025 Canadian federal election
Party	Candidate	Votes	%	±%	Expenditures
Conservative	Amarjeet Gill	21,112	49.8	+22.06	
Liberal	Kamal Khera	20,194	47.6	–8.62	
New Democratic	Zaigham Javed	708	1.7	–11.09	
Green	Sameera Khan	278	0.7	N/A	
Centrist	Khawaja Amir Hassan	95	0.2	N/A	
Total valid votes/expense limit		42,387	98.95	-0.25	
Total rejected ballots		448	1.05	+0.25	
Turnout		42,835	65.41	+11.11	
Eligible voters		65,486			
Conservative gain from Liberal		Swing		+15.34	
Source: Elections Canada

=== 2021 ===
2021 federal election redistributed results
Party	Vote	%
Liberal	17,524	56.29
Conservative	8,632	27.73
New Democratic	3,973	12.76
People's	770	2.47
Others	230	0.74

2021 Canadian federal election: Brampton West
Party	Candidate	Votes	%	±%	Expenditures
Liberal	Kamal Khera	25,780	55.3	+1.8	$107,717.96
Conservative	Jermaine Chambers	13,186	28.3	+4.4	$33,421.74
New Democratic	Gurprit Gill	6,097	13.1	-5.3	$0.00
People's	Rahul Samuel Zia	1,218	2.6	+1.7	$0.00
Independent	Sivakumar Ramasamy	328	0.7	N/A	$0.00
Total valid votes/expense limit		46,609	99.2	–	$115,623.57
Total rejected ballots		390	0.8		
Turnout		46,999	54.3		
Eligible voters		86,557			
Liberal hold		Swing		-1.3	
Source: Elections Canada

=== 2019 ===
2019 Canadian federal election: Brampton West
Party	Candidate	Votes	%	±%	Expenditures
Liberal	Kamal Khera	28,743	53.5	-2.39	$109,585.64
Conservative	Murarilal Thapliyal	12,824	23.9	-6.21	$110,270.48
New Democratic	Navjit Kaur	9,855	18.4	+5.96	$74,444.87
Green	Jane Davidson	1,271	2.4	+0.85	$683.08
People's	Roger Sampson	505	0.9		$3,955.00
Christian Heritage	Paul Tannahill	319	0.6		none listed
Communist	Harinderpal Hundal	97	0.2		$476.56
Canada's Fourth Front	Anjum Malik	69	0.1		$0.00
Total valid votes/expense limit		53,683	100.0		
Total rejected ballots		735			
Turnout		54,418	62.6		
Eligible voters		86,912			
Liberal hold		Swing		+1.91	
Source: Elections Canada

=== 2015 ===
2015 Canadian federal election: Brampton West
Party	Candidate	Votes	%	±%	Expenditures
Liberal	Kamal Khera	24,256	55.89	+19.81	$186,667.41
Conservative	Ninder Thind	13,068	30.11	-11.90	$179,464.92
New Democratic	Adaoma Patterson	5,400	12.44	-7.18	$29,137.39
Green	Karthika Gobinath	674	1.55	-0.02	$702.19
Total valid votes/expense limit		43,398	100.00		$203,918.62
Total rejected ballots		245	0.56	–	
Turnout		43,643	61.70	–	
Eligible voters		70,734			
Liberal gain from Conservative		Swing		+15.86	
Source: Elections Canada

2011 federal election redistributed results
Party	Vote	%
Conservative	11,977	42.02
Liberal	10,285	36.08
New Democratic	5,594	19.62
Green	449	1.58
Others	201	0.71

=== 2011 ===
2011 Canadian federal election: Brampton West
Party	Candidate	Votes	%	±%	Expenditures
Conservative	Kyle Seeback	28,320	44.75	+4.9	
Liberal	Andrew Kania	22,128	34.97	-5.3	
New Democratic	Jagtar Shergill	11,225	17.74	+4.1	
Green	Avtaar Soor	1,224	1.93	-4.3	
Independent	Theodore Koum Njoh	387	0.61	–	
Total valid votes		63,284	100%		
Total rejected ballots		400	0.63	–	
Turnout		63,684	55.12	–	
Eligible voters		115,545	–		
Conservative gain from Liberal		Swing		+5.1	

=== 2008 ===
2008 Canadian federal election: Brampton West
Party	Candidate	Votes	%	±%	Expenditures
Liberal	Andrew Kania	21,746	40.3	-8.8	$101,467
Conservative	Kyle Seeback	21,515	39.9	+4.2	$103,283
New Democratic	Jagtar Shergill	7,334	13.6	+2.5	$21,521
Green	Patti Chemelyk	3,329	6.2	+2.1	$92
Total valid votes/expense limit		53,924	100.0	$103,318	
Total rejected ballots		347	0.6		
Turnout		54,271			
Liberal hold		Swing		-6.5	

Note: As certified on 5 November 2008 after a recount.

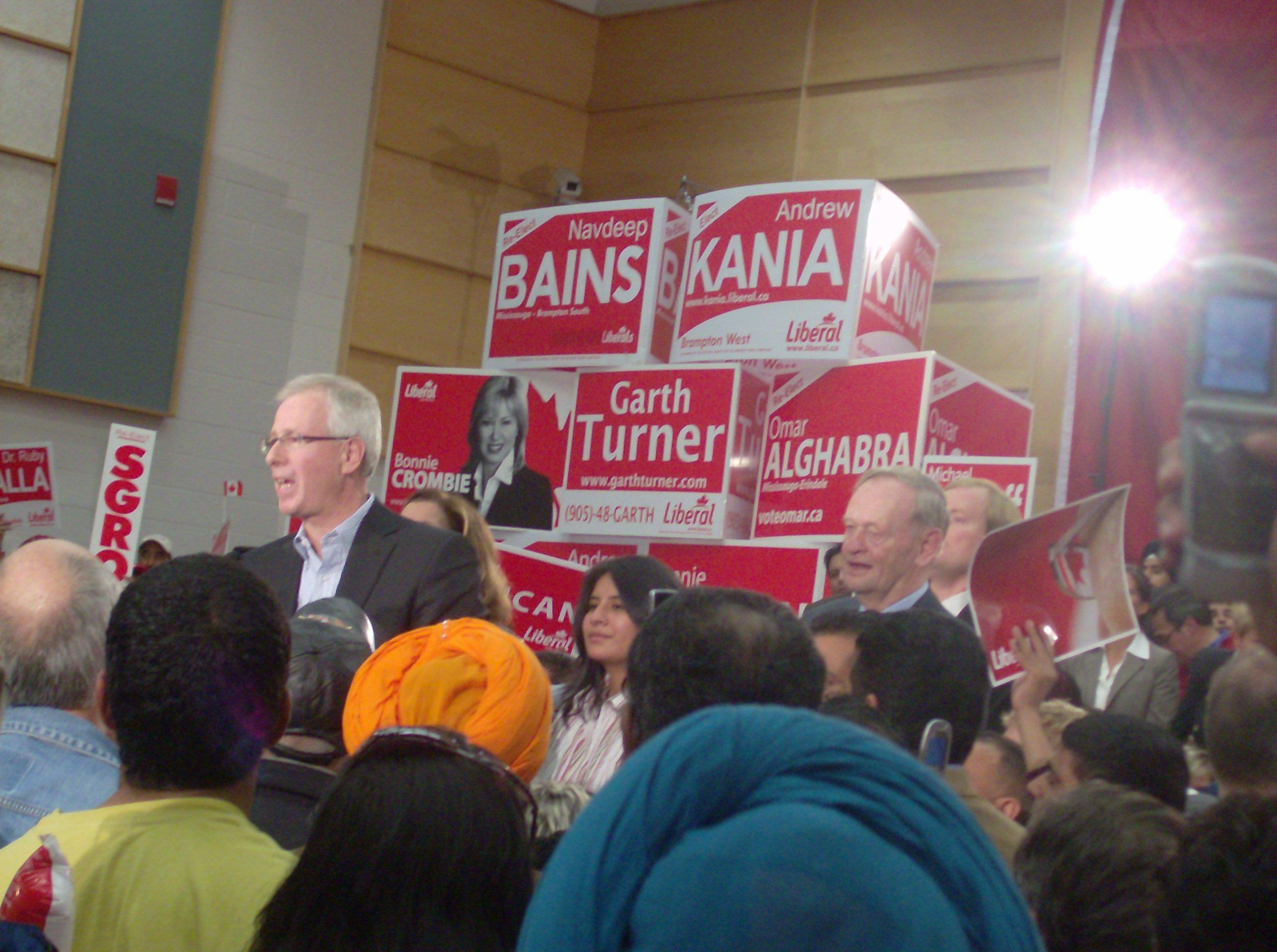
Stéphane Dion makes a speech on October 10, 2008 in Brampton West. Former Prime Minister Jean Chrétien was among notable Liberals at this rally; this was his first time campaigning for anyone, since retirement.

The 2008 federal election in this riding featured candidates from the four main national parties. The Greens' Patti Chemelyk is an administrator in the health care industry; Jagtar Shergill of the NDP was a registered insurance broker who had run for the party in 2006 and for Brampton City Council the same year; Conservative Kyle Seeback is a commercial litigation lawyer and former national-level swimmer; and winner Andrew Kania, a Liberal, practiced family law.

Seeback was nominated by the Conservatives in April 2008.

Liberal incumbent Colleen Beaumier announced her retirement from the politics. This left the riding without an incumbent, and the Brampton West Federal Liberal Riding Association without a candidate to run. The hopefuls for the Liberal nomination were Dipika Damerla, Raj Jhajj, and Andrew Kania. Jhajj was the riding president, but stepped down from the position, to be considered. Kania had previously sought the party's nomination in Brampton—Springdale, but then-Prime Minister Paul Martin placed Dr. Ruby Dhalla as the candidate. On September 12, the riding association gathered at the Marriott Courtyard Convention Centre, where Kania's selection was announced.

Kania won by a small margin, with the election being one of the last to be called, with Kania not taking the lead until midnight; the election was so tight, The Toronto Star declared Seeback the winner in a published article, latter retracted. The Conservatives won nationally, with the Liberals losing around 20 seats. Kania commented, "I am very thankful to the people of Brampton West for trusting me to represent them in circumstances where the Liberal Party lost about 20 seats. Nobody will work harder, or care more. They will not be disappointed and much good will come from this win." Seeback commented that, "I said it was going to be under a thousand votes; I didn't expect it to be this close, though."

On October 23, 2008, Elections Canada announced that a judicial recount had been granted in Brampton West, under an Ontario Superior Court judge. It is the fifth recount ordered, post-election.

=== 2006 ===
2006 Canadian federal election: Brampton West
Party	Candidate	Votes	%	±%
Liberal	Colleen Beaumier	27,988	49.1	+4.7
Conservative	Bal Gosal	20,345	35.7	-4.3
New Democratic	Jagtar Singh Shergill	6,310	11.1	+0.6
Green	Jaipaul Massey-Singh	2,340	4.1	+0.7
Total valid votes		56,983	100.0	

=== 2004 ===
2004 Canadian federal election: Brampton West
Party	Candidate	Votes	%
Liberal	Colleen Beaumier	21,254	45.4
Conservative	Tony Clement	18,768	40.0
New Democratic	Chris Moise	4,920	10.5
Green	Sanjeev Goel	1,603	3.4
Independent	Tom Bose	371	0.8
Total valid votes		46,916	100.0

== See also ==
- List of Canadian electoral districts
- Historical federal electoral districts of Canada
