= Sonia Sidhu =

Canadian politician

Sonia Sidhu MP
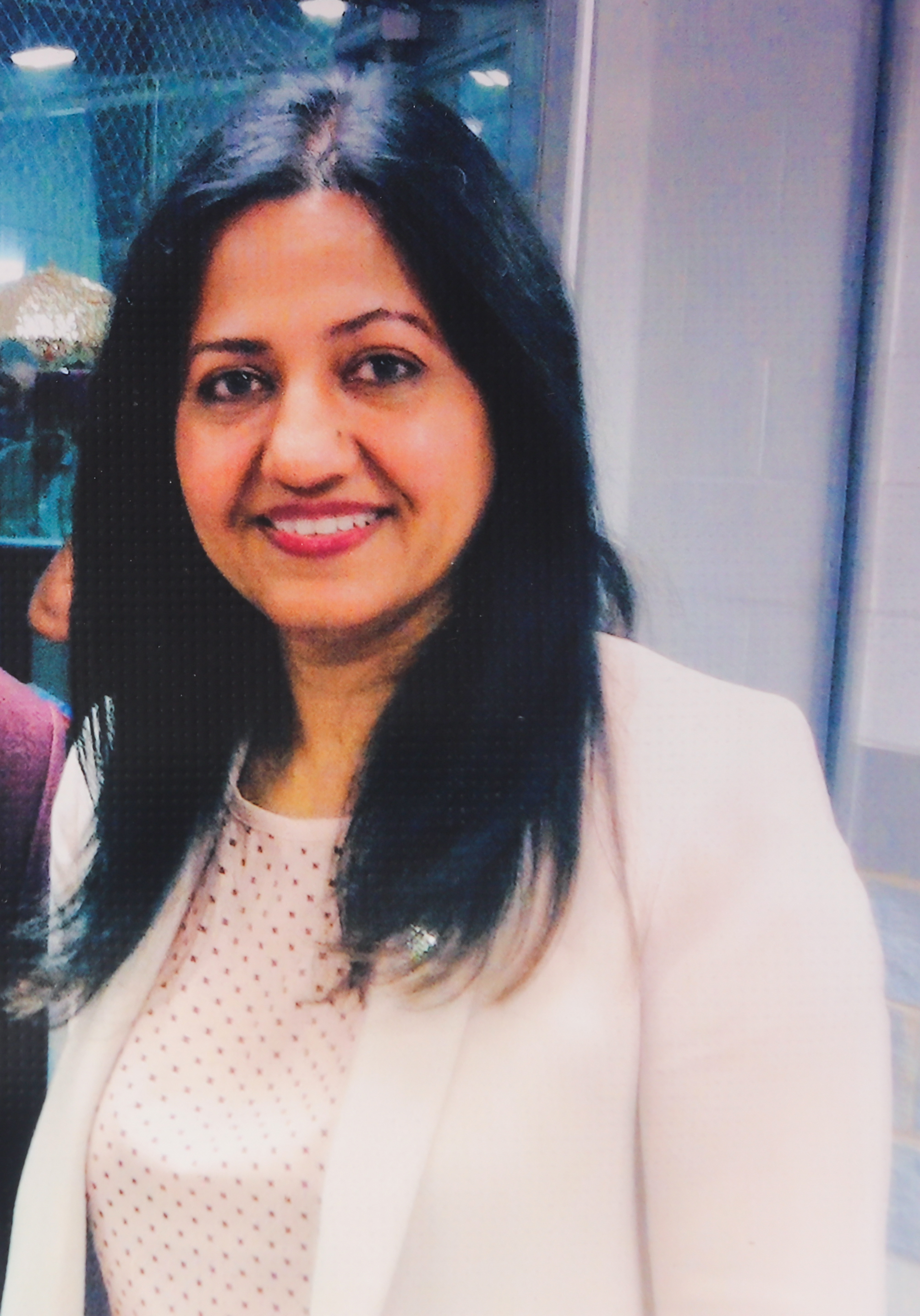

Member of Parliament for Brampton South
- Incumbent
- Assumed office October 19, 2015
- Preceded by: New district

Personal details
- Born: January 3, 1968 (age 58) India
- Party: Liberal
- Spouse: Gurjit
- Website: ssidhu.liberal.ca

Satinderpal "Sonia" Sidhu MP (January 3, 1968) is a Canadian politician who was elected as a Member of Parliament in the House of Commons of Canada to represent the federal electoral district of Brampton South during the 2015 Canadian federal election.

== Early life ==
Born in India, Sidhu arrived in Canada in 1992.

== Political career ==
Sonia Sidhu is the Member of Parliament for Brampton South. She was elected on October 19, 2015 as the Liberal candidate. Before politics, she worked for over 18 years in the healthcare field.

In Parliament, she sits on the House of Commons’ Standing Committee on Health, and also was appointed to sit as a member of the Special Committee on Pay Equity. She is Vice-Chair of the Standing Committee on the Status of Women as well as the Chair and the Liberal caucus champion for the All-Party Diabetes Caucus. MP Sidhu is also the General-Secretary of the Canada-India Parliamentary Friendship Group and an executive member of both the Canada-Poland and Canada-Portugal Parliamentary Friendship Groups. She further sits as a member of the Canada-Europe Parliamentary Association, the Canada-U.S. Inter-Parliamentary Group, and the Commonwealth Parliamentary Association.

During the 43rd Canadian Parliament Sidhu's private member bill An Act to establish a national framework for diabetes (Bill C-237) was adopted to require the Minister of Health, within one year, to develop a framework to improve access to information on diabetes prevention and treatment. The framework was tabled in the House of Commons on October 5, 2022 which outlines a common policy direction for diabetes across the country.

Sidhu was one of five Ontario Liberal MPs to call on the federal government to work with provinces and territories to establish and implement enforceable national standards for long-term care homes in Canada. The 2020 Speech from the Throne committed the Government of Canada to work with the provinces and territories to set new, national standards for LTC so that seniors get the best support possible.

During the 44th Canadian Parliament, Sidhu put a motion on notice in the House of Commons (M-82) pertaining to active living in Canada. She also made a call to action calling on all MPs to end the practice of gender-based heckling in the House of Commons.

Throughout her time in office, Sidhu has been vocal around women's rights, health care outcomes, and affordable housing, always supporting and voting in favor of progressive legislation aimed at advancing these issues. She spoke against Bill C-311, put forward by the Conservative Member from Yorkton—Melville, which she said was a thinly veiled attempt to reopen Canada's abortion debate.

== Personal life ==
She lives in her riding of Brampton South with her husband, Gurjit. She has twin daughters and a son.

== Electoral record ==
2025 Canadian federal election: Brampton South
Party	Candidate	Votes	%	±%	Expenditures
Liberal	Sonia Sidhu	22,001	49.33	–4.55	
Conservative	Sukhdeep Kang	21,193	47.52	+18.06	
New Democratic	Rajni Sharma	777	1.74	–11.79	
People's	Vijay Kumar	358	0.80	–2.07	
Independent	Manmohan Khroud	274	0.61	N/A	
Total valid votes/expense limit		44,603	99.07	+0.27	
Total rejected ballots		418	0.93	-0.27	
Turnout		45,021	66.25	+11.08	
Eligible voters		67,956			
Liberal hold		Swing		–11.31	
Source: Elections Canada

2021 Canadian federal election: Brampton South
Party	Candidate	Votes	%	±%	Expenditures
Liberal	Sonia Sidhu	21,120	50.98	+1.51	$97,785.16
Conservative	Ramandeep Brar	12,596	30.40	+2.00	$75,417.63
New Democratic	Tejinder Singh	5,894	14.23	-2.17	$13,391.87
People's	Nicholas Craniotis	1,820	4.39	3.67	$2,380.47
Total valid votes/expense limit		41,439	–	–	$109,088.26
Total rejected ballots		503	1.20		
Turnout		41,933	55.17	-7.59	
Eligible voters		76,003			
Source: Elections Canada

2019 Canadian federal election: Brampton South
Party	Candidate	Votes	%	±%	Expenditures
Liberal	Sonia Sidhu	24,085	49.47	-2.62	$92,936.55
Conservative	Ramandeep Brar	13,828	28.40	-6.64	$98,182.77
New Democratic	Mandeep Kaur	7,985	16.40	+5.75	$53,224.68
Green	Karen Fraser	1,926	3.95	+1.73	none listed
People's	Rajwinder Ghuman	354	0.72		none listed
Christian Heritage	Wavey Mercer	285	0.58		none listed
Canada's Fourth Front	Mitesh Joshi	152	0.31		$8,217.30
Marxist–Leninist	Dagmar Sullivan	68	0.13		$20.00
Total valid votes/expense limit		48,863	100.0		
Total rejected ballots		583			
Turnout		49,266	62.76		
Eligible voters		78,487			
Liberal hold		Swing		+2.01	
Source: Elections Canada

2015 Canadian federal election
Party	Candidate	Votes	%	±%	Expenditures
Liberal	Sonia Sidhu	23,681	52.1	–	–
Conservative	Kyle Seeback	15,929	35.0	–	–
New Democratic	Amarjit Sangha	4,843	10.7	–	–
Green	Shaun Hatton	1,011	2.2	–	–
Total valid votes/Expense limit		45,464	100.0		$203,710.69
Total rejected ballots		270	–	–	
Turnout		45,734	–	–	
Eligible voters		72,111			
Source: Elections Canada
