= Fernand Picard (politician) =

Canadian politician

Member of the Legislative Assembly of Quebec for Olier
- In office 1966–1973
- Preceded by: District created
- Succeeded by: District abolished

Member of the National Assembly of Quebec for Viau
- In office 1973–1976
- Preceded by: District created
- Succeeded by: Charles-A. Lefebvre

Personal details
- Born: April 3, 1917 Montreal, Quebec
- Died: October 1, 1986 (aged 69) Montreal, Quebec
- Party: Liberal

Fernand Picard (April 3, 1917 – October 1, 1986) was a Canadian politician.

Born in Montreal, Quebec, Picard was elected to the Legislative Assembly of Quebec in 1966 for Olier. A Liberal, he was re-elected in 1970 and in 1973 in the riding of Viau. He did not run in 1976.

He died in Montreal in 1986.
