= Kyle Seeback =

Canadian politician and lawyer

Kyle Seeback MP
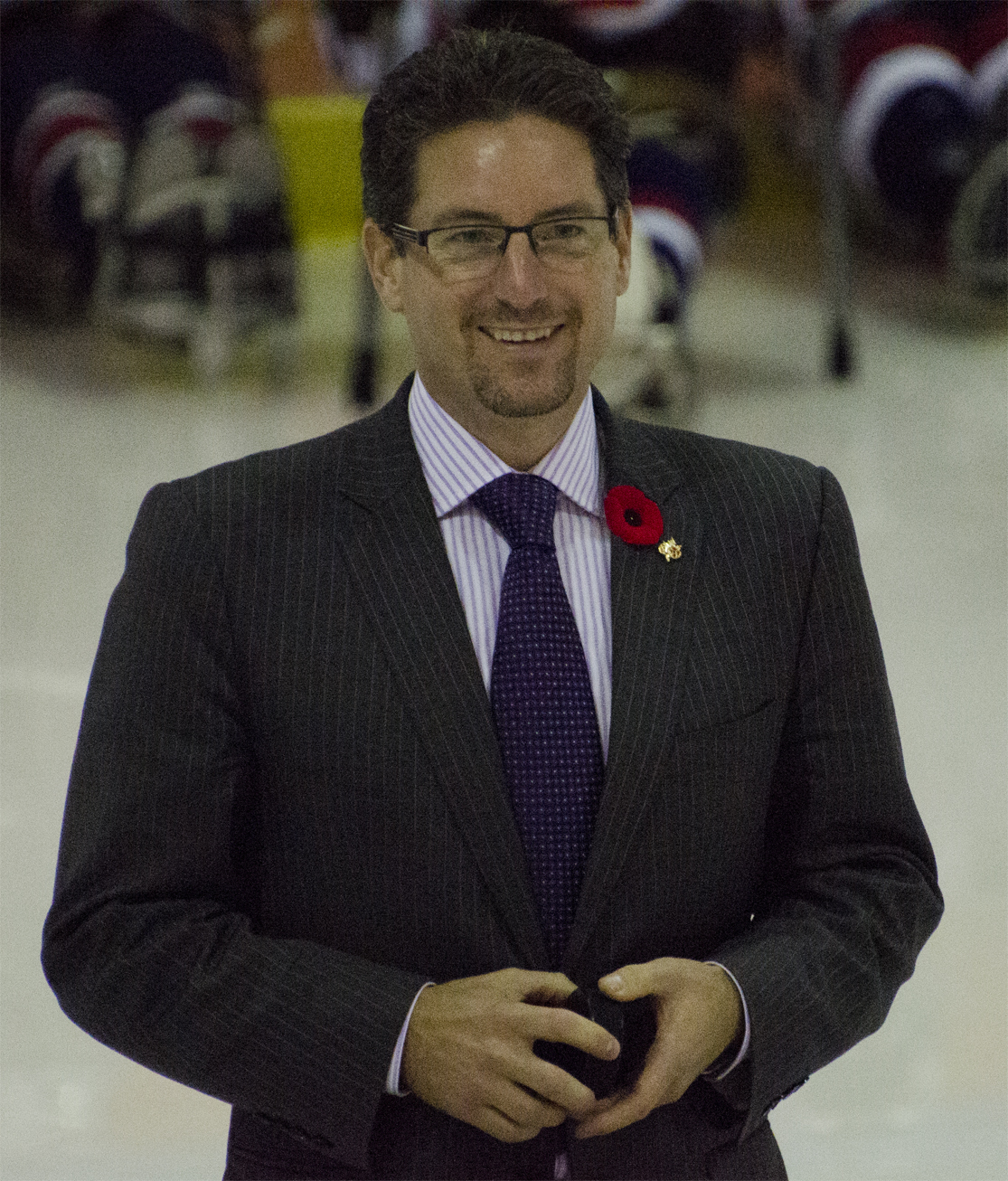
- Seeback in November 2014

Member of Parliament for Dufferin—Caledon
- Incumbent
- Assumed office October 21, 2019
- Preceded by: David Tilson

Member of Parliament for Brampton West
- In office May 2, 2011 – August 4, 2015
- Preceded by: Andrew Kania
- Succeeded by: Kamal Khera
Shadow Minister
2025–present	Labour
2022–2025	International Trade

Personal details
- Born: August 19, 1970 (age 55) Brampton, Ontario, Canada
- Party: Conservative
- Profession: Politician; Lawyer

Kyle Seeback MP (born August 19, 1970) is a Canadian politician and lawyer who was elected as the Member of Parliament (MP) for Dufferin—Caledon in the 2019 election. He also represented the riding of Brampton West from 2011 to 2015. He was defeated by Sonia Sidhu in the riding of Brampton South during the 2015 Canadian federal election. He is a member of the Conservative Party of Canada.

In 2023, during the 44th Canadian Parliament, Seeback's private member bill: Bill C-242 An Act to amend the Immigration and Refugee Protection Act (temporary resident visas for parents and grandparents), was adopted to increase the length of time, from 2 years to 5 years, that a foreign person can be authorized to be a temporary resident for the purposes of visiting a Canadian citizen or permanent resident who is their child or grandchild, as well as enabling an insurance company outside Canada to qualify as providing that person's necessary health insurance coverage.

Prior to entering federal politics, Seeback was an employee at Simmons Da Silva & Sinton LLP.

Seeback and his family moved to Amaranth, Ontario in 2009. He has resided in Orangeville, Ontario since 2017.

== Controversies ==
On December 3, 2013, Seeback is reported to have called his Conservative colleague Brad Butt a "bitch" during an exchange in the House of Commons. Seeback apologized for his "unparliamentary language" the following day.

== Electoral record ==
2025 Canadian federal election: Dufferin—Caledon
Party	Candidate	Votes	%	±%	Expenditures
Conservative	Kyle Seeback	42,458	60.1	+11.0	
Liberal	Malalai Halimi	24,818	35.2	+6.6	
New Democratic	Viktor Karklins	1,380	2.0	–8.4	
Green	Ifra Baig	927	1.3	–3.2	
People's	Dympna Carolan	752	1.1	–6	
Independent	Jeffrey Halsall	260	0.4	N/A	
Total valid votes/expense limit		70,595	99.6	+0.2	
Total rejected ballots		318	0.4	-0.2	
Turnout		70,913	71.5	+10.7	
Eligible voters		99,251			
Conservative hold		Swing			
Source: Elections Canada

2021 Canadian federal election: Dufferin—Caledon
Party	Candidate	Votes	%	±%	Expenditures
Conservative	Kyle Seeback	31,490	48.0	+6.0	$114,758.32
Liberal	Lisa Post	19,867	30.3	-2.7	$46,734.31
New Democratic	Samantha Sanchez	6,866	10.5	-1.1	$250.74
People's	Anthony Zambito	4,389	6.7	+4.5	none listed
Green	Jenni Michelle Le Forestier	2,754	4.2	-6.4	$30,773.52
Independent	Stephen McKendrick	207	0.3	–	$1,450.00
Total valid votes		65,573	99.4		
Total rejected ballots		398	0.6		
Turnout		65,971	60.83		
Eligible voters		108,445			
Source: Elections Canada

2019 Canadian federal election: Dufferin—Caledon
Party	Candidate	Votes	%	±%	Expenditures
Conservative	Kyle Seeback	28,852	42.0	-4.28	$120,879.34
Liberal	Michele Fisher	22,645	33.0	-6.11	$47,017.22
New Democratic	Allison Brown	7,981	11.6	+4.32	$2,935.40
Green	Stefan Wiesen	7,303	10.6	+3.27	$35,743.85
People's	Chad Ransom	1,516	2.2	–	$14,281.99
Christian Heritage	Russ Emo	319	0.5	–	$1,435.59
Total valid votes/expense limit		68,616	100.0		
Total rejected ballots		447			
Turnout		69,063	65.1		
Eligible voters		106,138			
Conservative hold		Swing		+0.92	
Source: Elections Canada

2015 Canadian federal election: Brampton South
Party	Candidate	Votes	%	±%	Expenditures
Liberal	Sonia Sidhu	23,681	52.09	+16.70	$101,341.55
Conservative	Kyle Seeback	15,929	35.04	-10.37	$105,913.36
New Democratic	Amarjit Sangha	4,843	10.65	-5.77	$37,089.45
Green	Shaun Hatton	1,011	2.22	-0.04	$144.64
Total valid votes/expense limit		45,464	100.00		$205,155.00
Total rejected ballots		270	0.59	–	
Turnout		45,734	63.42	–	
Eligible voters		72,111			
Liberal gain from Conservative		Swing		+13.53	
Source: Elections Canada

2011 Canadian federal election: Brampton West
Party	Candidate	Votes	%	±%	Expenditures
Conservative	Kyle Seeback	28,320	44.75	+4.9	
Liberal	Andrew Kania	22,128	34.97	-5.3	
New Democratic	Jagtar Shergill	11,225	17.74	+4.1	
Green	Avtaar Soor	1,224	1.93	-4.3	
Independent	Theodore Koum Njoh	387	0.61	–	
Total valid votes		63,284	100%		
Total rejected ballots		400	0.63	–	
Turnout		63,684	55.12	–	
Eligible voters		115,545	–		
Conservative gain from Liberal		Swing		+5.1	

2008 Canadian federal election: Brampton West
Party	Candidate	Votes	%	±%	Expenditures
Liberal	Andrew Kania	21,746	40.3	-8.8	$101,467
Conservative	Kyle Seeback	21,515	39.9	+4.2	$103,283
New Democratic	Jagtar Shergill	7,334	13.6	+2.5	$21,521
Green	Patti Chemelyk	3,329	6.2	+2.1	$92
Total valid votes/expense limit		53,924	100.0	$103,318	
Total rejected ballots		347	0.6		
Turnout		54,271			
Liberal hold		Swing		-6.5	

Note: As certified on 5 November 2008 after a recount.
