= Kamal Khera =

Canadian politician (born 1989)

The Honourable Kamal Khera PC
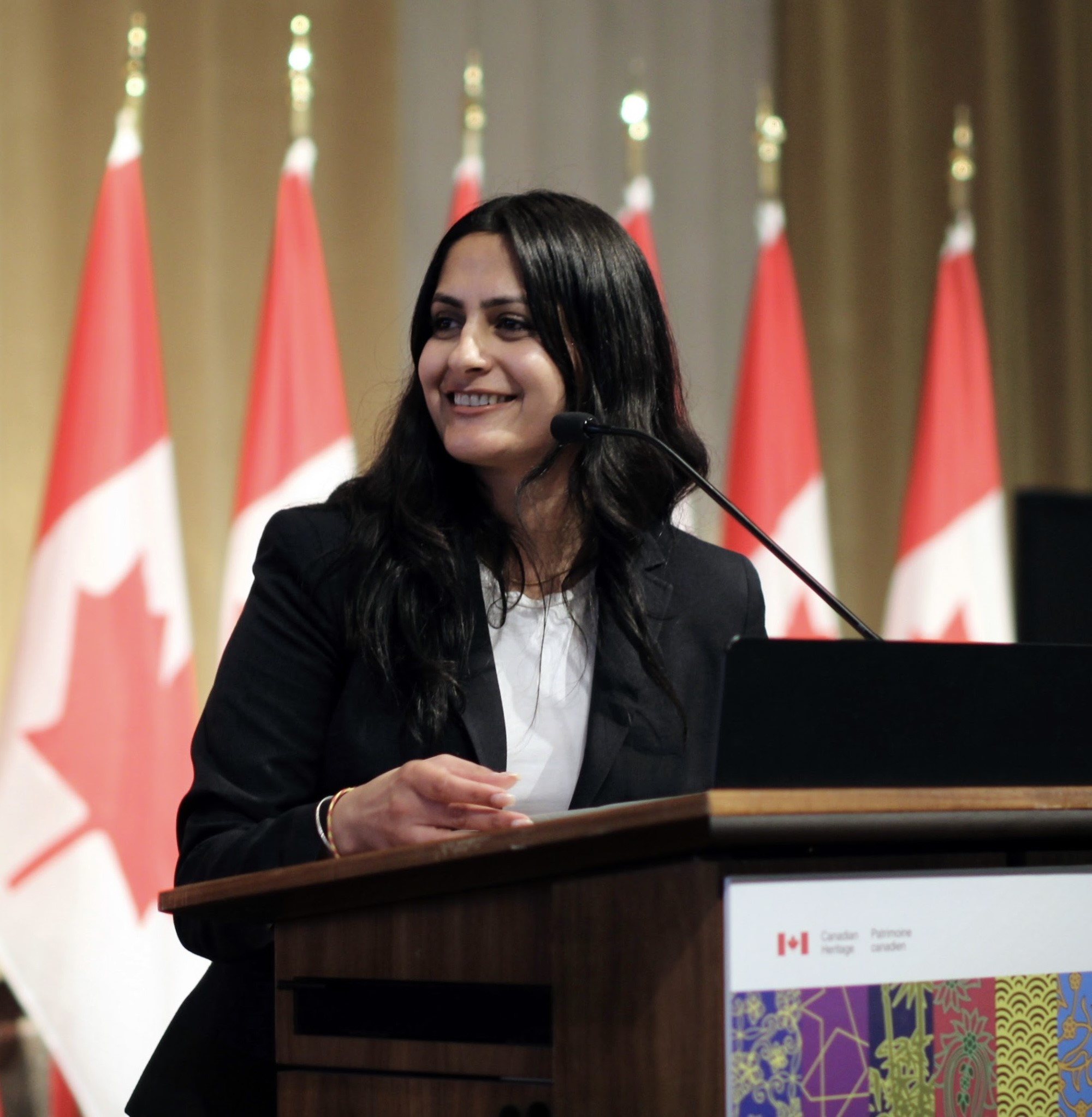
- Khera in 2024

Consul General of Canada to Los Angeles
- Incumbent
- Assumed office September 8, 2026
- Prime Minister: Mark Carney
- Preceded by: Sylvie Bédard

Minister of Health
- In office March 14, 2025 – May 13, 2025
- Prime Minister: Mark Carney
- Preceded by: Mark Holland
- Succeeded by: Marjorie Michel

Minister of Diversity, Inclusion and Persons with Disabilities
- In office July 26, 2023 – March 14, 2025
- Prime Minister: Justin Trudeau
- Preceded by: Ahmed Hussen
- Succeeded by: Position abolished

Minister of Seniors
- In office October 26, 2021 – July 26, 2023
- Prime Minister: Justin Trudeau
- Preceded by: Deb Schulte
- Succeeded by: Seamus O'Regan

Parliamentary Secretary to the Minister of International Development
- In office August 31, 2018 – January 31, 2021
- Minister: Karina Gould
- Preceded by: Celina Caesar-Chavannes
- Succeeded by: Maninder Sidhu

Parliamentary Secretary to the Minister of National Revenue
- In office January 30, 2017 – August 31, 2018
- Minister: Diane Lebouthillier
- Preceded by: Emmanuel Dubourg
- Succeeded by: Deb Schulte

Parliamentary Secretary to the Minister of Health
- In office December 2, 2015 – January 27, 2017
- Minister: Jane Philpott
- Preceded by: Cathy McLeod
- Succeeded by: Darren Fisher

Member of Parliament for Brampton West
- In office October 19, 2015 – April 28, 2025
- Preceded by: Kyle Seeback
- Succeeded by: Amarjeet Gill

Personal details
- Born: Delhi, India
- Party: Liberal
- Spouse: Jaspreet Dhillon
- Education: York University (BSN)
- Occupation: Registered nurse; politician

Kamal Khera is a Canadian nurse and politician who served as a Cabinet Minister under both Prime Minister Justin Trudeau and Prime Minister Mark Carney. A member of the Liberal Party, Khera represented the riding of Brampton West in the House of Commons from 2015 to 2025. She served as Minister of Seniors from 2021 to 2023, Minister of Diversity, Inclusion, and Persons with Disabilities from 2023 to 2025, and Minister of Health in 2025 until she was unseated in the 2025 Canadian federal election. Khera is among the youngest women ever elected to the House of Commons.

On July 14, 2026, Khera was appointed Consul General of Canada in Los Angeles.

== Education and early career ==
Before entering politics, Khera attended York University where she earned an Honours Bachelor of Science in nursing. She went on to work as a registered nurse in the palliative and oncology units at St. Joseph’s Health Centre in Toronto.

During the first wave of the COVID-19 pandemic, she volunteered at a long-term care facility in her hometown of Brampton and administered vaccines in the community.

== Federal politics ==
Khera was nominated as the Liberal candidate for Brampton West in December 2014 and was elected in the October 2015 federal election. When first elected in 2015, Khera was the youngest Liberal MP in the House, and the second-youngest overall behind Pierre-Luc Dusseault of the New Democratic Party (NDP). She was re-elected in the 2019 and 2021 federal elections.

=== Parliamentary Secretary ===
On December 2, 2015, Prime Minister Justin Trudeau appointed Khera as the parliamentary secretary to the minister of health, then as the parliamentary secretary to the minister of national revenue on January 18, 2017. Beginning August 31, 2018, Khera served as the parliamentary secretary to the minister of international development.

Khera stepped down from her role as parliamentary secretary on January 3, 2021, after having travelled to the United States in December to attend a memorial service for her uncle, despite the federal government's advisories against international travel during the COVID-19 pandemic.

=== Minister of Seniors ===
On October 26, 2021, Khera was appointed minister of seniors.

Her tenure was marked by the government’s restoration of the age of eligibility for retirement benefits to 65, an increase of the Guaranteed Income Supplement (GIS), which has helped over 900,000 seniors, and has lifted 45,000 of them out of poverty, the enhancement of the Canada Pension Plan (CPP), and a 10 per cent increase of Old Age Security (OAS) pensions for seniors over 75.

=== Minister of Diversity, Inclusion, and Persons with Disabilities ===
On July 26, 2023, Khera was appointed minister of diversity, inclusion, and persons with disabilities as part of a summer cabinet shuffle. She succeeded Ahmed Hussen, who was minister of housing and diversity and inclusion, and Carla Qualthrough, who was minister of persons with disabilities.

On June 8, 2024, Khera announced the launch of the federal government's new Anti-Racism Strategy, a $110.4 million investment aimed at driving action in employment, justice and law enforcement, housing, healthcare and immigration systems.

Khera also rolled out the Canadian Disability Benefit in the 2024 Canadian federal budget, a $6.1 billion investment intended to improve the financial security of more than 600,000 low-income working-age people with disabilities.

=== Minister of Health ===
In March 2025, Khera was appointed minister of health in Prime Minister Mark Carney's cabinet.

=== 2025 election ===
On April 28, 2025, Khera lost her seat in the federal election to Conservative challenger Amarjeet Gill. She was the only sitting cabinet minister to be defeated. Her loss in Brampton West was considered one of the biggest surprises of the election, as she had topped the list of Liberal voter identifications nationwide.

== Electoral record ==
2025 Canadian federal election: Brampton West
Party	Candidate	Votes	%	±%	Expenditures
Conservative	Amarjeet Gill	21,112	49.8	+22.06	
Liberal	Kamal Khera	20,194	47.6	–8.62	
New Democratic	Zaigham Javed	708	1.7	–11.09	
Green	Sameera Khan	278	0.7	N/A	
Centrist	Khawaja Amir Hassan	95	0.2	N/A	
Total valid votes/expense limit		42,387	98.95	-0.25	
Total rejected ballots		448	1.05	+0.25	
Turnout		42,835	65.41	+11.11	
Eligible voters		65,486			
Conservative gain from Liberal		Swing		+15.34	
Source: Elections Canada

2021 Canadian federal election: Brampton West
Party	Candidate	Votes	%	±%	Expenditures
Liberal	Kamal Khera	25,780	55.3	+1.8	$107,717.96
Conservative	Jermaine Chambers	13,186	28.3	+4.4	$33,421.74
New Democratic	Gurprit Gill	6,097	13.1	-5.3	$0.00
People's	Rahul Samuel Zia	1,218	2.6	+1.7	$0.00
Independent	Sivakumar Ramasamy	328	0.7	N/A	$0.00
Total valid votes/expense limit		46,609	99.2	–	$115,623.57
Total rejected ballots		390	0.8		
Turnout		46,999	54.3		
Eligible voters		86,557			
Liberal hold		Swing		-1.3	
Source: Elections Canada

2019 Canadian federal election: Brampton West
Party	Candidate	Votes	%	±%	Expenditures
Liberal	Kamal Khera	28,743	53.5	-2.39	$109,585.64
Conservative	Murarilal Thapliyal	12,824	23.9	-6.21	$110,270.48
New Democratic	Navjit Kaur	9,855	18.4	+5.96	$74,444.87
Green	Jane Davidson	1,271	2.4	+0.85	$683.08
People's	Roger Sampson	505	0.9		$3,955.00
Christian Heritage	Paul Tannahill	319	0.6		none listed
Communist	Harinderpal Hundal	97	0.2		$476.56
Canada's Fourth Front	Anjum Malik	69	0.1		$0.00
Total valid votes/expense limit		53,683	100.0		
Total rejected ballots		735			
Turnout		54,418	62.6		
Eligible voters		86,912			
Liberal hold		Swing		+1.91	
Source: Elections Canada

2015 Canadian federal election: Brampton West
Party	Candidate	Votes	%	±%	Expenditures
Liberal	Kamal Khera	24,256	55.89	+19.81	$186,667.41
Conservative	Ninder Thind	13,068	30.11	-11.90	$179,464.92
New Democratic	Adaoma Patterson	5,400	12.44	-7.18	$29,137.39
Green	Karthika Gobinath	674	1.55	-0.02	$702.19
Total valid votes/expense limit		43,398	100.00		$203,918.62
Total rejected ballots		245	0.56	–	
Turnout		43,643	61.70	–	
Eligible voters		70,734			
Liberal gain from Conservative		Swing		+15.86	
Source: Elections Canada
