= Emmanuel Dubourg =

Canadian politician

Emmanuel Dubourg CPA
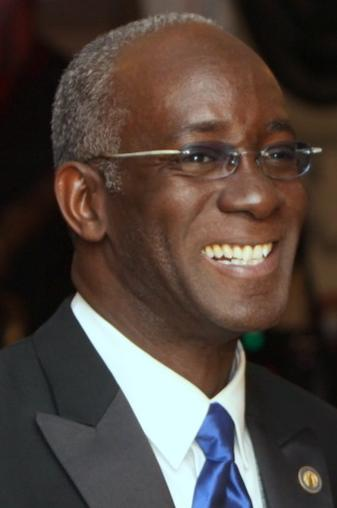

Parliamentary Secretary to the Minister of National Revenue
- In office 2 December 2015 – 27 January 2017
- Minister: Diane Lebouthillier
- Preceded by: Gerald Keddy
- Succeeded by: Kamal Khera

Member of Parliament for Bourassa
- In office 25 November 2013 – 23 March 2025
- Preceded by: Denis Coderre
- Succeeded by: Abdelhaq Sari

Member of the Quebec National Assembly for Viau
- In office 25 April 2007 – 9 August 2013
- Preceded by: William Cusano

Personal details
- Born: 26 December 1958 (age 67) Saint-Marc, Haiti
- Party: Liberal Party of Canada
- Other political affiliations: Quebec Liberal Party
- Education: Université du Québec à Montréal
- Profession: Chartered Accountant and teacher

Emmanuel Dubourg (born 26 December 1958) is a Canadian politician, chartered accountant and teacher from Quebec. He was the Member of National Assembly of Quebec for the riding of Viau from 2007 until 2013. On 25 November 2013, he was elected to the House of Commons of Canada in a by-election to become the Liberal Member of Parliament for the Montreal riding of Bourassa. He did not stand for re-election in 2025.

== Early life and education ==
Born in Saint-Marc, Haiti, he emigrated to Canada in 1974.

Dubourg obtained a Master of Business Administration at Université du Québec à Montréal and has been a member of the Ordre des comptables agréés du Québec since 1987.

== Career ==
Dubourg was a teacher at Université du Québec à Montréal, Université du Québec en Outaouais and CEGEP Montmorency. He has been honoured with several awards and citations for his work over the years, including the Governor General's Medal, the Innovation and Excellence prize from Revenue Canada in 1992 and the Black History Month Award in 2006 for his work in the black community.

== Political career ==
Dubourg won his seat in the 2007 Quebec Provincial Election, succeeding former Liberal MNA William Cusano. After the election, was named the Parliamentary Secretary to the Minister of Employment and Social Solidarity, a portfolio held by Sam Hamad. He was re-elected in the 2008 and 2012 general elections.

He resigned on 9 August 2013 to run for the Liberal Party of Canada's nomination in a by-election for the riding of Bourassa, triggered by incumbent Denis Coderre resigning to make an ultimately successful bid for mayor of Montreal. He was elected on 25 November 2013 with 47% of the votes. He served as the National Revenue Critic for the Liberals, but was not promoted to Cabinet when the Liberals won the 2015 election. He was, however, appointed as the Parliamentary Secretary to the Minister of National Revenue, serving from December 2015 to January 2017.

== Personal life ==
Dubourg was married to Papineau MP Marjorie Michel, his former political attaché and daughter of former Prime Minister of Haiti Smarck Michel.

== Electoral record ==
=== Federal results ===
2021 Canadian federal election: Bourassa
Party	Candidate	Votes	%	±%	Expenditures
Liberal	Emmanuel Dubourg	22,303	60.4	+2.8	
Bloc Québécois	Ardo Dia	6,907	18.7	-3.7	
New Democratic	Nicholas Ponari	2,956	8.0	+0.1	
Conservative	Ilyasa Sykes	2,587	7.0	-0.2	
People's	Michel Lavoie	1,349	3.7	+2.8	
Green	Nathe Perrone	679	1.8	-1.5	
Independent	Michel Prairie	151	0.4	N/A	
Total valid votes		36,932	97.1		
Total rejected ballots		1,086	2.9		
Turnout		38,018	56.6		
Registered voters		67,209			
Liberal hold		Swing		+3.3	
Source: Elections Canada

2019 Canadian federal election: Bourassa
Party	Candidate	Votes	%	±%	Expenditures
Liberal	Emmanuel Dubourg	23,231	57.6	+3.54	$42,025.88
Bloc Québécois	Anne-Marie Lavoie	9,043	22.4	+5.27	$2,855.91
New Democratic	Konrad Lamour	3,204	7.9	-7.04	$0.10
Conservative	Catherine Lefebvre	2,899	7.2	-2.09	none listed
Green	Payton Ashe	1,343	3.3	+1.15	$0.00
People's	Louis Léger	347	0.9	–	$3,418.25
Independent	Joseph Di Iorio	212	0.5	–	$3,793.99
Marxist–Leninist	Françoise Roy	72	0.2	–	$0.00
Total valid votes/expense limit		40,351	100.0		
Total rejected ballots		1,009			
Turnout		41,360	59.1		
Eligible voters		69,996			
Liberal hold		Swing		-0.87	
Source: Elections Canada

2015 Canadian federal election
Party	Candidate	Votes	%	±%	Expenditures
Liberal	Emmanuel Dubourg	22,234	54.1	+5.92	–
Bloc Québécois	Gilles Léveillé	7,049	17.1	+4.08	–
New Democratic	Dolmine Laguerre	6,144	14.9	-16.54	–
Conservative	Jason Potasso-Justino	3,819	9.3	-4.65	–
Green	Maxime Charron	886	2.2	+0.19	–
Independent	Julie Demers	669	1.6	–	–
Marxist–Leninist	Claude Brunelle	229	0.6	–	–
Strength in Democracy	Jean-Marie Floriant Ndzana	99	0.2	–	–
Total valid votes/Expense limit		41,129	100.0		$203,709.09
Total rejected ballots		859	–	–	
Turnout		41,988	59.2	–	
Eligible voters		70,815			
Liberal hold		Swing		–	
Source: Elections Canada

Canadian federal by-election, November 25, 2013: Bourassa
Party	Candidate	Votes	%	±%	Expenditures
Liberal	Emmanuel Dubourg	8,825	48.12	+7.21	$ 86,108.33
New Democratic	Stéphane Moraille	5,766	31.44	−0.84	87,240.19
Bloc Québécois	Daniel Duranleau	2,387	13.02	−3.04	81,591.19
Conservative	Rida Mahmoud	852	4.65	−4.17	21,442.95
Green	Danny Polifroni	368	2.01	+0.40	34,300.92
Rhinoceros	Serge Lavoie	140	0.76		216.08
Total valid votes/expense limit		18,338	100.0	–	$ 89,016.17
Total rejected ballots		295	1.58	−0.19	
Turnout		18,633	26.22	−28.90	
Eligible voters		69,527			
Liberal hold		Swing		+4.05	
By-election due to the resignation of Denis Coderre.
Source(s) "November 25, 2013 By-elections". Elections Canada. 26 November 2013. "November 25, 2013 By-election – Financial Reports (as reviewed)".

=== Provincial results ===
2012 Quebec general election
Party	Candidate	Votes	%	±%
Liberal	Emmanuel Dubourg	11,788	47.28	-11.33
Parti Québécois	Gabriel Arbieto Munayco	5,900	23.66	-2.52
Coalition Avenir Québec	Walid Hadid	3,103	12.44	+5.95*
Québec solidaire	Geneviève Fortier-Moreau	2,873	11.52	+6.51
Option nationale	Simon-Pierre Bélanger	740	2.97	–
Green	Eric Perreault-Chamberland	530	2.13	-1.59
Total valid votes		24,934	98.48	–
Total rejected ballots		384	1.52	–
Turnout		25,318	62.35	+17.83
Electors on the lists		40,605	–	–
Liberal hold		Swing		-4.40

* Result compared to Action démocratique

2008 Quebec general election
Party	Candidate	Votes	%	±%
Liberal	Emmanuel Dubourg	10,705	58.60	+6.68
Parti Québécois	Martine Banolok	4,783	26.18	+4.45
Action démocratique	Martin Fournier	1,186	6.49	-10.22
Québec solidaire	Rosa Matilde Dutra	915	5.01	+0.06
Green	Michel Cummings	678	3.71	-0.99
Total valid votes		18,267	98.03	–
Total rejected ballots		368	1.97	–
Turnout		18,635	44.52	-14.81
Electors on the lists		41,859	–	–

2007 Quebec general election
Party	Candidate	Votes	%	±%
Liberal	Emmanuel Dubourg	12,917	51.92	-13.21
Parti Québécois	Naima Mimoune	5,406	21.73	-0.87
Action démocratique	Sylvie Fontaine	4,157	16.71	+7.86
Québec solidaire	Valérie Lavoie	1,231	4.95	+3.54*
Green	Simon Bernier	1,169	4.70	–
Total valid votes		24,880	98.39	–
Total rejected ballots		407	1.61	–
Turnout		25,287	59.33	-3.48
Electors on the lists		42,619	–	–

* Result compared to UFP
