= Brampton South (federal electoral district) =

Federal electoral district in Ontario, Canada

Coordinates: 43.656°N 79.757°W

Ontario electoral district
- Interactive map of riding boundaries from the 2025 federal election

Federal electoral district
- Legislature: House of Commons
MP
Sonia Sidhu
Liberal
- District created: 2013
- First contested: 2015
- Last contested: 2025
- District webpage: profile, map

Demographics
- Population (2016): 121,188
- Electors (2021): 76,003
- Area (km²): 46.73
- Pop. density (per km²): 2,593.4
- Census division: Peel
- Census subdivision: Brampton (part)

Brampton South (French: Brampton-Sud) is a federal electoral district in the Peel Region of Ontario.

Brampton South was created by the 2012 federal electoral boundaries redistribution and was legally defined in the 2013 representation order. It came into effect upon the call of the 42nd Canadian federal election, scheduled for October 2015. It was created out of the electoral district of Brampton West.

== Demographics ==
According to the 2021 Canadian census

Languages: 44.4% English, 18.8% Punjabi, 3.7% Urdu, 3.2% Gujarati, 3.0% Hindi, 2.1% Portuguese, 1.6% Tagalog, 1.6% Tamil, 1.4% Spanish

Religions: 37.4% Christian (18.5% Catholic, 2.4% Pentecostal, 1.9% Anglican, 1.4% United Church, 13.2% Other), 21.9% Sikh, 17.1% Hindu, 9.1% Muslim, 1.3% Buddhist, 12.6% None

Median income: $35,600 (2020)

Average income: $45,920 (2020)

Panethnic groups in Brampton South (2011−2021)
Panethnic group	2021		2016		2011	
Panethnic group	Pop.	%	Pop.	%	Pop.	%
South Asian	63,475	49.16%	49,950	41.51%	38,125	35.95%
European (Note: Statistic includes all persons that did not make up part of a visible minority or an indigenous identity.)	31,825	24.65%	39,030	32.44%	41,965	39.57%
African	14,500	11.23%	13,775	11.45%	12,440	11.73%
Southeast Asian (Note: Statistic includes total responses of "Filipino" and "Southeast Asian" under visible minority section on census.)	6,620	5.13%	6,040	5.02%	5,590	5.27%
Middle Eastern (Note: Statistic includes total responses of "West Asian" and "Arab" under visible minority section on census.)	2,485	1.92%	1,985	1.65%	785	0.74%
East Asian (Note: Statistic includes total responses of "Chinese", "Korean", and "Japanese" under visible minority section on census.)	2,105	1.63%	2,135	1.77%	1,565	1.48%
Latin American	2,100	1.63%	2,110	1.75%	1,835	1.73%
Indigenous	720	0.56%	1,185	0.98%	985	0.93%
Other/multiracial (Note: Statistic includes total responses of "Visible minority, n.i.e." and "Multiple visible minorities" under visible minority section on census.)	5,295	4.1%	4,110	3.42%	2,760	2.6%
Total responses	129,130	97.27%	120,320	99.28%	106,050	98.78%
Total population	132,752	100%	121,188	100%	107,364	100%
Notes: Totals greater than 100% due to multiple origin responses. Demographics based on 2012 Canadian federal electoral redistribution riding boundaries.

== Members of Parliament ==
This riding has elected the following members of Parliament:

Parliament	Years	Member	Party
Brampton South; Riding created from Brampton West
42nd	2015–2019	Sonia Sidhu	Liberal
43rd	2019–2021	Sonia Sidhu	Liberal
44th	2021–2025	Sonia Sidhu	Liberal
45th	2025–present	Sonia Sidhu	Liberal

== Election results ==
Graph of election results in Brampton South (minor parties that never got 2% of the vote or didn't run consistently are omitted)

2025 Canadian federal election
Party	Candidate	Votes	%	±%	Expenditures
Liberal	Sonia Sidhu	22,001	49.33	–4.55	
Conservative	Sukhdeep Kang	21,193	47.52	+18.06	
New Democratic	Rajni Sharma	777	1.74	–11.79	
People's	Vijay Kumar	358	0.80	–2.07	
Independent	Manmohan Khroud	274	0.61	N/A	
Total valid votes/expense limit		44,603	99.07	+0.27	
Total rejected ballots		418	0.93	-0.27	
Turnout		45,021	66.25	+11.08	
Eligible voters		67,956			
Liberal hold		Swing		–11.31	
Source: Elections Canada

2021 federal election redistributed results
Party	Vote	%
Liberal	19,044	53.88
Conservative	10,413	29.46
New Democratic	4,784	13.53
People's	1,016	2.87
Others	91	0.26

2021 Canadian federal election
Party	Candidate	Votes	%	±%	Expenditures
Liberal	Sonia Sidhu	21,120	50.98	+1.51	$97,785.16
Conservative	Ramandeep Brar	12,596	30.40	+2.00	$75,417.63
New Democratic	Tejinder Singh	5,894	14.23	-2.17	$13,391.87
People's	Nicholas Craniotis	1,820	4.39	3.67	$2,380.47
Total valid votes/expense limit		41,439	–	–	$109,088.26
Total rejected ballots		503	1.20		
Turnout		41,933	55.17	-7.59	
Eligible voters		76,003			
Source: Elections Canada

2019 Canadian federal election: Brampton South
Party	Candidate	Votes	%	±%	Expenditures
Liberal	Sonia Sidhu	24,085	49.47	-2.62	$92,936.55
Conservative	Ramandeep Brar	13,828	28.40	-6.64	$98,182.77
New Democratic	Mandeep Kaur	7,985	16.40	+5.75	$53,224.68
Green	Karen Fraser	1,926	3.95	+1.73	none listed
People's	Rajwinder Ghuman	354	0.72		none listed
Christian Heritage	Wavey Mercer	285	0.58		none listed
Canada's Fourth Front	Mitesh Joshi	152	0.31		$8,217.30
Marxist–Leninist	Dagmar Sullivan	68	0.13		$20.00
Total valid votes/expense limit		48,863	100.0		
Total rejected ballots		583			
Turnout		49,266	62.76		
Eligible voters		78,487			
Liberal hold		Swing		+2.01	
Source: Elections Canada

2015 Canadian federal election: Brampton South
Party	Candidate	Votes	%	±%	Expenditures
Liberal	Sonia Sidhu	23,681	52.09	+16.70	$101,341.55
Conservative	Kyle Seeback	15,929	35.04	-10.37	$105,913.36
New Democratic	Amarjit Sangha	4,843	10.65	-5.77	$37,089.45
Green	Shaun Hatton	1,011	2.22	-0.04	$144.64
Total valid votes/expense limit		45,464	100.00		$205,155.00
Total rejected ballots		270	0.59	–	
Turnout		45,734	63.42	–	
Eligible voters		72,111			
Liberal gain from Conservative		Swing		+13.53	
Source: Elections Canada

2011 federal election redistributed results
Party	Vote	%
Conservative	16,145	45.40
Liberal	12,584	35.39
New Democratic	5,838	16.42
Green	805	2.26
Others	186	0.52

== See also ==
- List of Canadian electoral districts
- Historical federal electoral districts of Canada
