= Pharala =

- village
- Location in Punjab, India Pharala (India)
- Coordinates: 31.2248°N 75.8826°E
- Country: India
- State: Punjab
- District: Nawanshahr

Population (2001)
  - Total: 3,496

Languages
  - Official: Punjabi
- Time zone: UTC+5:30 (IST)
- PIN: 144503
- Vehicle registration: PB-
- Coastline: 0 kilometres (0 mi)
- Nearest city: Phagwara

Pharala is a village in the tehsil of Nawanshahr, Nawanshahr district (also known as Shahid Bhagat Singh Nagar), in Punjab, India.

== Demographics ==
According to the 2001 Census, Pharala has a population of 3,496 people. Neighbouring villages include Bharoli, Sandhwan, Anokharwal, Behram, Munna and Ghumana.

The most popular last names in Pharala is Atwal.Other last names in the village are Sahota, Bal, Gill, Pannu, Mattu, Chumber, Uppal, Sandhu, Bansal, Bagga, Maan, Nijjar, Bali, Awasthi, Shreedhar,Sangar(Kaushal) Talwar, Kainth, Abrol and Bhagirath

== History ==
According to local tradition, Pharala was founded by Baba Hadal Atwal. Baba Hadal was married to a woman from Sandhwan. Since then the village has been known as "Sandhwan-Pharala".

Villagers believe that Baba Hadal had three brothers. One moved and founded Chitti Jalandhar district), one moved and founded Khurad Pur (Jalandhar district) and Adampur and the third moved and founded a village in Gurdaspur district known as "Atwal". Atwal families in Bir Puadh (Kapurthala district) ,Atti near Goraya hail from Pharala.

== Around Pharala ==
Pharala has a historic Gurudwara known as Gurudwara Guru Har Rai Sahib Ji, who visited this place during the Mughal era on the course of his journey to Sri Anandpur Sahib. The village also has a government senior secondary school, the Shiv Mandir, Gurdwara Lasurha Sahib, Dera Dudha-Dhari, the shrine of Bhajan Dass Ji, Masjid, Gurdwara Guru Ravidas Ji and Balmik Mandir and a sports stadium.
