= Bir Puadh =

- village
- Location in Punjab, India Bir Puadh (India)
- Coordinates: 31.2413982°N 75.7957828°E
- Country: India
- State: Punjab
- District: Kapurthala

Population (2001)
  - Total: 379

Languages
  - Official: Punjabi
- Time zone: UTC+5:30 (IST)
- Vehicle registration: PB-
- Coastline: 0 kilometres (0 mi)

Bir Puadh is a village in the tehsil of Phagwara, Kapurthala district, in Punjab, India.

== Demographics ==
According to the 2001 Census, Bir Puadh has a population of 379 people. Neighbouring villages include Bhulla Rai, Akarlgarh, Dhak Khalwara and Khalwara.

== History ==
According to local tradition, Bir Puadh was first settled by the Atwal families, hailing from Pharala, in Nawanshahr district. Accordingly, the Atwal Jathera is in Pharala.
