= Ghumana =

Ghumana Ghuman/ Ghumman/ Ghummana
- village
- Location in Punjab, India Ghumana (India)
- Coordinates: 31.2583484°N 75.8624518°E
- Country: India
- State: Punjab
- District: Nawanshahr

Population (2001)
  - Total: 2,544

Languages
  - Official: Punjabi
- Time zone: UTC+ 5:30 (IST)
- Vehicle registration: PB-32
- Coastline: 0 kilometres (0 mi)

Ghuman (also called Ghumana) is a village in Tehsil Nawanshahr, Nawanshahr district (also known as Shaheed Bhagat Singh Nagar), in Punjab, India.

== Demographics ==
According to the 2001 Census, Ghumana has a population of 2,544 people. Neighbouring villages include Mahliana, Dhak Malikhpur, Mangat Dhingrian, Manaka, Bharoli, Pharala, Munna, Pandori, and Dhak Pandori.

This village is also known as Ghumana-Manaka. This village is in Nawanshahr (also known as Shaheed Bhagat Singh Nagar).

This is so famous for Krishan leela mela (known as Krishan Ji Birth festival on ground of Krishan leela ground. 7 days of fare organize on this ground and spend in festival by Brindaban people along with native people of village.

Village is so famous for its growth and religious activities.
