= Pariyar =

Pariyar Pariar
- Village
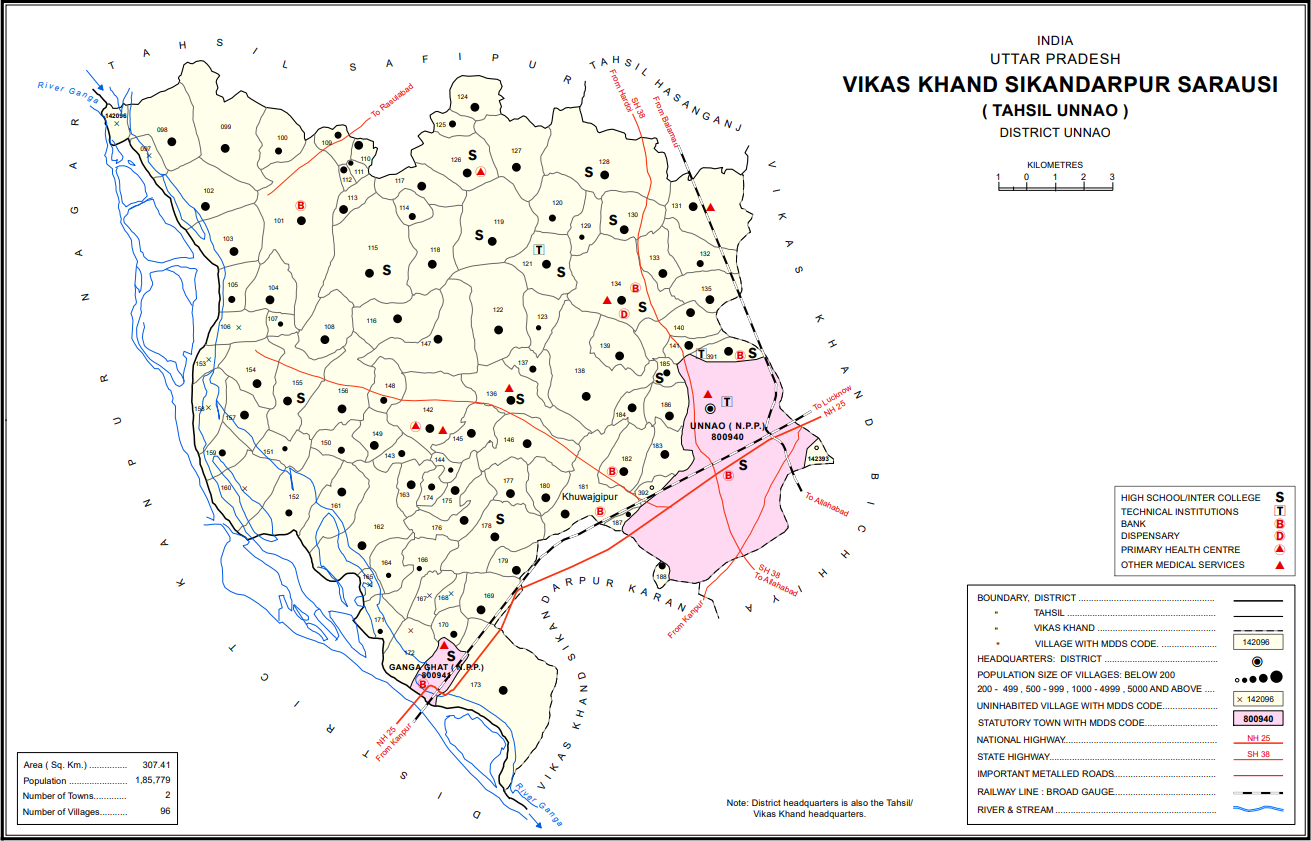
- Map showing Pariyar (#101) in Sikandarpur Sarausi CD block

- Location in Uttar Pradesh, India
- Coordinates: 26°38′N 80°19′E
- Country: India
- State: Uttar Pradesh
- District: Unnao

Area
  - Total: 21.05 km^{2} (8.13 sq mi)

Population (2011)
  - Total: 7,363
  - Density: 349.8/km^{2} (905.9/sq mi)

Languages
  - Official: Hindi
- Time zone: UTC+5:30 (IST)
- Postal code: 209801

Pariyar, also spelled Pariar, is a village in Sikandarpur Sarausi block of Unnao district, Uttar Pradesh, India. It is located on the left bank of the Ganges, 23 km northwest of the city of Unnao. Nearby the village is the Mahua lake. Pariyar holds religious significance to Hindus; it is considered to be the place where the goddess Sita was exiled to, and the birthplace of her two sons Lava and Kusha. The village is known for holding a major fair during the month of Kartika, on the day of the full moon, which is attended by over 100,000 people. Historically, Pariyar was the seat of a pargana since 1785, and under the Nawabs of Awadh it was the seat of a tehsildar. Today, it is the headquarters of a nyaya panchayat. Pariyar is connected by road with Mohan and Rasulabad. As of 2011, its population is 7,363, in 1,355 households.

== Name, history, and legends ==
According to legend, Pariyar is the place where Lakshmana accompanied Sita during her banishment at the behest of his brother (and her husband) Rama. The place (which was then covered by forest) then became known as "Parhar", from the Sanskrit word meaning "to turn out" or "let go" — or, in this case, divorce. Tradition also holds that Sita gave birth to her sons Lava and Kusha here; they were trained in archery by the sage Valmiki and grew up to become formidable warriors. At one point Rama performed the Ashvamedha horse sacrifice by setting the horse Shyambaran loose to wander the countryside and announcing that whoever caught the horse would in doing so be declaring war on him. Lava and Kusha themselves caught the horse at Pariyar, thus leading to a war between Rama and his own sons, whom he did not know. In the temple of Someshwar Mahadeo, there are many arrowheads on display which were supposedly used during this fight; more are sometimes uncovered in the bed of the Ganges.

In 1187, the Dikhit thakur Himanchal Singh is said to have conquered Pariyar from the Lunias, who had been the original zamindars of the place. Under the Nawabs of Awadh, Pariyar was the seat of a tehsildar. At the time of Miyan Almas Ali Khan, one Rup Singh Bachhil built a fort and a walled ganj named Daulatganj here. In 1785, 28 villages were taken out of the existing parganas of Sikandarpur and Safipur and made into a new pargana of Pariyar.
