= Sikandarpur Sarausi =

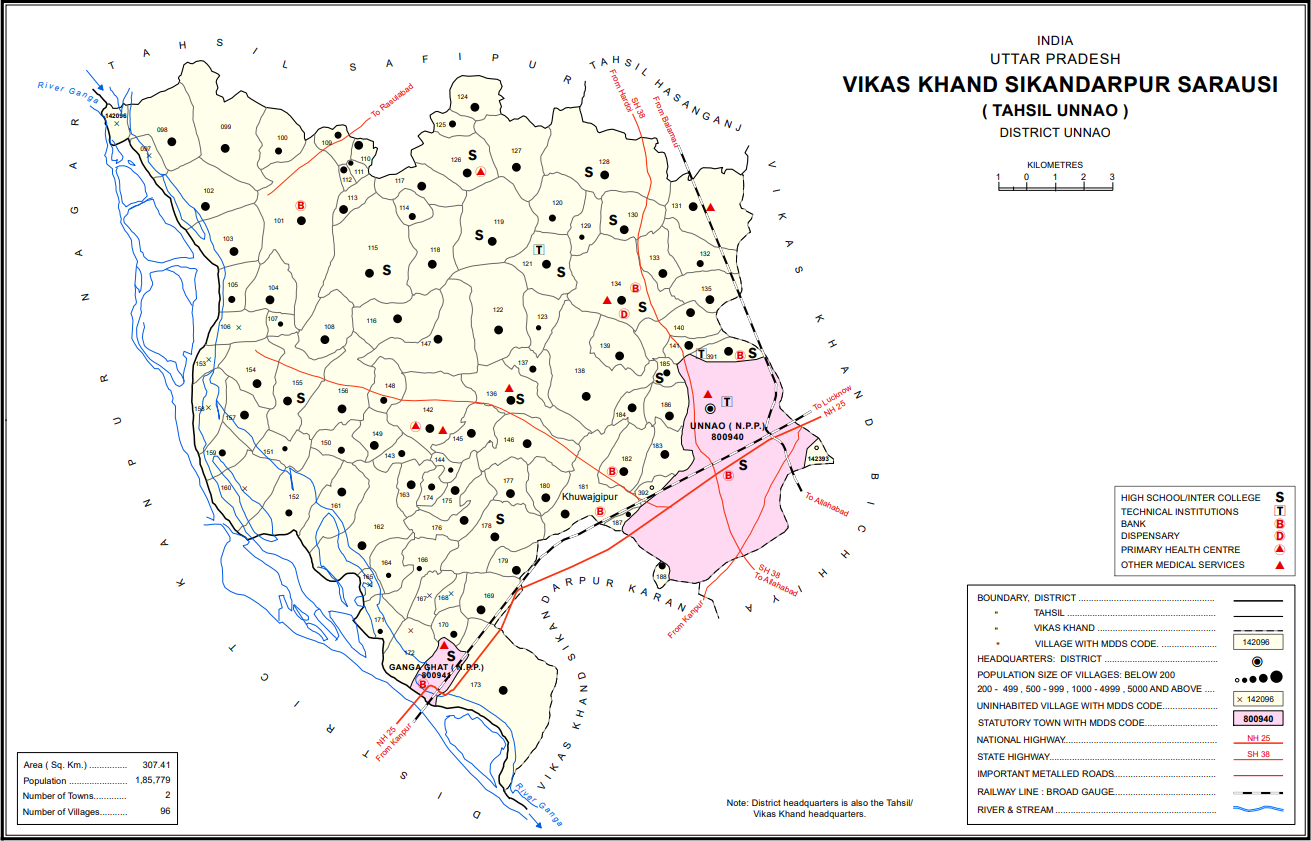
Map of Sikandarpur Sarausi CD block

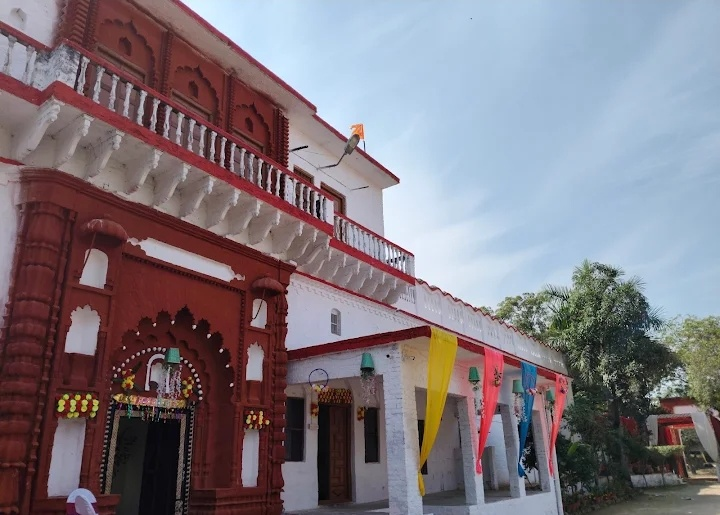
Palace of Sarosi estate

Sikandarpur Sarausi is a community development block in Unnao tehsil of Unnao district, Uttar Pradesh, India. It consists of 96 rural villages, with a total population of 185,779 people.

Historically, there was a pargana of Sarosi, which was created during the reign of Akbar in the 1500s. The pargana was later renamed Sikandarpur after another one of its main villages; C.A. Elliott wrote in 1862 that the name change had "recently become habitual" then.

The present block was inaugurated on 1 October 1961 in order to oversee implementation of India's Five-Year Plans at a local and rural level. It was one of two blocks in the district (the other being Safipur) that was selected for implementation of the applied nutrition programme. Sikandarpur, the old pargana's namesake, was chosen as the block headquarters.

== Demographics ==
As of 2011, Sikandarpur Sarausi CD block has a population of 185,779 people, in 36,202 households. This population includes 98,687 males and 87,092 females. The corresponding sex ratio of 883 females to every 1000 males is lower than the district rural average of 906. About 14.4% of the block's population is in the 0-6 age group as of 2011. The sex ratio of this group is 931, which is higher than the rural average of 923 for Unnao district. Members of Scheduled Castes make up 26.5% of the block's population, the lowest proportion among the district's 16 CD blocks, and members of Scheduled Tribes make up 0.02%. The literacy rate of Sikandarpur Sarausi block is 61.9% (counting only people age 7 and up); literacy is higher among men and boys (70.0%) than among women and girls (52.6%). Among Scheduled Castes, the literacy rate is 55.2% — 63.6% among men and boys, and 45.7% among women and girls. The 17.8% gender literacy gap among this group is the lowest among the blocks in Unnao district.

In terms of employment, 24.9% of Sikandarpur Sarausi block residents were classified as main workers (i.e. people employed for at least 6 months per year) in 2011. Marginal workers (i.e. people employed for less than 6 months per year) made up 11.2%, and the remaining 63.9% were non-workers. Employment status varied significantly according to gender, with 52.9% of men being either main or marginal workers, compared to only 17.0% of women.

Agriculture is the predominant source of employment in Sikandarpur Sarausi block: 36.6% of the block's workers were cultivators who owned or leased their own land as of 2011, and a further 32.1% were agricultural labourers who worked someone else's land for wages. Another 3.8% were counted as household industry workers, and the remaining 27.5% were other workers.

== Villages ==
Sikandarpur Sarausi CD block has the following 96 villages:

Village name	Total land area (hectares)	Population (in 2011)
Katri Salempur Bithur	13.6	0
Katri Maraunda Suchit	382.8	0
Marounda Suchit	568.2	2,810
Maraunda Majhwara	451.7	3,423
Saidapur	273.8	882
Pariyar	2,105	7,363
Katri Maraunda Mazhwara	598.6	1,140
Katri Pariyar	930.8	1,033
Bahraula	213.8	1,859
Katri Bahroula	212.5	929
Katri Rampur	94.9	0
Rampur	106.8	498
Atry	285	1,027
Barhali	158.9	571
Sadampur	85.9	1,212
Mubarakpur	38.3	378
Bilari Gozha	54	971
Mominpur	133.8	1,260
Faizpur Sadera	115	913
Bhadevna	827	5,941
Piyarepur	447.7	1,503
Bulandpur	191.1	1,688
Jagdeeshpur	389.8	1,836
Airabhadiyar	656.2	3,783
Nagwa	298.1	958
Parmani	384	1,304
Sathara	768.3	3,784
Amlona	30.2	491
Ishuniya	252.4	2,615
Damgadhi	90.5	812
Kanjaura	424.2	3,123
Bandakhera	460.3	3,071
Raukarna	1,077.2	8,705
Talib Nagar	141	259
Baunamau	318	3,890
Puranisf Pansari	768.6	4,692
Patiyara	205.5	992
Akbarpur Dabauli	270	2,382
Thana	901.4	7,423
Bhatvan	258.9	2,189
Sarosi	564.3	4,920
Sultanpur Grunt	145.9	676
Patari	972.3	8,330
Raje Pur	274.9	2,777
Dostinagar	325.7	3,236
Syed Abbas Pur	248.3	1,802
Sikander Pur	557.9	4,510
Arzhora Mau	167.6	942
Kanjaura	62.5	337
Hafeezabad	255.7	1,420
Chilaula	419.8	2,899
Sihura	592.8	1,022
Silauli Garhi	211.5	971
Gangauli	184.1	1,492
Kanikamau	185.4	860
Bhatpurwa	21.6	361
Lalupur	258.1	758
Katri Basdhana	578.6	0
Basdhana	245.1	1,564
Hajipur	450.1	2,162
Agehra	523.5	2,095
Rautapur	246.4	3,389
Katri Rautapur	335.4	0
Mirzapur	136.4	848
Katri Mirzapur	320.2	0
Sanni	344.5	1,965
Shankarpur Sarai	507.2	4,195
Pipri	210.3	1,594
Kanhawapur	126.8	313
Paharipur	117.9	0
Manbhauna	174.7	437
Hariherpur Gair Ehatmali	143.4	0
Khairaha Gair Ehatmali	62.7	0
Saraiya	137	1,167
Khairaha Ehatmali	119.2	656
Lakhmi Khera	104.1	343
Hariherpur Ehatmali	293	0
Netuwa	32.6	6,300
Mustafapur	71.4	628
Bani	166.2	2,190
Pindorwa	287	1,842
Behta	218.2	2,619
Dewara Kala	652.8	6,317
Dewara Khurd	169.2	1,030
Khatai	182.5	1,385
Khuwajgipur	826.7	7,619
Salempur	172.6	3,422
Chaura	282.3	2,445
Fatehullagnagar	78.8	1,531
Lohar Khera	86.7	536
Barbat	201.6	1,253
Akrampur	282.1	378
Singrausi	422	533
