= Punjabi language writers in the United Kingdom =

In the second half of the twentieth century, a number of Punjabis migrated to the United Kingdom from India, Pakistan and other countries. Among them a number of writers have emerged, writing variously in English and in Punjabi. Among these writers are Amarjit Chandan, Harjeet Atwal, Veena Verma Shivcharan Gill, Sathi Ludhianvi, K.C. Mohan, S.S. Santokh and Yash. In addition to these immigrants, British-born writers are emerging. These include Dominic Rai, Rupinderpal Singh Dhillon and Daljit Nagra.

== Shivcharan Jaggi Kussa ==
Shivcharan Jaggi Kussa was born in the village of Kussa in the Moga district of Punjab, India. He migrated to Austria in 1983, where he served with both the German and Austrian border police. Since 2006, he has been residing in East London, where he has written an impressive collection of 38 Punjabi novels.

Four of his internationally acclaimed novels have been translated into English and are available on Amazon. In addition to his novels, he has written film scripts, screenplays, and dialogues for several feature and short films, many of which have been produced based on his stories. He is currently working on filming his Hindi web series NRI, which he also scripted.

Kussa is best known for his realistic and satirical writing style, focusing on corruption within the Indian police force and Punjabi society at large. Since 2010, he has also contributed as a writer for Punjabi and Hindi films in Bollywood.

Throughout his career, he has received numerous honours, including seven gold medals and seventeen literary awards. Among these are the Nanak Singh Novelist Award from Punjabi Satth Lambra, the Balwant Gargi Award at the Prof. Mohan Singh Mela, and two special recognitions presented at the Parliament of London in 2010 and again in May 2023.

Selected Novels: Purja Purja Cutt Marye, Tavi Ton Talwaar Takk, Bareen Kohi Balda Deeva, Tarkash Tangiya Jandd, Gorkh Da Tilla, Jatt Vaddhiya Bohrh Di Chhaven, Ujjad Gaye Graa'n, Baajh Bhraavo Mariya, Haaji Lok Makke Vall Jande, Etti Maar Payee Kurlaane, Sajjri Paid Da Retta, Rooh Lai Giya Dila'n Da Jaani, Daachi Vaaliya Mod Muhaar Ve, Jogi Uttar Pahaadon Aaye, Chaare Kootan Sunniya, Laggi Vaale Kde Na Saunde, Boddi Vaala Taara Chadhiya, Dila'n Di Jaah, Tobhe Fook, Kulli Yaar Di Surg Da Jhoota, Dard Kehn Darvesh, Kossi Dhupp Da Nigh, Ikk Meri Akkh Kaashni, and Kalla Na Hove Putt Jatt Da, Ucha Burjj Lahore Da, Chhatti Kothdiyan Nau Darvajje...

== Amarjit Chandan ==
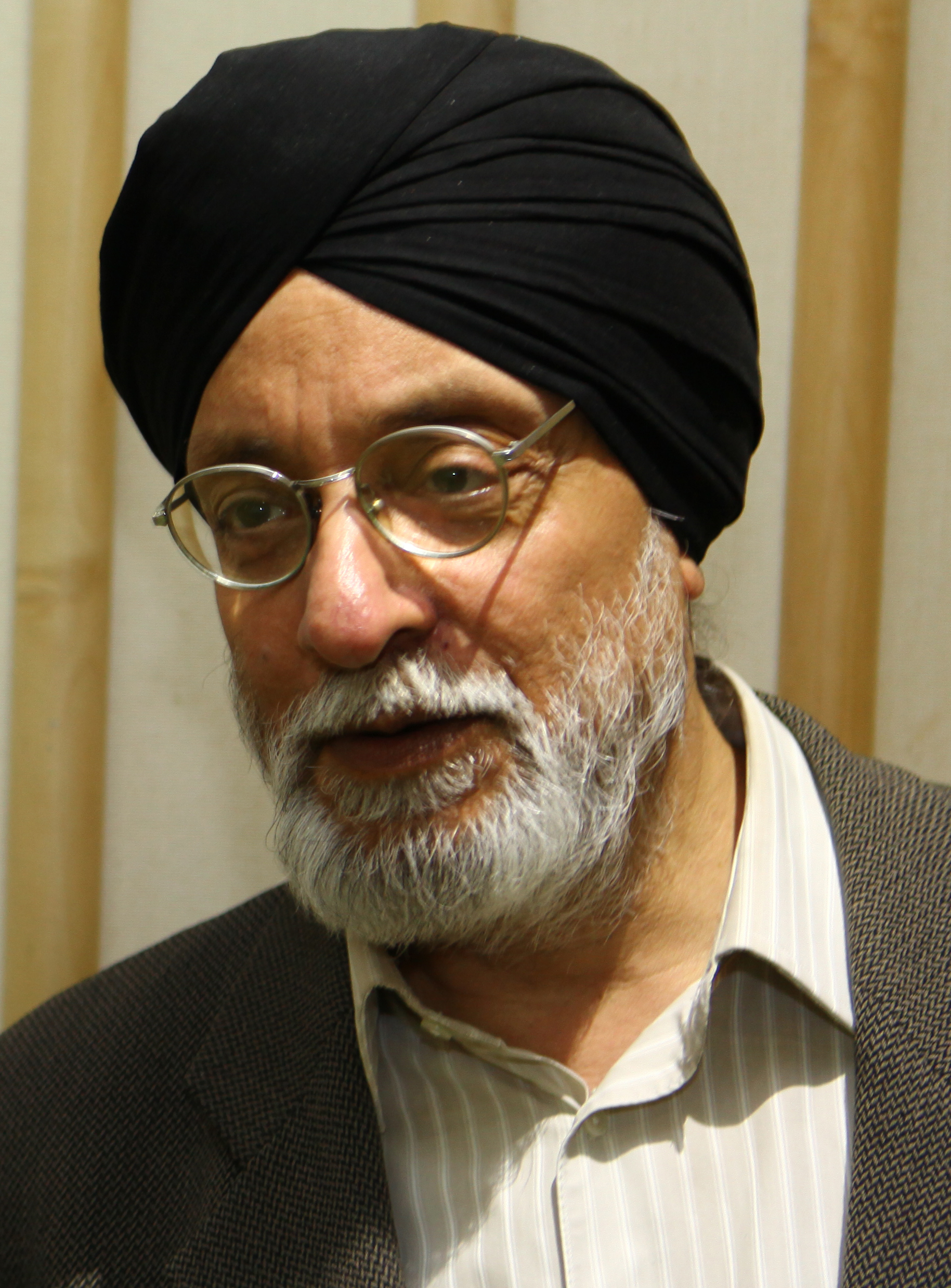
Amarjit Chandan

Amarjit Chandan was born in Nairobi in November 1946. He worked for various Punjabi literary and political magazines, including the Bombay-based Economic and Political Weekly before migrating to England in 1980, where he lives with his radio-broadcaster wife and two sons. He has published eight collections of poetry and two books of essays in Punjabi in the Gurmukhi script and two in the Persian script and one in English translation titled Being Here. His works include Jarhan, Beejak, Chhanna and Guthali. He has edited many anthologies of world poetry and fiction, including two collections of British Punjabi poetry and short stories. His poetry has been published in Greek, Turkish, Hungarian and Romanian and Indian languages. His profile and work is listed on the Danka - Pakistan's Cultural Guide.

== Rupinderpal Singh Dhillon ==
Rupinderpal Singh Dhillon is from West London and writes novels, short stories and poetry in a British form of Punjabi which he taught himself to write. He has also published poetry in English. His debut novel, Neela Noor, was published in 2007. He writes in the locally spoken form of the language influenced by English; His work is mainly influenced by Western literature and confronts social issues including racism, gender bias and incest. Bharind (The Hornet) is a collection of short stories and poetry. In his later novels such as the experimental gothic novel O, he employs a genre he calls Vachitarvaad, which encompasses science fiction, fantasy, horror and magical realism.

== Harjeet Atwal ==
Harjeet Atwal is a Punjabi writer mainly known as a novelist and story-teller. Some of his novels are; One Way, Ret, Sawari, Southall, British Born Desi, Das Saal Das Yug, Early Birds, Geet. He has written seven short stories books, one poetry collection, one travelogue, one biography and many more articles for different news papers and magazines. He is editor of a literary magazine as well named Shabad. Since 1977 he has lived in London. He was born on 8 September 1952 and is married with three children.

== See also ==
- Urdu in the United Kingdom
- British Punjabis
