= Sarosi estate =

Taluqdari estate in Oudh (1540–1947)

Sarosi Estate
- 1540–1947
- Status: Taluqdari estate
- Capital: Sarosi
- Common languages: Awadhi, Hindi
- Religion: Hinduism
- Government: Monarchy
- Chaudhri (Ruler or Chief)
  - 1540: Medni Mal (first)
  - 1947: Chaudhri Kewal Singh (last)
- Historical era: Early modern period
  - Established: 1540
  - Acceded to India: 1947
Succeeded by
Dominion of India
- Today part of: Uttar Pradesh, Republic of India

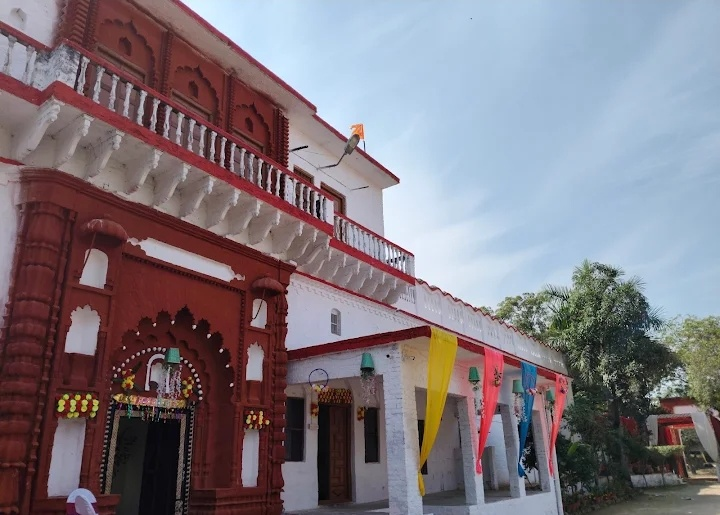
Sarosi Palace

Sarosi also spelled Sarausi, formerly an estate (Taluqdari) in Oudh, British India which was ruled by the Parihar clan of the Rajputs. Now it is part of Unnao district in Uttar Pradesh, India.

== History ==
Sikandarpur pargana is historically associated with the Parihar Thakurs, whose principal seat is at Sarosi. The pargana is said to have been formally constituted during the reign of Akbar (A.D. 1565). Its earlier name was Burhanpur; however, in A.D. 1297, Sikandar Khan, an agent under Alauddin Khalji, renamed it Sikandarpur. By 1535 A.D., the pargana was held by Harju Mal Dhobi. In the period of instability following the murder of Hanwant Singh by the Saiyids of Unnao, during the reign of Humayun, control of the area passed to the Dhobi community, who received it as a jagir from the Delhi court. Subsequently, during the reign of Sher Shah Suri, and while Humayun was in exile in Persia, Harju Mal Dhobi was killed in 1540 A.D. by Medni Mal, a Parihar Thakur of Jigini, who is regarded as the ancestor of the present taluqdar.

The history of this clan is thus described in Sir Charles Alfred Elliott's Chronicles of Unnao, pp. 58-60:—

The Parihar community in the Unnao district is primarily settled in the pargana of Sarosi, which is also commonly referred to as Sikandarpur. They traditionally hold a group of 84 villages, a territorial unit known as a Chaurasi. According to local traditions, the Parihars trace their origin to a place called Jigini, or identified with Srinagar, i.e., Kashmir.

The settlement of the clan's ancestors at Sarosi is historically linked to the reign of Humayun, the Emperor of Delhi. A matrimonial alliance took place between a Dikhit girl from Parenda and the son of the Parihar Raja of Jigini, located across the Yamuna. The wedding procession, accompanied by a substantial escort, passed through Sarosi. Inquiring about the nearby fort's rulers revealed that it was held by Dhobis and other Shudras who owned the surrounding land. Post the Holi festival, a party led by Bhagay Singh returned to Sarosi. During the festival's evening, they seized the fort when the guards were inebriated, securing control of both the fort and the adjacent territory.

Following Bhagay Singh's passing, his estate, comprising eighty-four villages, was divided among his four sons. Asis and Salhu, the two eldest sons, inherited the majority of the estate. Asis received twenty villages, while Salhu obtained forty-two. The third son, Manik, embraced a life of devotion and refrained from involvement in worldly affairs. The youngest son, Bhuledhan, received a share determined by his older brothers, who treated him fairly. Bhuledhan took the share allocated by his siblings, and there is no indication that he was mistreated in the distribution.

The family's inheritance practices did not follow the law of primogeniture, leading to a continual subdivision of the ancestral estate as each son claimed a separate share upon maturity and marriage. This trend persisted for six generations until the era of Hira Singh. During his time, the family's property had significantly diminished, and Hira Singh faced the task of dividing it among his five sons. Hira Singh also encountered legal troubles, leading to his imprisonment at Faizabad.

Escaping from custody, Hira Singh sought refuge in Sarosi, prompting him to send his third son, Kalandar Singh, to join the company's army. Kalandar Singh's rise to Subedar-major in the 49th Regiment of Native Infantry marked a turning point. Recognizing the vulnerability of the Parihar zamindars to local authorities upon his eventual passing, Kalandar Singh devised a strategy. He convinced the brotherhood members descended from Asis to aggregate their individually divided holdings into a nominal large estate, with his nephew, Gulab Singh, serving as the representative taluqdar.

This arrangement, maintained from 1840 until British annexation, presented a unified front to potential oppressors, deterring unjust treatment of the Parihar zamindars. During this period, the estate was held solely in the name of Gulab Singh, offering protection against further oppressions by external authorities.

In 1840, during the reign of Muhammad Ali Shah (1837–42), Gulab Singh of Sarosi consolidated the possessions of various branches of the Parihar Rajputs into a substantial estate. Chaudhri Gulab Singh, the nominal head of the Parihars, oversaw this unification and was succeeded by his son, Chaudhri Fateh Bahadur Singh. Subsequently, the estate came under the rule of Chaudhri Chandan Singh, succeeded by Chaudhri Kewal Singh.

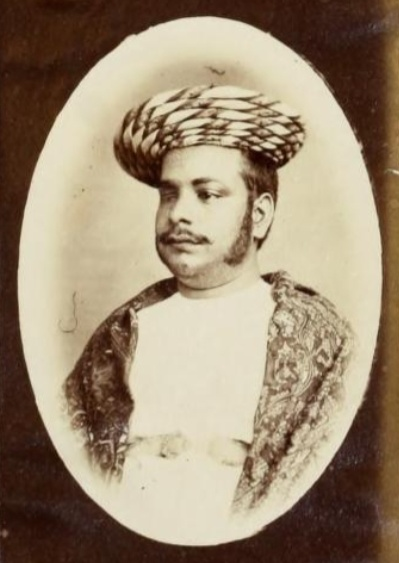
Chaudhri Fateh Bahadur Singh

Following India's independence on August 15, 1947, the Sarosi (Taluq) estate was integrated into the Dominion of India and later the Republic of India. Chaudhri Kewal Singh, the last ruler of Sarosi served as an MLC. After his death, his elder son Chaudhri Veer Pal Singh proceeded as Titular ruler of Sarosi. Chaudhri Veer Pal Singh was firstly married to Chaudhrani Aditya Prabha Singh, daughter of Raja Rananjay Singh of Amethi Estate and secondly married to Chaudhrani Sheela Singh.

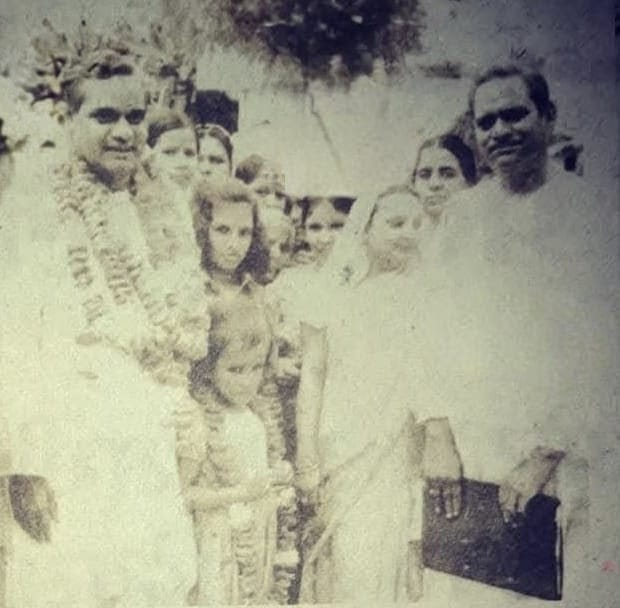
Chaudhri Veer Pal Singh and his wife Chaudhrani Sheela Singh with Atal Bihari Vajpayee

== List of rulers ==
The rulers of Sarosi bore the title of Chaudhri. The list of rulers is following as:

- Medni Mal (around 1540)
- Chaudhri Bhagay Singh
- Chaudhri Asis Sah
- Chaudhri Sakat Singh
- Chaudhri Mangal Sah
- Chaudhri Dipchand Singh
- Chaudhri Zorawar Singh
- Chaudhri Jindh Sah
- Chaudhri Hira Singh
- Chaudhri Pancham Singh
- Chaudhri Gulab Singh
- Chaudhri Fateh Bahadur Singh
- Chaudhri Chandan Singh
- Chaudhri Kewal Singh
- Chaudhri Veer Pal Singh
- Chaudhri Rajesh Singh

== See also ==
- Unnao
