= Harpreet Sekha =

Writer

Harpreet Sekha is a Canadian writer who has written three anthologies of short-stories. He won the runner-up Dhahan Prize in 2018 for his short-story collection Prism.

== Biography ==
Harpreet was born in village Sekha Kalan in Moga district, Punjab, India and moved to Canada in 1988 along with his family after abandoning his engineering in Punjab. He went to work many odd jobs such as picking fruits, driving taxis and working in factories. He also penned his experiences as a taxi driver in his memoir titled "Taxinama". He received a diploma in Mechanical Engineering and is currently working as Computer Numerical Control Machinist.

Now, he lives with his family in Surrey, British Columbia, Canada.

== Works ==
- Bee Jee Muskura Paye (2006)
- Baaran Buhe (2013)
- Taxinama (2011)
- Prism (2017)
- Qile De Moti (2017) – Punjabi translation of Jewels of the Qila

== Awards ==
- 2018 – Dhahan Prize runner-up for book "Prism"
- 2021 – Urmila Anand Memorial Award
