= Atwal =

Surname list

Atwal or Athwal is a Sikh surname of Jats.

== Notable people ==
Notable people with the surname, who may or may not be affiliated with the clan, include:

- Arjun Atwal, Indian golfer
- A. S. Atwal, Indian police officer
- Charanjit Singh Atwal, Indian politician
- Dilbagh Singh Athwal, Indian-American geneticist
- Harjeet Atwal, British Punjabi writer
- Inder Iqbal Singh Atwal, Indian politician
- Jas Athwal, British politician
- Jaspal Atwal, Canadian businessman
- Taj Atwal, British Indian actress
