= Avtar Singh Billing =

Punjabi writer

- Born: Avtar Singh Billing; 13 December 1952 (age 73); Village Seh, District Ludhiana, Indian Punjab, India
- Education: A S College Khanna SCD Government College Ludhiana Govt College of Education Sector 20 Chandigarh
- Occupations: Novelist, story writer

Avtar Singh Billing (born December 13, 1952) is a Punjabi writer, novelist and story writer. He has written 8 novels, 6 short-story collections and three books on children's literature.

His novel Khali Khoohaan di Katha (The Tale of Empty Wells) won The Dhahan Prize in 2014.

== Writings ==
=== Novels ===
- Naranjan Mashalchi
- Khere Sukh Vehre Sukh
- Khali Khoohaan di Katha(The Tale of Empty Wells)
- Rizak (livelihood)
- Garibi Gada Hamari (Is the biography on Gyani Amar Singh Chakar) source grandson of Gyani Amar Singh Chakar (Maheep Singh)

== Awards ==
- Shiromani Sahitkar - Government of Punjab
- The Dhahan Prize for novel "Khali Khoohaan di Katha" (2014)
