= Madhopur, Jalandhar =

Madhopur
- Village
- Location in Punjab, India Madhopur (India)
- Coordinates: 31°34′36″N 75°40′13″E
- Country: India
- State: Punjab
- District: Jalandhar

Government
  - sarpanch: Sangha

Languages
  - Official: Punjabi
- Time zone: UTC+5:30 (IST)
- PIN: 144201

Madhopur is a village inhabited mostly by scheduled castes, while Bhogpur is a town and a nagar panchayat in Jalandhar district in the state of Punjab, India.

Bhogpur is the first city in India to have its own website.

Bhogpur's sugar mill is first co-operative sugar mill and is still running.

== About ==
Madhopur lies on the Jalandhar-Pathankot road, which is almost 5 km from it. The nearest railway station to Madhopur is the Bhogpur railway station, 4.5 km away.

== Post code ==
Madhopur's Post code is 144201.

== See also ==
1. Balbir Madhopuri (Punjabi writer)
