= Salindh =

Coordinates: 26°44′26.52″N 80°21′29.43″E

Salindh is a small village which borders the town of Safipur in the Unnao district (located between Lucknow and Kanpur) of the Indian state of Uttar Pradesh.

== Location ==
Salindh is seventeen kilometers (just under 11 miles) from Unnao district and one kilometer (0.6 miles) from Safipur.

== Economy ==
The main economic occupation is agriculture, in particular a mango plantation.

== Festivals ==
The annual ‘gagar’ festival celebrates the anniversary of Saint Makhdoom Saheb.

== Demographics ==
The demographic groups that live in Salindh are Chamars, Ahirs, Nai, Telis, Kurmis, and Muslims.

In the mid-20th century, poverty and land issues drove a few people to migrate to Lucknow, Kanpur, Unnao, Bombay, and even some foreign countries.
