= Sarghi Jammu =

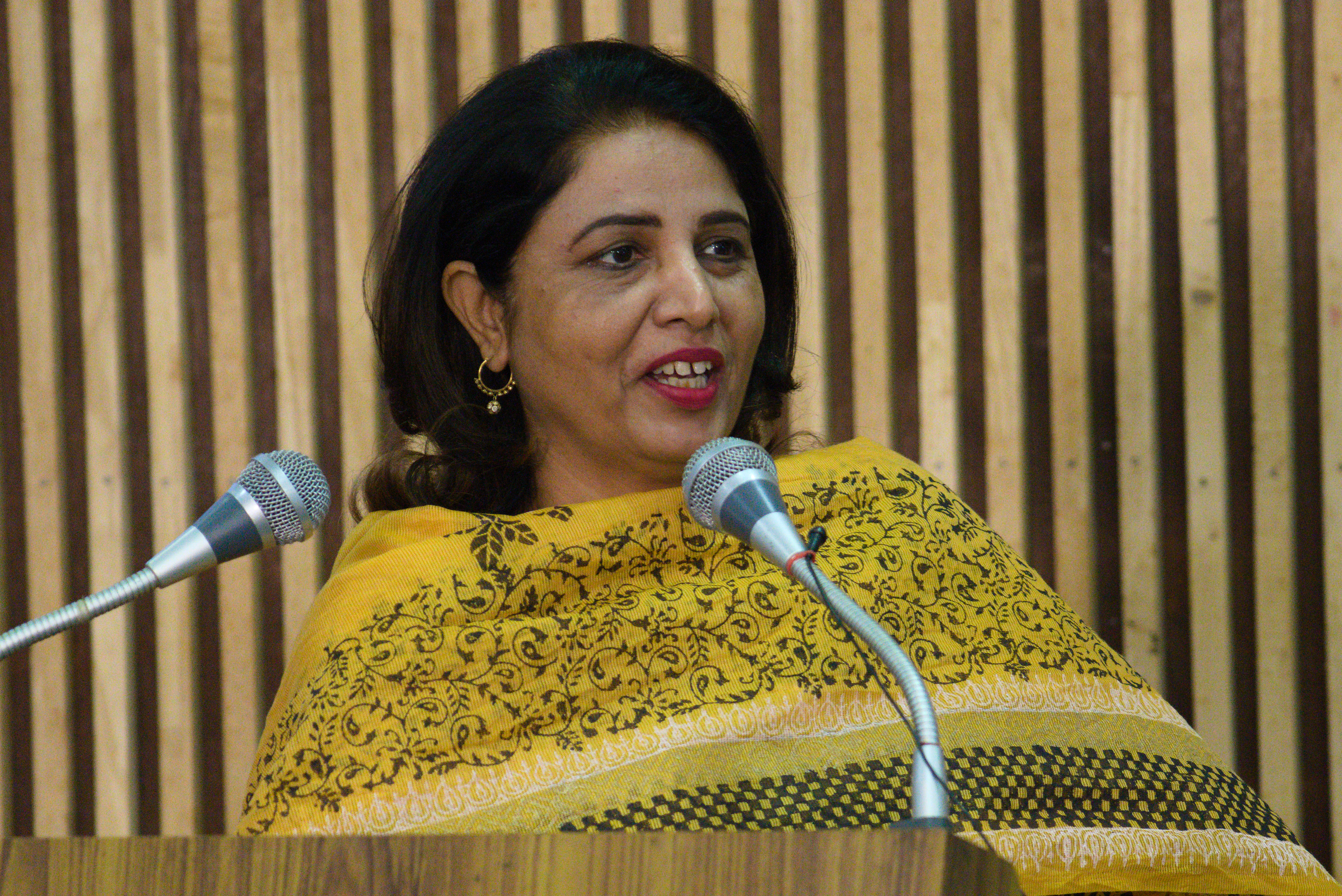
Jammu at Punjabi University on 5 April 2022

Sarghi Jammu is a Punjabi author and academic. She was one of the finalists for the 2021 Dhahan Prize for her short-story collection Apne Apne Marseia.

== Biography ==
Jammu is the daughter of Punjabi author Dalbir Chetan. She completed her PhD in Punjabi folklore and is an assistant professor in Punjabi at Sri Guru Angad Dev College, Khadur Sahib, Tarn-Taran.

== Works ==
- Sam Drishti (2002)
- Khilrey Haraf (2003)
- Chetan Katha (2005)
- Vida Hon Toh Pehla (2009)
- Punjabi Kahani Vich Lokdhara Da Unsarn Te Rapuntar (2018)
- Apne Apne Marseia (2020)

== Awards ==
- 2021 - Dhahan Prize Finalist for her book "Apne Apne Marseia"
