= Gurdev Singh Rupana =

Indian Writer

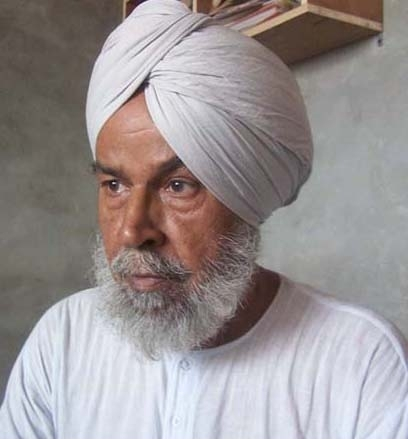
- Born: 13 April 1936; Rupana, Sri Muktsar Sahib, Punjab
- Died: 5 December 2021 (aged 85); Rupana, Sri Muktsar Sahib, Punjab
- Occupation: author
- Writing career
- Language: Punjabi
- Period: ਭਾਰਤ ਦੀ ਆਜ਼ਾਦੀ ਤੋਂ ਬਾਅਦ - 2021
- Genre: ਕਹਾਣੀ
- Subject: ਸਮਾਜਕ
- Literary movement: ਸਮਾਜਵਾਦ

Gurdev Singh Rupana (13 April 1936 - 5 December 2021) was a Punjabi short story writer. He won the Sahitya Akademi Award in 2020 and was a finalist for the Dhahan Prize in 2019 for his short story collection Aam Khaas.

== Biography ==
Rupana did his post-graduation studies in Punjabi literature from the Delhi University. He started his career as a schoolteacher in Delhi.

He went on to do a PhD about the life and works of Punjabi poet Qadir Yar.

He died at the age of 85 in his native village, Rupana of Sri Muktsar Sahib district. He is survived by his wife Gurmail Kaur and two sons; Nempal Singh and Preetpal Singh Rupana.
