= Jaspal Atwal =

Indo-Canadian businessman (born 1955)

- Born: Jaspal Singh Atwal; 1955 (age 70–71); Pharala, Punjab, India
- Organization: International Sikh Youth Federation
- Known for: Khalistan movement

Jaspal Singh Atwal (born 1955) is an Indo-Canadian businessman convicted of attempted murder for his role in the 1986 attempt to assassinate Punjab minister Malkiat Singh Sidhu. A Khalistani sympathizer and member of the now-banned militant group International Sikh Youth Federation, he was also involved in the 1985 attack of Ujjal Dosanjh, a strong opposer of the Khalistani movement who would later become the 33rd Premier of British Columbia. In 2010, he was accused of being part of an automobile fraud case but was ruled out by the Supreme Court of Canada. In February 2018, Atwal gained national attention when he was invited by Canadian prime minister Justin Trudeau to a reception during a visit to India and would eventually have his invitation revoked the next day. That same year, he was arrested for issuing death threats to a local radio in British Columbia.

== Background ==
Jaspal Atwal was originally from Pharala near Phagwara district in Punjab, India. He left for Canada at a young age and claimed to study at British Columbia Institute of Technology. He visited India once in the past few years, with a Facebook post of him visiting the Taj Mahal. He is involved in construction business and is currently associated with Media Wave Communications, which runs a Surrey-based online radio station. He was also involved in numerous liberal campaigns and was seen taking pictures with hockey star Wayne Gretzky and other liberal politicians such as Sukh Dhaliwal, Justin Trudeau, and Michael Ignatieff.

== Controversies ==
=== Assassination attempts ===
In 1985, Atwal was charged in an attack on Ujjal Dosanjh, a strong opposer of the Khalistan movement, but was later acquitted. Dosanjh stated that Atwal attacked him with an iron bar over his opposition to Sikh extremism. The attack left Dosanjh severely injured with 80 stitches and a broken hand. Senior Punjab journalist Baljit Balli, who met Atwal during a radio talk show at Surrey, said that Atwal had claimed that he was not involved in any attack and that he was being wrongly charged. Dosanjh would go on to be the 33rd Premier of British Columbia. On 25 May 1986, Atwal was among four men involved in attempting to assassinate Punjab minister Malkiat Singh Sidhu. He was convicted for murder and was sentenced to 20 years in jail, where he served 5 years before being paroled. At the time of the attempted assassination, Sidhu was visiting Vancouver for a wedding and was forced off an isolated road near Gold River when Atwal arrived. Sidhu was struck twice and survived the shooting, however, he was assassinated in 1991 five years later at his home. At the parole, Atwal admitted he was the shooter that day.

=== Justin Trudeau visit to India ===
Atwal sparked controversy when he was invited by Justin Trudeau to a reception during a visit to India. He was seen photographed with Sophie Grégoire Trudeau and Infrastructure Minister Amarjeet Sohi at an event in Mumbai and was invited to the event by Randeep Sarai. Ujjal Dosanjh criticized Trudeau for inviting Atwal by stating "Do you have no shame?" and stated that the relations between Canada and India were rock bottom. Atwal's invitation was rescinded the next day and Trudeau stated that he should have never been invited. He was removed from India's travel blacklist several months ago, while the Indian government stated that he wasn't a security threat. Conservative Leader Andrew Scheer accused Trudeau of "wining and dining" with an attempted murderer in a Thursday tweet. Atwal stated that he has a "friendly relationship" with Trudeau and that he "stayed away" from him to avoid embarrassment. On 8 March 2018, he apologized for the "embarrassment" he caused when he attended the event and told reporters that he took full responsibility for his past actions. A new committee of reporters and senators delivered its first classified report regarding the affair with 18 findings and 6 recommendations concerning allegations of foreign interference in Canadian political affairs.

=== Death threats against a British Columbia host ===
On 25 April 2018, Atwal was arrested at his home and charged for making threats to a local British Columbia host. According to documents, he faces charges for "uttering threats to cause death or bodily harm". His lawyer Marvin Stern stated that he made threats outside a Punjabi radio station in the Vancouver suburb of Surrey, British Columbia. The day after his arrest, he made an appearance in provincial court, but was released without cash or surety. He is expected to face trial on 7 June and appear at the Surrey Provincial Court to plead not guilty.

== Involvement in Canadian politics ==
In 2012, Atwal was invited to a budget speech of 35th Premier of British Columbia Christy Clark as a guest. In addition, he backed her leadership and was among supporters who accorded her a welcome in Surrey. His presence in the legislature caused embarrassment and a complaint was made to the speaker. Clark's reaction was similar to Wai Young when she received help from Ripudaman Singh Malik, who was acquitted in the Air India Flight 182 bombing. Clark insisted that she didn't know who Atwal was, even though he was invited to her budget speech and shook her hand. After the controversy, liberal party director Tariq Ghuman resigned. Atwal was also a member of the Surrey Fleetwood-Port Kells Liberal riding association of the Federal Liberal Party. In a 14 January 2013 post on Facebook, Atwal was seen in a photo with a young Justin Trudeau. Atwal is a long-time supporter of the Liberal Party and a former donor to the federal gifts with deep ties to the party that pre-date Trudeau's tenure as prime minister. Official records showed that he donated $500 to the Liberal Party on 9 April 2011. In May 2015, the Toronto Sun obtained two photos of him with Trudeau, with one at a campaign event in Vancouver and another one outside a house or restraint. He was also seen taking pictures with former liberal leader Michael Ignatieff and interim leader Bob Rae.
