= Rau Karna =

- Village
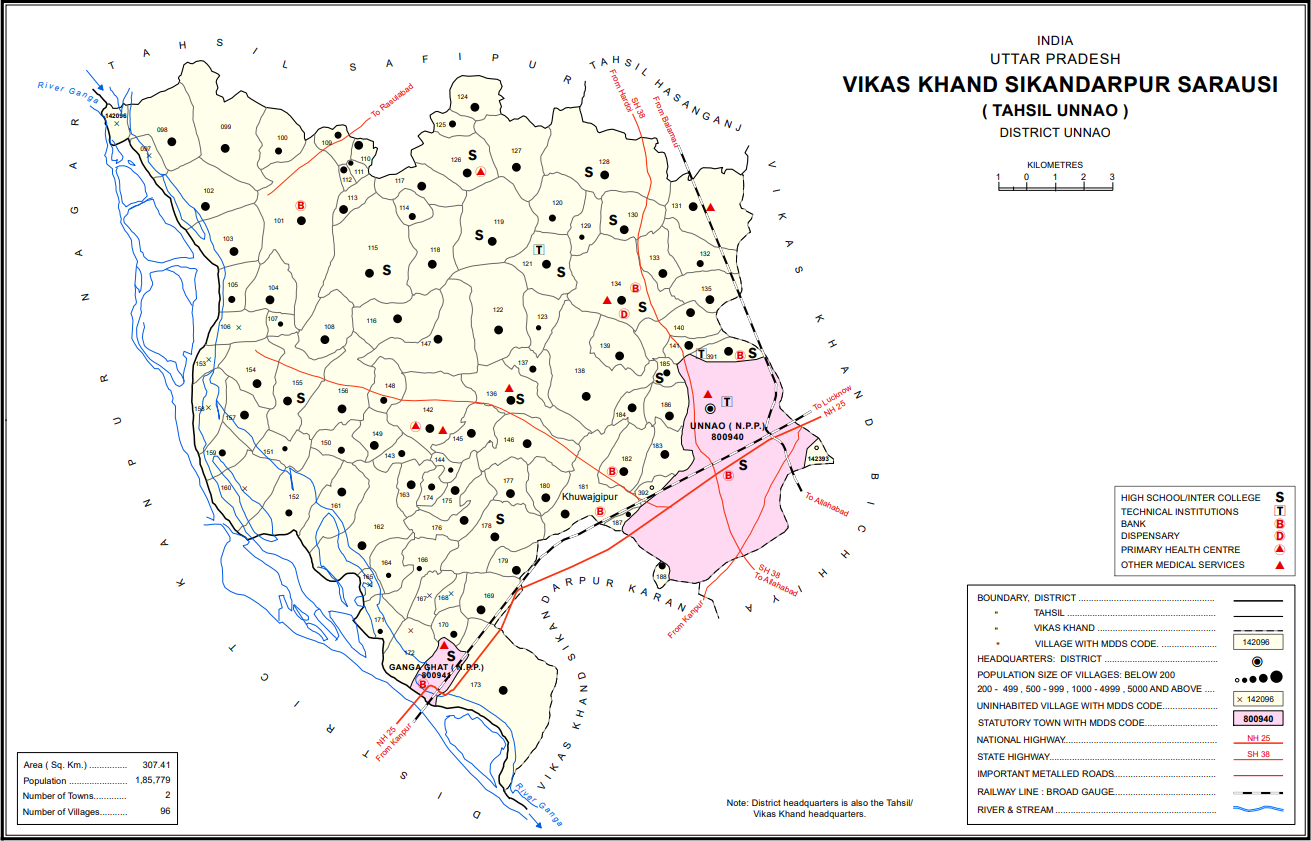
- Map showing Rau Karna (#128) in Sikandarpur Sarausi CD block

- Location in Uttar Pradesh, India
- Coordinates: 26°38′N 80°28′E
- Country India: India
- State: Uttar Pradesh
- District: Unnao

Area
  - Total: 10.772 km^{2} (4.159 sq mi)

Population (2011)
  - Total: 8,705
  - Density: 808.1/km^{2} (2,093/sq mi)

Languages
  - Official: Hindi
- Time zone: UTC+5:30 (IST)
- Vehicle registration: UP-35

Rau Karna is a village in Sikandarpur Sarausi block of Unnao district, Uttar Pradesh, India. It is located 11 km north of the city of Unnao, on the road to Hardoi. On the east side of the village is the Tinai, a small stream that dries up in hot weather. The village holds a market twice per week. Rau Karna is part of the nyaya panchayat circle of Banda Khera.

As of 2011, Rau Karna's population is 8,705 people, in 1,688 households. The main crops grown here are wheat, barley, gram, and jowar, and irrigation is provided by a canal as well as by tube wells. There are also some mahua and mango groves. The land around the village is level, and the soil is mostly fertile loam. On the north side of the village, there is a large banyan tree underneath which is a lingam "of great antiquity" dedicated to Mahadeo.

== History ==
Rau Karna is said to have been founded around the year 1125 by Rawan Singh, who was the son of a Bisen thakur named Unwant Singh. Rawan Singh cleared the land and founded the settlement, which is named after him ("Rau" being a modified version of "Rawan"). The modern village and nearby mounds mark the site of the fort built by Rawan Singh. Much later, his descendants Bhawal Sah and Narbir Sah served as generals under the Mughal emperor Aurangzeb.

At the turn of the 20th century, Rau Karna had a population of 2,532, almost entirely Hindus and mostly belonging to the Pasi and Lodh castes. The village did not have a school, so children attended the one in nearby Thana instead.
