= Malkiat Singh Sidhu =

Indian politician

Malkiat Singh Sidhu (died 27 April 1991) was the former Planning Minister of Punjab, India. He was a member of the Akali Dal political party. In 1986, he was named Minister of State.

On 25 May 1986, he was ambushed by four Sikhs who had learnt that he was visiting Canada on a private matter and was shot. Although he survived the assassination attempt, he was killed five years later at his home in India.

== Assassination Attempt ==
Sidhu entered Canada to attend his nephew's wedding; although his entrance was not noted by Canadian authorities, Sikh extremists learned of the trip through "the efficiency of the Sikh intelligence network". It was later determined that "clear information on the pending attempt on his life" had been given to Canadian authorities two days prior, but the information was not passed on to the appropriate agency over the weekend. By the time it was received on the Monday, the attack had already taken place.

While driving on an isolated gravel road near Gold River on Vancouver Island with three other people, Sidhu's car was forced to stop when another vehicle stopped in front of them. The occupants exited their vehicle and began smashing Sidhu's car with hammers, firing five .32-calibre bullets into the car, striking Sidhu in the arm and chest. Sidhu feigned death, and the men ran back to their vehicle.

Shortly afterward, Jasbir Singh Atwal, Jaspal Singh Atwal, Armajit Singh Dhindsa and Sukhdial Singh Gill were arrested at a police roadblock. In February 1987, all four men were convicted and sentenced to 20 years' imprisonment.

In September 1987, their convictions were overturned when Michael Code, showed that the wiretap evidence against the four attackers had been obtained on a fraudulent warrant by the Canadian Security Intelligence Service (CSIS), who had provided a judge with faulty evidence from a source known to be untrustworthy. CSIS director Ted Finn resigned shortly after it was revealed that the CSIS affidavits were riddled with errors. However a government appeal upheld their convictions and sentences in June 1990.

== Murder ==
Sidhu was one of five Indian politicians running for office who were killed in 1991, gunned down along with his bodyguard by militants on 27 April while walking from his house in Moga to visit a friend.

== See also ==
- List of assassinated Indian politicians
- List of people who survived assassination attempts
