= Balbir Madhopuri =

Indian Punjabi language writer (born 1955)

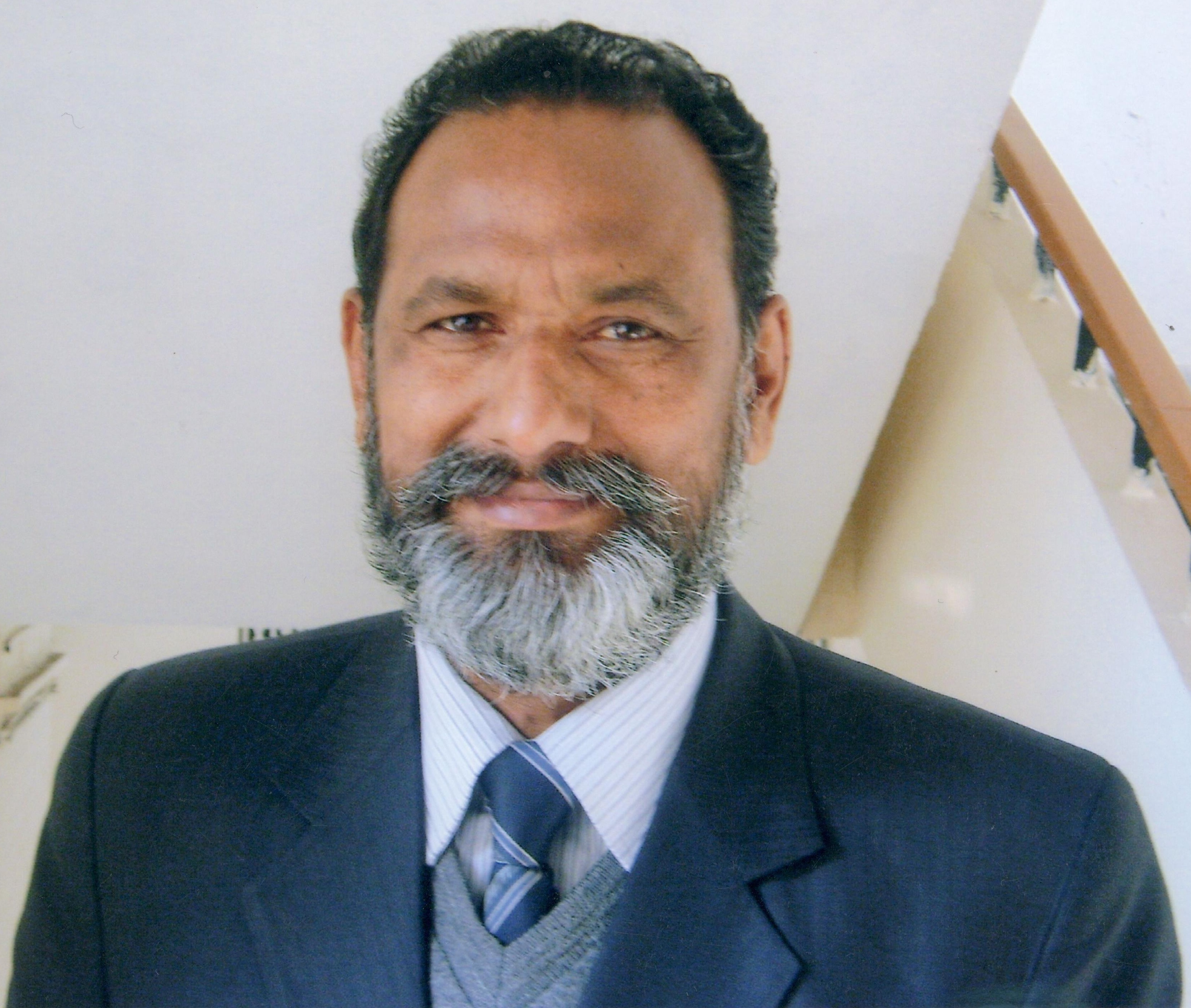
- Balbir Madhopuri in 2021
- Born: 24 July 1955 (age 71); Jalandhar, Punjab, India
- Education: Guru Nanak Dev University
- Occupations: Writer, Translator and Poet
- Spouse: Harjinder Kaur
- Children: Two daughters and one son
- Writing career
- Language: Punjabi
- Notable work: Chhangiya Rukh (autobiography)
- Notable awards: The Dhahan Prize in 2021 for novel "Mitti Bol Payi"; Sahitya Academy Award for Translation in 2013 for Raj Kamal Chaudhary Dian Chonvian Khananiyan
- Website: www.balbirmadhopuri.in

Balbir Madhopuri is a Punjabi language writer, poet and translator. He is best known for his autobiography, Chhangiya Rukh. His writings are primarily focused on the issues related to the oppressed and depressed classes, especially Dalits. In 2021, He has received The Dhahan Prize for Punjabi Literature for his novel Mitti Bol Payi.

== Birth and writings ==
Balbir Madhopuri was born in 1955 in Madhopur, a small village in district Jalandhar, Punjab. He worked as a child labourer and an agricultural worker at his early age. Despite a humble beginning, he managed to acquire a post-graduate degree in Punjabi. Madhopuri is a Punjabi poet with three collections of poetry. His autobiography is Chhangiya Rukh which was written by him in Punjabi. Changiya Rukh (Against the Night) by Oxford University Press in 2010 has also been published in some Indian languages including Hindi and Shahmukhi (in Pakistan in 2010). In 2021, Chhangiya Rukh has been translated in Urdu by Ajmal Kamal.
Madhopuri has authored 14 books in his mother tongue. Apart from his original works he has translated two and thirty into Punjabi from Hindi and English. He has also edited 40 books in Punjabi. He wrote research papers on Ghadar Movement, Revolutionaries, Naxal poet Pash, Dalit Movements in Punjab and India etc. have been published and included in the books edited by different scholars.

Balbir Madhopuri is working as Director and Editor of Samkali Sahit (a quarterly reputed literary magazine) with Punjabi Sahit Sabha (Regd.), New Delhi.

== Selected works ==
=== Original main works ===
1. Maroothal da Birkh (1992)
2. BhakhdaPatal (1998)
3. Meri Chonvi Kavita (2011)
4. Chhangiya Rukh (autobiography) (2002)
5. Ad Dharm de Bani-Ghadri Baba Mangu Ram (2010)
6. Sahitak Mulakatan(1995)
7. Samunder de Sang Sang (A travelogue-1996)
8. Dilli Ik Virasat (1998)
9. Mitti Bol Payi (winner - 2021 The Dhahan Prize in novel category)

=== Translated main works ===
1. Lajja (1996)
2. Edwina and Nehru (1997)
3. Shahidan de Khat (1998 )
4. Krantikarian da Bachpan (1999)
5. Neeli Jheel (1999)
6. Diabetes de Sang Jeen Da Dhang (2002)
7. Manukh di Kahani (2001)
8. Natakan de Desh Vich(1996)
9. BhartdianPuranianYadgaaran(1999)
10. Samunder de Tapu (1994)
11. Man di Dunia (2004)
12. Guru Ravidas di Mool Vichardhara (2004)
13. Nawab Rangile (2004)
14. Karantikari Azeemula Khan (2009)
15. Rajkamal Choudhary Dian Chonvian Kahania (2010)
16. My Childhood on My Shoulders (autobiography of Prof. Sheoraj Singh Bechain -2012)
17. Subhash Neeravdian Chonvian Kahanian (2013)
18. Inni Kaur's Guru Nanak–Sakhian (2014)
19. Mitti Boldi Hai (Kahaniyan) (2015)
20. Chonvia Afriki Kahania (2015)
21. Lu Xundian Chonvian Kahanian (2017)

=== Edited main works ===
1. Bharti Vigyan De Chanan Munare
2. Satguru Ram Singh Te Kuka Lehar
3. Guru Nanak Ton Guru Granth Sahib Tak
4. Shahidan De Khat
5. Bhagat Singh : Amar Vidrohi
6. Shaheed Kartar Singh Sarabha
7. Dyal Singh Majithia
8. Bharat Dian Puranian Yadgaaran
9. Bharat Chhado Andolan
10. Bharti Sabhyachar Di Jhaki
11. Bharat VichAngrezi Raj (Part-I)
12. Bharat Vich Angrezi Raj (Part-II)
13. Bharat Dian Lok Kathavan
14. Punjab De Lok Nach
15. Bharat De Lok Nach
16. Kalpna Chawla
17. Bharat De Gaurav Granth
18. 1857 Da Sutantarta Sangram
19. Vigyanian Dian Jeevan Kathavan
20. Bharat De Panshi
21. Ravinder Nath Thakur Dian Bal Kahanian
22. Bhapa Pritam Singh Yadgari Bhashan
23. Punjabi Swaijivinia: Sahitk Mulankan

== Awards and honours ==
His works have earned him some awards including -

1. The Dhahan Prize in 2021 for his novel Mitti Bol Payi.
2. Lifetime Achievement Award - 2013, Punjabi Academy, Delhi
3. Former Prime Minister, Dr. Manmohan Singh honoured him in International Punjabi Conference - Delhi in 2.2.2018
4. Sahitya Akademi Translation Prize 2013
5. Best Book (Chhangiya Rukh) of the year-2003, Punjab Languages Department, Govt. of Punjab
6. S.M.S. Sahitya Award, Maharashtra - 2003
7. Also honoured by the Department of Punjabi, Kurukshetra University, Department of Hindi, University of Ranchi etc.
8. Translation Prize in 2000 from Punjabi Academy, Delhi
9. Kav Purskar (1994)
10. Sant Ram Udasi Memorial Award - 1993 (Barnala, Punjab)

== The Dhahan Prize 2021 ==
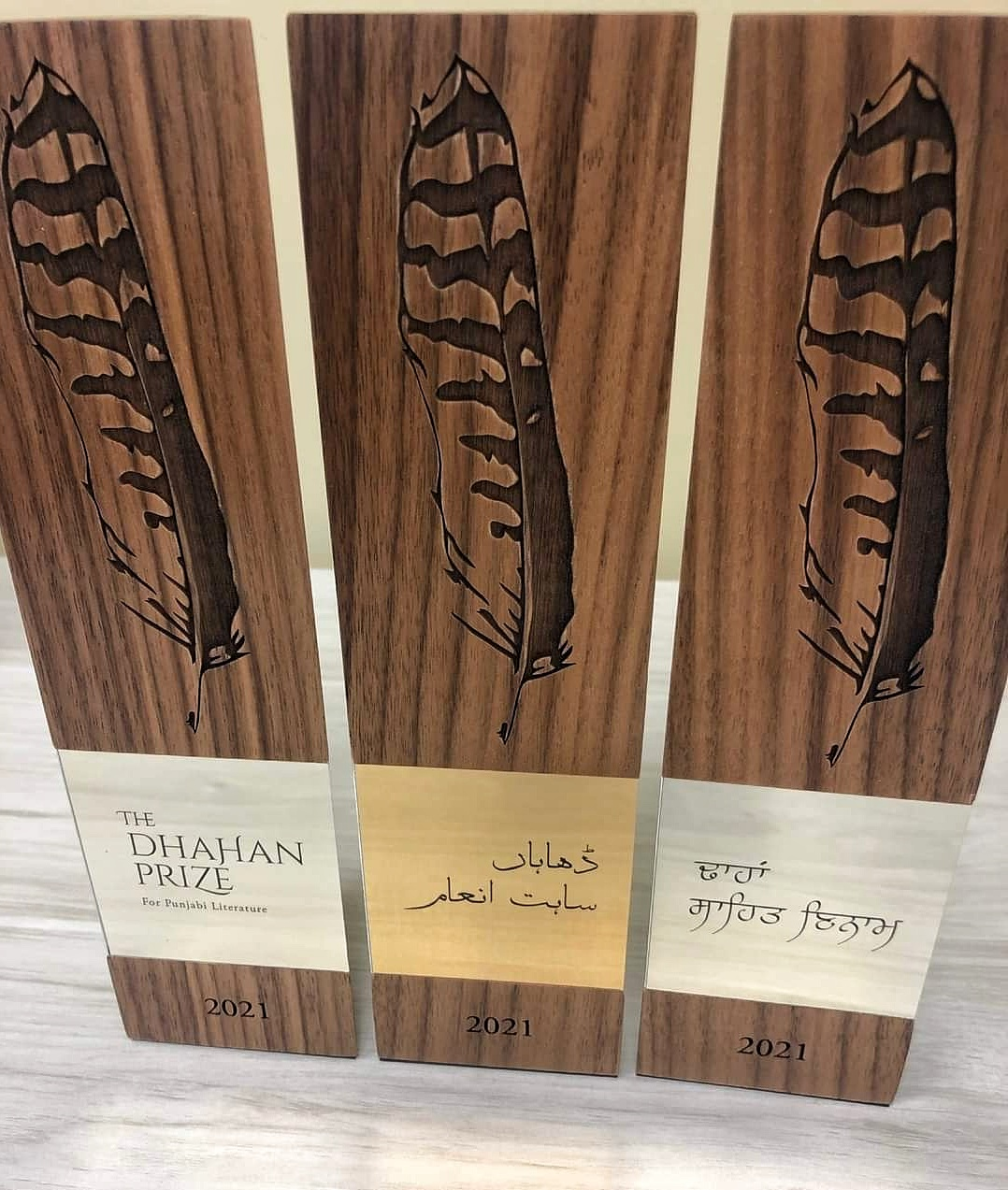
The Dhahan Prize 2021

The Dhahan Prize is an annual prize awarded by the Canada-India education society for excellence in Punjabi fiction. The prize is given to three books of fiction, written in either Gurmukhi or Shahmukhi script (Punjabi). In 2021, Balbir Madhopuri’s Mitti Bol Payi has received The Dhahan Prize for Punjabi Literature in the novel category. Mitti Bol Paye deals with the historic inequality and mistreatment of the lower castes, women, the landless poor, and those denied access to education by powerful landlords and higher castes. In November 2022, Madhopuri had three lecture series in different cities of Canada as the recipient of this award.
