= The Dhahan Prize =

The Dhahan Prize is an annual prize awarded by Canada-India education society for excellence in Punjabi fiction. The prize is given to three books of fiction, written in either Gurmukhi or Shahmukhi script of Punjabi. The prize is named after Canadian Punjabi businessman, Barj Singh Dhahan.

== 2014 winners ==
- Avtar Singh Billing for Khali Khoohaan di Katha - Winner
- Jasbir Bhullar for Ek Raat Da Samundar - Runner-up
- Zubair Ahmed for Kabutar, Banaire Te Galian - Runner-up

== 2015 winners ==
- Darshan Singh for Lota - Winner
- Harjeet Atwal for Mor Udaari - Runner-up
- Nain Sukh for Madho Lal Hussain - Lahore Di Vel - Runner-up

== 2016 winners ==
- Jarnail Singh for Kaale Varke - Winner
- Zahid Hassan for Tassi Dharti - Runner-up
- Simran Dhaliwal for Us Pal - Runner-up

== 2017 winners ==
- Pargat Singh Satauj for Khabar Ik Pind Di - Winner
- Ali Anwar Ahmed for Filthy Chador - Runner-up
- Nachhattar Singh Brar for Paper Marriage - Runner-up

== 2018 winners ==
- Baldev Singh Sadaknama for Sooraj Di Akh - Winner
- Harpreet Sekha for Prism - Runner-up
- Nasir Abbas Baloch for Jhootha Sacha Koi Na - Runner-up

== 2019 winners ==
- Jatinder Singh Haans for Jyona Sach Baki Jhooth - Winner
- Gurdev Singh Rupana for Aam Khas - Runner-up
- Mudassar Bashir for Kaun - Runner-up

== 2020 winners ==
- Kesra Ram for Zanani Paud - Winner
- Harkirat Kaur Chahal for Aadem-Grehen - Runner-up
- Zubair Ahmed for Panni Di Kandh - Runner-up

== 2021 winners ==
- Nain Sukh for Jogi, Sap, Trah (Short Stories) - Winner
- Balbir Madhopuri for Mitti Bol Peye (Novel) - Runner-up
- Sarghi Jammu for Apne Apne Marseia (Short Stories) - Runner-up
