= Anokharwal =

- Village
- Location in Punjab, India Anokharwal (India)
- Coordinates: 31.2235843°N 75.8474704°E
- Country: India
- State: Punjab
- District: Shaheed Bhagat Singh Nagar

Government
  - Type: Panchayat raj
  - Body: Gram panchayat
- Elevation: 254 m (833 ft)

Population (2011)
  - Total: 524
- Sex ratio 276/248 ♂/♀

Languages
  - Official: Punjabi
- Time zone: UTC+5:30 (IST)
- PIN: 144505
- Telephone code: 01823
- ISO 3166 code: IN-PB
- Post office: Banga
- Website: nawanshahr.nic.in

Anokharwal is a village in Shaheed Bhagat Singh Nagar district of Punjab State, India. It is located 13 kilometres (8.1 mi) away from postal head office Banga, 16 kilometres (9.9 mi) from Phagwara, 27 kilometres (17 mi) from district headquarter Shaheed Bhagat Singh Nagar and 117 kilometres (73 mi) from state capital Chandigarh. The village is administrated by Sarpanch an elected representative of the village.

== Demography ==
As of 2011, Anokharwal has a total number of 112 houses and a population of 524 of which 276 include are males while 248 are females according to the report published by Census India in 2011. The literacy rate of Anokharwal is 80.54%, higher than the state average of 75.84%. The population of children under the age of 6 years is 46 which is 8.78% of total population of Anokharwal, and child sex ratio is approximately 484 as compared to Punjab state average of 846.

Most of the people are from Schedule Caste which constitutes 48.47% of total population in Anokharwal. The town does not have any Schedule Tribe population so far.

As per the report published by Census India in 2011, 158 people were engaged in work activities out of the total population of Anokharwal which includes 149 males and 9 females. According to census survey report 2011, 99.37% workers describe their work as main work and 0.63% workers are involved in Marginal activity providing livelihood for less than 6 months.

== Education ==
The village has a Punjabi medium, co-ed primary school founded in 1953. The schools provide mid-day meal as per Indian Midday Meal Scheme. The school provide free education to children between the ages of 6 and 14 as per Right of Children to Free and Compulsory Education Act.

Amardeep Singh Shergill Memorial college Mukandpur and Sikh National College Banga are the nearest colleges. Lovely Professional University is 24 kilometres (15 mi) away from the village.

== Transport ==
Banga railway station is the nearest train station however, Phagwara Junction railway station is 17 kilometres (11 mi) away from the village. Sahnewal Airport is the nearest domestic airport which located 71 kilometres (44 mi) away in Ludhiana and the nearest international airport is located in Chandigarh also Sri Guru Ram Dass Jee International Airport is the second nearest airport which is 133 kilometres (83 mi) away in Amritsar.

== See also ==
- List of villages in India
