= Tanesha Awasthi =

American blogger

Tanesha Awasthi (born March 4, 1981) is an influential fashion blogger, designer, and advocate for body positivity. She is best known for her fashion blog, Girl With Curves.

Awasthi has become a leading figure in the "curvy blog" movement, where she has gained recognition for her commitment to celebrating diverse body types. She has been featured in many notable magazines discussing her views on both style and self-acceptance, and sharing advice on style tips for all body sizes.

== Career ==
Awasthi started Girl With Curves in 2011 while working in the tech field in order to share her style tips and express her passion for fashion. She posted images of her outfits to her blog every day. She identifies her blog as a member of the "curvy community." She often speaks of her blog as a platform for self-assurance and body confidence.

In November 2013, Awasthi began designing clothing. Her first design was a tutu. Her plus-size fashion collection line features peplum tops, skinny jeans, crop tops, and skirts.

Awasthi partnered with Pandora Jewelry in 2014 in order to showcase their Autumn/Winter collection. She completed a meet-and-greet with shoppers at an event at the Westfield Valley Fair on October 18, 2014.

== Awards ==
Awasthi won the Curvy Blog Awards in 2012. The Curvy Blog Awards are an annual competition created by luxury fashion retailer Navabi. This award was decided by a public vote and a panel of three judges: fashion designer Anna Scholz, model Fluvia Lacerda, and Editor of Vogue Curvy Elisa D'Ospina. Awasthi was flown out to England where she was featured in Britain's Plus Fashion Week.

Awasthi also won the award in 2014 for Favorite Bay Area Fashion blogger, presented by the San Francisco-based site Racked SF.
