= Atti =

Atti may refer to:

- Atti, Jalandhar, a village in Punjab, India
- Atti, a 2016 Tamil film
- Atti Aboyni (1946), Hungarian-born Australian soccer player and manager
- Isotta degli Atti (1433–1474), Italian noble and regent
- Atti family, lords of Sassoferrato, Italy, in the 13th–15th centuries
