= Harjeet Atwal =

British Punjabi writer (born 1952)

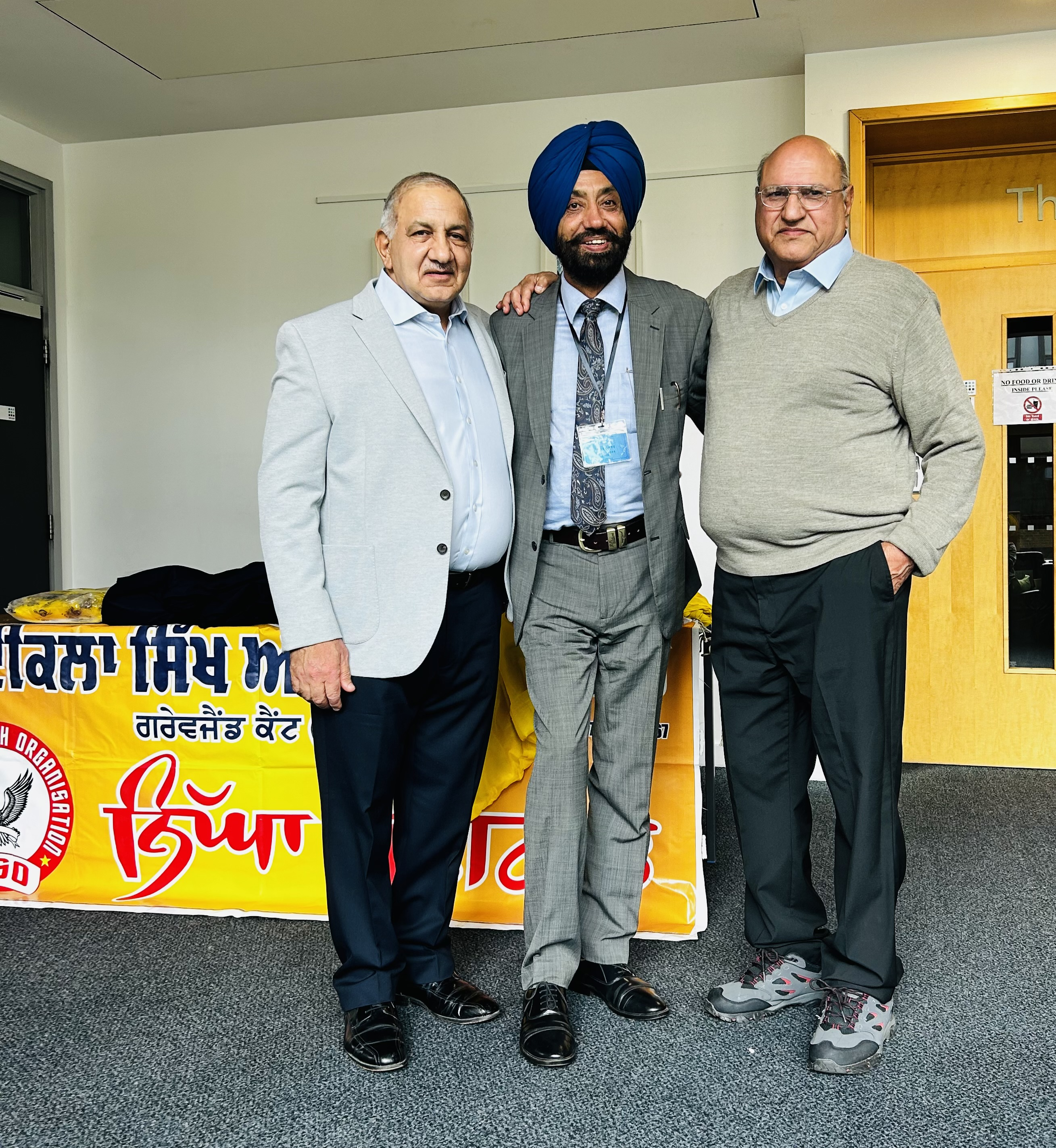
- Punjabi writers Harjeet Atwal, Harvinder Singh and Surinder Sihra.
- Born: September 8, 1952 (age 73); Nawanshahar, India
- Occupations: Writer, novelist, storyteller
- Known for: Literature

Harjeet Atwal (Punjabi: ਹਾਰਜੀਤ ਅਤਵਾਲ, born 8 August 1952) is a British Punjabi writer and novelist. He has written more than 20 books and he is also the editor of Punjabi magazine Shabad. He is also known as a storyteller and poet. Now he lives in London with his wife and three children. He received a runner-up Dhahan Prize for his novel Mor Udari in 2015.

== Early life ==
Atwal was born on 8 September 1952 in the village of Pharala, in Jallandhar district (now Nawanshahar) in Punjab, India. His father was Darshan Singh and his mother was Balbir Kaur. He is eldest brother of three sisters and a late brother.

He got his secondary education from Govt. High School Pharala, and graduated from Sikh National College, Banga. After his degree in law he started his legal practice in Nawanshahar courts but he migrated to the United Kingdom in July, 1977. He lives in London; he has three adult children – two daughters and a son.

He was interested in literature since childhood and started writing short stories and poems in his school days.

== Writing career ==
=== Work ===
Harjeet Atwal has written more than two dozens of books which includes novels, poetry, short stories, biography, travelogue, essays and articles, literary analytical articles, editing the books, editing the magazines etc. His work is also available in other languages like Hindi, English and other Indian languages. He has been writing columns for few daily newspapers and magazine as well. He, regularly, delivers his lectures on the concerns about modern literature in Indian universities and other educational institutions. He is President of 'Adara Shabad' which is a Punjabi writers association based in London and Chandigarh. Here are main books written by Harjeet Atwal

- 'Sard Pairan di udik' (A wait with naked feet). a collection of poems.
- 'Suka Pata Te Hawa', (A dead leaf in wind) a collection of short stories.
- 'Kala lahu', (Black blood). a collection of short stories.
- 'Sapan Da Bhar Bartainia', (Britain, full of snakes) a collection of short stories.
- 'Khuh Wala Ghar', (A house with well). a collection of short stories.
- 'Ik Sach Mera Vi', (One truth from me). a collection of short stories.
- 'Nawen Geet Da Mukhra', (First stanza of new song). a collection of short stories.
- 'Ik Gal Je Dil Lage, (a matter if you feel right) a collection of short stories.
- 'Das Darvaze', (Ten doors) a collection of short stories.
- 'Focus', (The focus). a travelogue.
- 'Pachasi Variyan Da Jashan', (The celebration of 85 years) a biography of his father Mr Darshan Singh.
- 'One Way', a novel.
- 'Ret', (The sands) a novel.
- 'Swari', (The passenger) a novel.
- Southall, a novel.
- 'British Born Desi', (Indians born in Britain). a novel.
- 'Akal Sahai', (God helps) a historical novel
- 'Aapana' (My own). a historical novel.
- 'Geet', (The song). a novel.
- 'Mudri Dot Com', (mundri.com) a novel.
- 'Mor udari', (A flight of peacock) a novel.
- 'Kale rang gulaban de', (Black roses), a novel.
- 'Jetthu', (a name). This novel was advertised as name Shalmai
- 'A Collection of Diasporas Punjabi Short Stories', an edited book. And he has edited few more books.

He is co-editor of tri-monthly Punjabi magazine named 'Shabad' (The word) He has done lot of translation work as well.
