= Dhak Khalwara =

- Village
- Location in Punjab, India Dhak Khalwara (India)
- Coordinates: 31.242866°N 75.809451°E
- Country: India
- State: Punjab
- District: Kapurthala

Government
  - Type: Panchayati raj (India)
  - Body: Gram panchayat

Population (2011)
  - Total: 1,011
- Sex ratio 510/501♂/♀

Languages
  - Official: Punjabi
  - Other spoken: Hindi
- Time zone: UTC+5:30 (IST)
- PIN: 144401
- Telephone code: 01822
- ISO 3166 code: IN-PB
- Vehicle registration: PB-09
- Website: kapurthala.gov.in

Dhak Khalwara is a village in Phagwara Tehsil in Kapurthala district of Punjab State, India. It is located 43 kilometres (27 mi) from Kapurthala, 3 kilometres (1.9 mi) from Phagwara. The village is administrated by a Sarpanch, who is an elected representative.

== Demography ==
According to the report published by Census India in 2011, Dhak Khalwara has 188 houses with the total population of 1,011 persons of which 510 are male and 501 females. Literacy rate of Dhak Khalwara is 76.48%, higher than the state average of 75.84%. The population of children in the age group 0–6 years is 135 which is 13.35% of the total population. Child sex ratio is approximately 824, lower than the state average of 846.

As per census 2011, 289 people were engaged in work activities out of the total population of Dhak Khalwara which includes 269 males and 20 females. According to census survey report 2011, 93.43% workers (Employment or Earning more than 6 Months) describe their work as main work and 6.57% workers are involved in Marginal activity providing livelihood for less than 6 months.

== Population data ==
Particulars	Total	Male	Female
Total No. of Houses	188	-	-
Population	1,011	510	501
Child (0-6)	135	74	61
Schedule Caste	612	310	302
Schedule Tribe	0	0	0
Literacy	76.48 %	83.26 %	69.77 %
Total Workers	289	269	20
Main Worker	270	0	0
Marginal Worker	19	13	6

== Caste ==
The village has schedule caste (SC) constitutes 60.53% of total population of the village and it doesn't have any Schedule Tribe (ST) population.
