= Sikandarpur, Sikandarpur Sarausi =

Sikandarpur
- Village
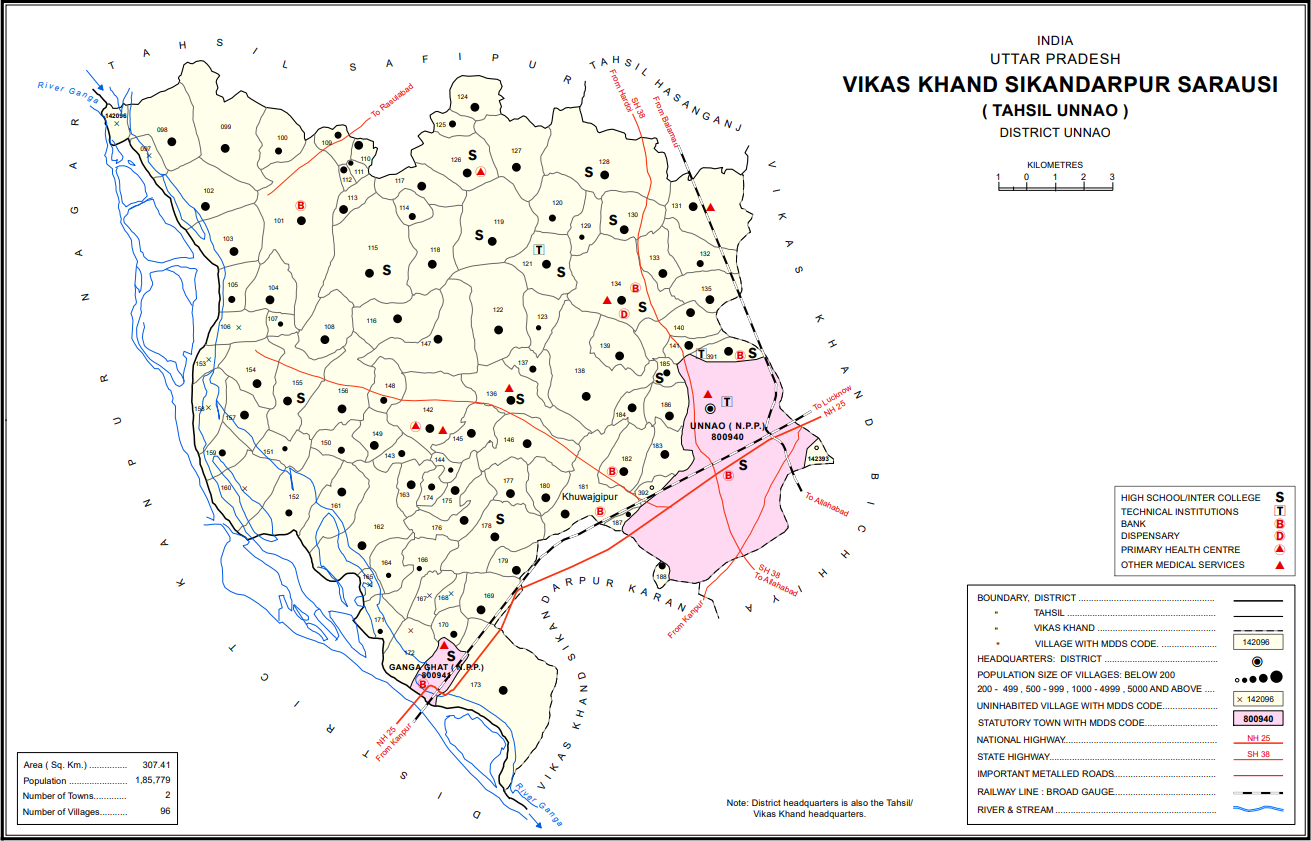
- Map showing Sikandarpur (#142) in Sikandarpur Sarausi CD block

- Location in Uttar Pradesh, India
- Coordinates: 26°34′N 80°23′E
- Country India: India
- State: Uttar Pradesh
- District: Unnao

Area
  - Total: 5.579 km^{2} (2.154 sq mi)

Population (2011)
  - Total: 4,510
  - Density: 808/km^{2} (2,090/sq mi)

Languages
  - Official: Hindi
- Time zone: UTC+5:30 (IST)
- Vehicle registration: UP-35

Sikandarpur is a village in Sikandarpur Sarausi block of Unnao district, Uttar Pradesh, India. Located 10 km northwest of the city of Unnao, near the Barkota lake, it serves as the block headquarters as well as the seat of a nyaya panchayat. It is also the namesake of a historical pargana. The main crops in Sikandarpur are wheat, barley, gram, juwar, and paddy, and irrigation is largely done by wells. It has a post office and a veterinary hospital. As of 2011, its population is 4,510, in 752 households.

== History ==
Sikandarpur was originally called Burhanpur, but the name was changed in 1297 by Sikandar Khan, an agent of Ala-ud-Din Khilji. It later lent its name to a pargana, previously named after the neighbouring village of Sarosi; C.A. Elliott wrote in 1862 that the name change had "recently become habitual" at the time.

At the turn of the 20th century, Sikandarpur was described as one of the main villages in its namesake pargana. It had a lower primary school and a temple to Mahadeo, and its population as of 1901 was 1,727, including a Muslim minority of 263. Brahmins were the most numerous caste at the time.

== Sikandarpur Today ==
This village today comprises a tempo stand called Sikandarpur Tempo Stand alongside a fresh vegetable and fruit market called Sikandarpur Bazaar, which settles every wednesday and saturday. Two government schools, a hospital, three mosques and many temples are its very landscapes.The area of the village is mainly divided in six parts or settlements namely Katra (market part), Awasthiane (Awasthi-majority part), Musalmanyani (Muslim-majority part), Shuklayan (Shukla-majority part) Ahirane (Yadav-Majority part) and Ramnagariya (Pal- majority part). To its very near are three type of fields for farmers- 1.the Bagiya of Shuklayan and Ahirane and Ramnagariya(शुक्लयान, अहिराने और रामनगरिया की बगिया), 2.the Terrain of Barkota jheel(बरकोटा झील की तराई)and 3.the Uncha land(ऊंचा ज़मीन).
