= Awasthi =

Awasthi is a surname found among Kanyakubja Brahmins of Kannauj, deriving from the name of the Vedic sage Agastya.

Notable people who bear it include:

- Dharani Dhar Awasthi (1922–2011), Indian botanist and lichenologist
- Malini Awasthi (b. 1967), Indian folk singer
- Pankhuri Awasthy (b. 1991), Indian actress
- Prashant Awasthi (cricketer) (b. 1990), Indian first-class cricketer
- Prashant Awasthi (footballer) (b. 1998), Nepalese footballer
- Sapna Awasthi, Indian playback singer
- Tanesha Awasthi (b. 1981), Indian fashion blogger
