= Dhak Pandori =

- Village
- Location in Punjab, India Dhak Pandori (India)
- Coordinates: 31.244°N 75.832°E
- Country: India
- State: Punjab
- District: Kapurthala

Languages
  - Official: Punjabi
- Time zone: UTC+5:30 (IST)
- PIN: 144401
- Telephone code: 01824
- Vehicle registration: PB 36

Dhak Pandori is a village in Kapurthala district in North India, in the central part of the Punjab. Dhak Pandori is a small village located in Phagwara Tehsil of Kapurthala district, Punjab with a total of 441 families residing. The Dhak Pandori village has population of 2439 of which 1297 are males while 1142 are females as per Population Census 2011.

In Dhak Pandori village population of children with age 0-6 is 249 which makes up 10.21% of total population of village. Average Sex Ratio of Dhak Pandori village is 880 which is lower than Punjab state average of 895. Child Sex Ratio for the Dhak Pandori as per census is 844, lower than Punjab average of 846.

Dhak Pandori village has lower literacy rate compared to Punjab. In 2011, literacy rate of Dhak Pandori village was 74.52% compared to 75.84% of Punjab. In Dhak Pandori Male literacy stands at 77.54% while female literacy rate was 71.11%.

As per constitution of India and Panchyati Raaj Act, Dhak Pandori village is administrated by Sarpanch (Head of Village) who is elected representative of village.

Caste Factor In Dhak Pandori village, most of the villagers are from Schedule Caste (SC). Schedule Caste (SC) constitutes 93.07% of total population in Dhak Pandori village. The village Dhak Pandori currently doesn’t have any Schedule Tribe (ST) population.

Work Profile In Dhak Pandori village out of total population, 808 were engaged in work activities. 83.79% of workers describe their work as Main Work (Employment or Earning more than 6 Months) while 16.21% were involved in Marginal activity providing livelihood for less than 6 months. Of 808 workers engaged in Main Work, 128 were cultivators (owner or co-owner) while 61 were Agricultural labourer.

Particulars Total Male Female Total No. of Houses 441 - - Population 2,439 1,297 1,142 Child (0-6) 249 135 114 Schedule Caste 2,270 1,213 1,057 Schedule Tribe 0 0 0 Literacy 74.52% 77.54% 71.11% Total Workers 808 752 56 Main Worker 677 0 0 Marginal Worker 131 0 0
