= Mangat Dhingrian =

Mangat Dingrian
- Village
- Location in Punjab, India Mangat Dingrian (India)
- Coordinates: 31.2652542°N 75.8678377°E
- Country: India
- State: Punjab
- District: Shaheed Bhagat Singh Nagar

Government
  - Type: Panchayat raj
  - Body: Gram panchayat
- Elevation: 251 m (823 ft)

Population (2011)
  - Total: 1,231
- Sex ratio 656/575 ♂/♀

Languages
  - Official: Punjabi
- Time zone: UTC+5:30 (IST)
- Telephone code: 01823
- ISO 3166 code: IN-PB
- Website: nawanshahr.nic.in

Mangat Dingrian is a village in Shaheed Bhagat Singh Nagar district of Punjab State, India. It is located 19 kilometres (12 mi) away from Banga, 13 kilometres (8.1 mi) from Phagwara, 33 kilometres (21 mi) from district headquarter Shaheed Bhagat Singh Nagar and 123 kilometres (76 mi) from state capital Chandigarh. The village is administrated by Sarpanch an elected representative of the village.

== Demography ==
As of 2011, Mangat Dhingrian has a total number of 251 houses and population of 1231 of which 656 include are males while 575 are females according to the report published by Census India in 2011. The literacy rate of Mangat Dhingrian is 81.72%, higher than the state average of 75.84%. The population of children under the age of 6 years is 115 which is 9.34% of total population of Mangat Dhingrian, and child sex ratio is approximately 1018 as compared to Punjab state average of 846.

Most of the people are from Schedule Caste which constitutes 53.94% of total population in Mangat Dhingrian. The town does not have any Schedule Tribe population so far.

As per the report published by Census India in 2011, 424 people were engaged in work activities out of the total population of Mangat Dhingrian which includes 376 males and 48 females. According to census survey report 2011, 83.49% workers describe their work as main work and 16.51% workers are involved in Marginal activity providing livelihood for less than 6 months.

== Education ==
The village has a Punjabi medium, co-ed primary school established in 1978. The school provide mid-day meal as per Indian Midday Meal Scheme. As per Right of Children to Free and Compulsory Education Act the school provide free education to children between the ages of 6 and 14. The village also has an privet un-aided Punjab medium, co-ed primary with upper primary and secondary/higher secondary school.

Amardeep Singh Shergill Memorial college Mukandpur and Sikh National College Banga are the nearest colleges. Industrial Training Institute for women (ITI Nawanshahr) is 33.8 kilometres (21.0 mi) The village is 80 kilometres (50 mi) from Indian Institute of Technology and 19.6 kilometres (12.2 mi) away from Lovely Professional University.

List of schools nearby:

- Govt Senior Secondary School, Ladhana Jhikka
- Dashmesh Model School, Kahma
- Govt High School, Jhander Kalan
- Govt Gigh School, Khan Khana
- Guru Ram Dass Public School, Cheta

== Transport ==
Banga train station is the nearest train station, however, Phagwara Junction railway station is 14 kilometres (8.7 mi) away from the village. Sahnewal Airport is the nearest domestic airport which located 64 kilometres (40 mi) away in Ludhiana and the nearest international airport is located in Chandigarh also Sri Guru Ram Dass Jee International Airport is the second nearest airport which is 128 kilometres (80 mi) away in Amritsar.

== See also ==
- List of villages in India
