= Khalwara =

- Village
- Location in Punjab, India Khalwara (India)
- Coordinates: 31.238972°N 75.809088°E
- Country: India
- State: Punjab
- District: Kapurthala

Government
  - Type: Panchayati raj (India)
  - Body: Gram panchayat

Population (2011)
  - Total: 1,920
- Sex ratio 974/946♂/♀

Languages
  - Official: Punjabi
  - Other spoken: Hindi
- Time zone: UTC+5:30 (IST)
- PIN: 144401
- Telephone code: 01822
- ISO 3166 code: IN-PB
- Vehicle registration: PB-09
- Website: kapurthala.gov.in

Khalwara is a village in Tehsil Phagwara, Kapurthala district, in Punjab, India. It is located 3 kilometres (1.9 mi) away from sub-district headquarter Phagwara and 43 km away from district headquarter Kapurthala and 127 kilometres (79 mi)from State capital Chandigarh. The village is administrated by a Sarpanch who is an elected representative of village as per the constitution of India and Panchayati raj (India).

== Transport ==
Phagwara Junction Railway Station and Mandhali Railway Station are the nearby railway stations to Khalwara, while Jalandhar City Rail Way station is 25 km away from the village. The village is 120 km away from Sri Guru Ram Dass Jee International Airport in Amritsar and another nearby airport is Sahnewal Airport in Ludhiana which is located 42 km away from the village.
