= Nijjar =

Nijjar is a surname found in India. Notable people with the surname include:

- Aron Nijjar (born 1994), English cricketer
- Rob Nijjar (born 1967), Canadian politician
- Sunny Singh Nijjar, Indian actor
- Surinder Singh Nijjar (1949–2021), Indian judge
- Hardeep Singh Nijjar (1977–2023), Canadian Sikh separatist leader
- Inderbir Singh Nijjar, Indian politician
