= Safipur =

Safipur Saipur
- Town
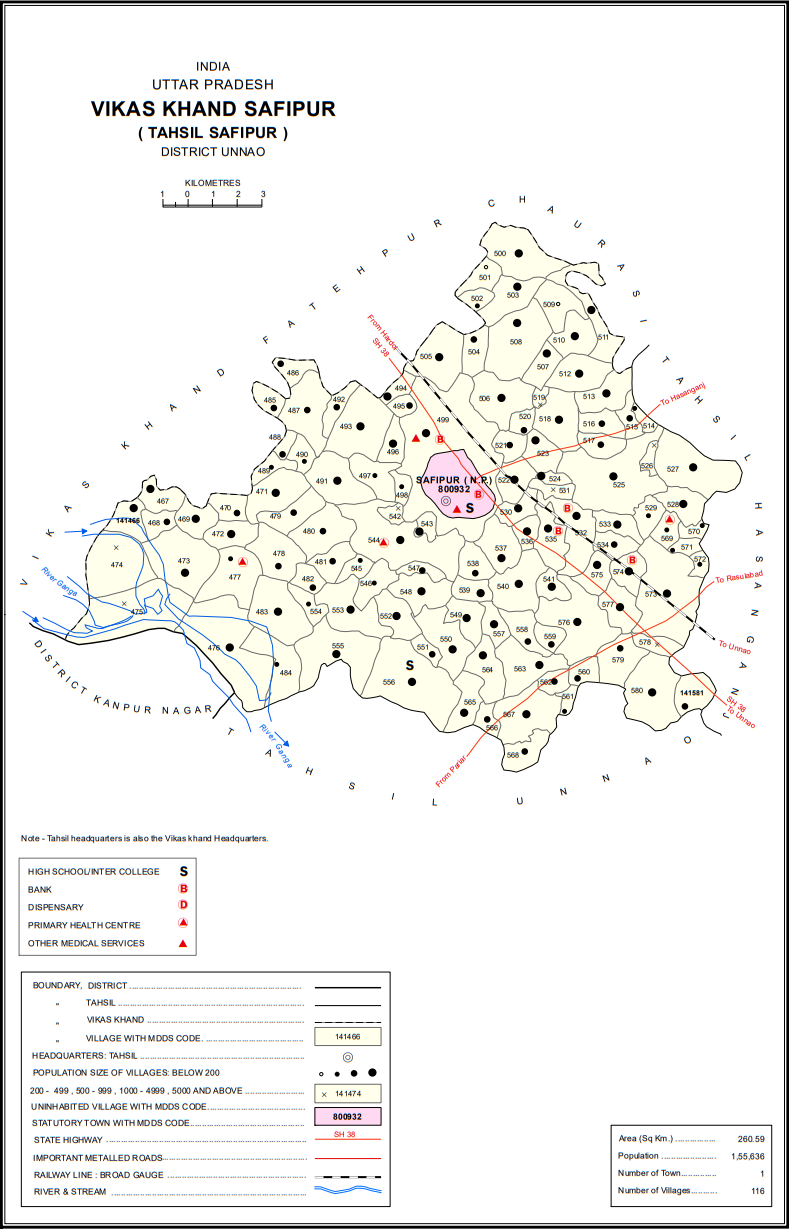
- Map of Safipur CD block

- Location in Uttar Pradesh, India
- Coordinates: 26.73°N 80.35°E
- Country India: India
- State: Uttar Pradesh
- District: Unnao
- Founder: Sai Sukul
- Named for: Makhdum Shah Safi

Area
  - Total: 8.5 km^{2} (3.3 sq mi)
- Elevation: 129 m (423 ft)

Population (2011)
  - Total: 25,688
  - Density: 3,000/km^{2} (7,800/sq mi)

Languages
  - Official: Hindi + Dehati
- Time zone: UTC+5:30 (IST)
- PIN: 209871
- Vehicle registration: UP-35

Safipur is a town and nagar panchayat in Unnao district in the Indian state of Uttar Pradesh. Located 27 km northwest of the city of Unnao, Safipur serves as a tehsil headquarters and is well-connected by roads to nearby towns. Founded in the 1300s and originally called Saipur, the town's present name of Safipur is in honour of the 16th-century Muslim saint Makhdum Shah Safi, whose dargah is located here.

Important commodities manufactured in Safipur today include steel boxes and almirahs, furniture, and incense sticks. As of 2011, Safipur's population is 25,688, in 4,288 households.

== History ==
Safipur was originally founded in the 1300s by a Brahmin named Sai Sukul, who was a subject of the Raja of Ugu. The town was formerly called Saipur in Sai Sukul's honour; the name Saipur was still the more common name in general use as late as the early 1900s. Sai Sukul supposedly died in battle in 1389 when Ibrahim Sharqi of the Jaunpur Sultanate conquered the town. Ibrahim then put his own lieutenants in charge of Saipur: Maulvi Akram, the ancestor of Makhdum Shah Safi; the paymaster Rao Mahesh Rao, whose descendants held the office of qanungo; the risaldar Sayyid Mir, whose descendants were zamindars; and Sayyid Hasan Reza, whose descendants were taluqdars and zamindars.

Maulvi Akram's great-grandson, Makhdum Shah Safi, was a religious mendicant who lived at Saipur during the 1500s. When he died, he was buried here, and the town's name was changed to Safipur in his honour. The mausoleum of Makhdum Shah Safi, as well as the surrounding dargah complex, was built by a follower of his named Chaudhri Khaslat Husain, who was the taluqdar of Sandila. A large mosque was added to the complex in the early 1900s by Chaudhri Muhammad Azim, who was also taluqdar of Sandila. Makhdum Shah Safi's dargah is the most important in Safipur, although there are several others, including those of Makhdoom Syed Baqa-Ullah shah (Founder of Silsila Baqaiyah) Ifhamullah Shah, Qudratullah Shah, Hafizullah Shah, and Abdullah Shah .

Safipur was mentioned as the capital of a pargana in the Ain-i-Akbari; it maintained this status into the 20th century.

Two high-ranking officials under the Nawabs of Awadh, Diwan Umed Rai and Maulvi Fazl Azim, were natives of Safipur. They both had various buildings constructed in the town: Diwan Umed Rai built a bazaar and a sarai, and Maulvi Fazl Azim built many wells, mosques, and an imambara.

At the turn of the 20th century, Safipur was described as "a flourishing, well-built town" with a daily standing market and bazaars held twice weekly in four muhallas. It contained the tehsil headquarters, a police station, a munsif's court, a dispensary, and a middle school attended by 146 students. Now the Safvi family is considered one of the last remaining descendants of the great maulvi and are very prominent in the area with Safvi Family Mujeeb safvi,Waris Safvi, Adil Safvi, Fazilat safvi, from mohalla Jami sarai/Baya Taalaab serving as the patriarch of the family and the custodian of the mausoleum.

== Demographics ==
Historical population
Year	Pop.	±%
1901	7,949	—
1911	7,365	−7.3%
1921	6,051	−17.8%
1931	6,283	+3.8%
1941	6,920	+10.1%
1951	6,792	−1.8%
1961	Not given	—
1971	Not given	—
1981	13,728	—
1991	16,951	+23.5%
2001	22,378	+32.0%
2011	25,688	+14.8%
Source: 2011 Census of India

According to the Indian census of 2001, Safipur had a population of 22,378. Males constitute 52% of the population and females 48%. In Safipur, 17% of the population is under 6 years of age.

According to the 2011 census, Safipur has a population of 25,688 people, in 4,288 households. The town's sex ratio is 932 females to every 1000 males; 13,299 of Safipur's residents are male and 12,389 are female. Among the 0-6 age group, the sex ratio is 940, which is higher than the district urban average. Members of Scheduled Castes make up 13.77% of the town's population, while no members of scheduled tribes were recorded. The town's literacy rate was 60.9% (counting only people age 7 and up); literacy was higher among men and boys (66.8%) than among women and girls (54.5%).

In terms of employment, 21.8% of Safipur residents were classified as main workers (i.e. people employed for at least 6 months per year) in 2011. Marginal workers (i.e. people employed for less than 6 months per year) made up 10.8%, and the remaining 67.4% were non-workers. Employment status varied heavily according to gender, with 51.2% of men being either main or marginal workers, compared to only 12.6% of women.

== Villages ==
Safipur CD block has the following 116 villages:

Village name	Total land area (hectares)	Population (in 2011)
Palhe Pur	172.1	1,061
Khusru Pur	112.5	1,892
Rania Mao	209.2	993
Mahapara Pur	219.8	1,195
Murha	108.6	536
Chhuhi	293.1	1,668
Ray Pur	162.3	1,188
Jamuniha Kachchh	432.2	2,137
Katri Aorangabad Istmurari	790	0
Katri Aorangabad Gair Istmurari	69.2	0
Rooppur Chandela Gair Ahatmali	387.9	1,267
Rooppur Chandela Ahatmali	151.9	438
Ram Pur	256	543
Daolatyar Pur	203.7	985
Katia Mao	295.4	697
Atwar Pur	157.6	501
Khairi Chandela	122.2	740
Dadlaha	840	3,608
Katri Alli Pur	359.6	276
Devria	99.7	599
Ram Pur Newada	247.3	810
Jujhar Pur	292.1	692
Papeer	71.3	504
Kisan Pur Tandawa	66.9	312
Andheliya	72	445
Sahapur	347.3	1,042
Devra Mao	110.4	590
Mao Mansur Pur	374.2	2,885
Kakraora	119.2	1,189
Safia Pur	79.3	914
Mahamud Pur	114	1,479
Gole Mao	197.7	204
Roshan Nagar	72.3	465
Safi Pur Rural	1,545.8	5,741
Munda	399.2	2,308
Tikara	94.5	108
Dayal Garhi	71.2	287
Gurdhari	288.1	1,238
Dakoli	155.1	638
Daroli	388.5	4,407
Pikhi	341.4	4,389
Atwa Mohal Osia	208.8	1,216
Osia	530.8	4,624
Habeeb Nagar	195.5	92
Raheema Bad	270.2	1,914
Raiya Mao	173.6	1,276
Mawae Lal	230.6	1,238
Birjpapl Pur	224.9	1,127
Lachhiman Ganj	31.1	376
Meer Nagar	112.1	680
Bhaishara	113.7	659
Nihal Pur	113.2	659
Mawe Man	264.8	1,818
Khijrabad	19.2	0
Dugaora	68.5	508
Abdulla Pur	78.1	702
Saleed	159.2	1,351
Gaori	120.2	1,021
Darab Nagar	78.8	1,032
Dev Gaon	706	4,386
Jahangeerabad	36.5	0
Khargaora	523.7	2,736
Lahber Pur	523.7	1,584
Najir Pur	104.1	317
Naobat Pur	113.3	1,532
Chakrasool Pur	14.8	0
Babhana	361.8	1,856
Makhdoom Nagar	158.6	1,449
Gopal Pur	108.1	751
Salhenagar Karaondi	240.4	2,668
Fateh Pur	105.2	1,077
Jat Purwa	202.8	1,869
Sahadat Nagar	119.9	816
Fajil Pur	103.9	1,472
Kusela	325.4	1,817
Sherpur Khurd	95.7	1,022
Loniahar	42.1	0
Sakhan Musalmanan	65.1	1,539
Sakhan Rajputan	744.4	2,889
Nibee Garha	106.4	257
Hamjapur	148.6	302
Gaholi	83.3	735
Sarai Sakhan	291.2	2,025
Devgan Mao	167	1,114
Mirja Pur	277.7	2,168
Niyamat Pur	40.7	973
Murad Pur	145.9	1,229
Ibraheema Bad	255.6	1,358
Khanpur	40.8	484
Jamalnagar Ahatmali	242.7	1,438
Jamalnagar Gair Ahatmali	756.8	4,425
Bahauddeen Pur	117.7	1,185
Narhar Pur	122.9	868
Bellawan	108.6	764
Aojhar Pur	97.2	515
Rukana Pur	59.8	471
Khokha Pur	75.6	764
Atha	281.2	2,671
Mustfa Bad	186.7	2,174
Salepur Khaeel Nagar	144.5	1,002
Hasana Pur	60	900
Pawa	413.8	2,447
Ray Pur	154.6	910
Jagdeesh Pur	120	457
Ambahara	74.3	458
Juned Pur	63.9	337
Ram Pur	82.5	398
Methi Tikur	799.8	6,848
Umer	171.9	1,147
Jamaluddeen Pur	167.4	1,786
Unwan	552.9	6,530
Atwa	202.1	1,804
Chakal Wanshi	72.3	0
Barbhaola	227.8	606
Firoj Pur Kala	379.7	2,147
Bhadni	185.6	895

== See also ==
- Salindh
