= Bharoli =

- Village
- Location in Punjab, India Bharoli (India)
- Coordinates: 31.2403431°N 75.8819353°E
- Country: India
- State: Punjab
- District: Shaheed Bhagat Singh Nagar

Government
  - Type: Panchayat raj
  - Body: Gram panchayat
- Elevation: 254 m (833 ft)

Population (2011)
  - Total: 2,202
- Sex ratio / ♂ 1132/1070 ♀

Languages
  - Official: Punjabi
- Time zone: UTC+5:30 (IST)
- PIN: 144503
- Telephone code: 01823
- ISO 3166 code: IN-PB
- Post office: Pharala
- Website: nawanshahr.nic.in

Bharoli is a village in Shaheed Bhagat Singh Nagar district of Punjab State, India. It is located 3.5 kilometres (2.2 mi) away from postal head office Pharala, 15.5 kilometres (9.6 mi) from Banga, 29.4 kilometres (18.3 mi) from district headquarter Shaheed Bhagat Singh Nagar and 119 kilometres (74 mi) from state capital Chandigarh. The village is administrated by Sarpanch an elected representative of the village.

== Demography ==
As of 2011, Bharoli has a total number of 470 houses and population of 2202 of which include 1132 are males while 1070 are females according to the report published by Census India in 2011. The literacy rate of Bharoli is 82.87%, higher than the state average of 75.84%. The population of children under the age of 6 years is 211 which is 9.58% of total population of Bharoli, and child sex ratio is approximately 1049 as compared to Punjab state average of 846.

Most of the people are from Schedule Caste which constitutes 48.77% of total population in Bharoli. The town does not have any Schedule Tribe population so far.

As per the report published by Census India in 2011, 696 people were engaged in work activities out of the total population of Bharoli which includes 619 males and 77 females. According to census survey report 2011, 90.52% workers describe their work as main work and 9.48% workers are involved in Marginal activity providing livelihood for less than 6 months.

== Education ==
The village has a Punjabi medium, co-ed upper primary school founded in 1978. The schools provide mid-day meal as per Indian Midday Meal Scheme. The school provide free education to children between the ages of 6 and 14 as per Right of Children to Free and Compulsory Education Act.

Amardeep Singh Shergill Memorial college Mukandpur and Sikh National College Banga are the nearest colleges. Lovely Professional University is 22 kilometres (14 mi) away from the village.

== Transport ==
Banga railway station is the nearest train station however, Nawanshahr railway station is 29 kilometres (18 mi) away from the village. Sahnewal Airport is the nearest domestic airport which located 68 kilometres (42 mi) away in Ludhiana and the nearest international airport is located in Chandigarh also Sri Guru Ram Dass Jee International Airport is the second nearest airport which is 135 kilometres (84 mi) away in Amritsar.

== See also ==
- List of villages in India
