= List of 2025 films based on actual events =

This is a list of films and miniseries released in 2025 that are based on actual events. All films on this list are from American production unless indicated otherwise.

== 2025 ==
- 13 Days, 13 Nights (French: 13 Jours, 13 Nuits) (2025) – French-Belgian political thriller film depicting the 2021 evacuation of the French Embassy in Kabul during the Taliban takeover
- 40 seconds (Italian: 40 secondi) (2025) – Italian drama film following the true story of Willy Monteiro Duarte, a 21-year-old of Cape Verdean descent who was brutally beaten and killed in Colleferro while defending a friend
- 120 Bravehearts (Hindi: 120 बहादुर) (2025) – Indian Hindi-language historical war film depicting the Battle of Rezang La, considered one of the major events of the Sino-Indian War and fought on 18 November 1962
- 260 Days (Croatian: 260 dana) (2025) – Croatian-American war drama film based on Marijan Gubina's experience of captivity in Serbian concentration camp for 260 days during Croatian War of Independence, from 1 August 1991, to 16 April 1992
- A Cruel Love: The Ruth Ellis Story (2025) – British historical drama miniseries about Ruth Ellis, the last woman to be executed in the United Kingdom
- A Magnificent Life (French: Marcel et Monsieur Pagnol) (2025) – French animated biographical film following the life of 60-year-old Marcel Pagnol, an acclaimed playwright, novelist and filmmaker
- A Widow's Game (Spanish: La viuda negra) (2025) – Spanish crime drama film based on the murder of the engineer Antonio Navarro Cerdán
- Aema (Korean: 애마) (2025) – South Korean historical comedy drama miniseries depicting Hui-ran and Joo-ae's struggles while making the sensational hit Madame Aema, which swept Korea in the early 1980s
- Ajey: The Untold Story of a Yogi (Hindi: अजेय) (2025) – Indian Hindi-language biographical film depicting the life of Yogi Adityanath, the 22nd Chief Minister of Uttar Pradesh
- Akaal: The Unconquered (Punjabi: ਅਕਾਲ) (2025) – Indian Punjabi-language historical drama film depicting the resistance of Sikh warrior Akaal Singh against antagonistic forces after the death of Maharaja Ranjit Singh
- The Alto Knights (2025) – biographical crime drama film about the power struggle between Vito Genovese and Frank Costello, the top bosses of the Mafia
- American Primeval (2025) – Western historical miniseries dramatizing the fight to gain control of the American West and the violent clash between the Church of Jesus Christ of Latter-day Saints (LDS Church) and cultures in the Utah Territory, centering on the events surrounding the Mountain Meadows Massacre
- Amrum (2025) – German historical drama film based on Hark Bohm's childhood on the German island of Amrum
- The Anatomy of a Moment (Spanish: Anatomía de un instante) (2025) – Spanish historical drama miniseries exploring the circumstances of the characters of Adolfo Suárez, Santiago Carrillo, and Manuel Gutiérrez Mellado leading up to the 1981 Spanish coup attempt
- Anjila (2025) – Nepali biographical sports drama film based on the real life of Anjila Tumbapo Subba, goalkeeper and captain for Nepal women's national football team
- Antes de Nós (2025) – Spanish historical biographical drama film exploring the early years of Galician pater patriae Castelao
- Apple Cider Vinegar (2025) – Australian crime drama miniseries depicting the life of wellness guru Belle Gibson, who had a large social media following, where she pretended to be suffering from cancer but keeping the disease under control using self-care therapies
- The Battle of Oslo (Norwegian: Blücher) (2025) – Norwegian historical war thriller film following Colonel Birger Eriksen at Oscarsborg Fortress and the sinking of the German cruiser Blücher during the German invasion of Norway
- Belén (2025) – Argentine historical legal drama film following a lawyer's quest for justice when her client is falsely imprisoned for committing an illegal abortion
- The Bengal Files (2025) – Indian Hindi-language political propaganda film focusing on the Direct Action Day and the Noakhali riots, depicting the violence and its aftermath as a genocide
- Bhaimon Da (Assamese: ভাইমন দা) (2025) – Indian Assamese-language biographical drama film based on the life of noted Assamese Filmmaker Munin Barua
- Big Deal (Korean: 소주전쟁) (2025) – South Korean biographical drama film based on the real-life sale of the Jinro Group during the 1997 Asian financial crisis
- Binodiini (Bengali: বিনোদিনী: একতি নাতির উপাখ্যান) (2025) – Indian Bengali-language epic biographical drama film narrating the life of the renowned theatre artist Binodini Dasi, celebrated for defying societal norms and conventions, and chronicles her journey from a courtesan to the queen of Bengali theatre, highlighting her struggles, passions, betrayals, and triumphs
- Bison Kaalamaadan (Tamil: பைசன் காலமாடன்) (2025) – Indian Tamil-language sports action film based on the life of kabaddi player Manathi Ganesan, who strives to excel in the sport while overcoming caste-based discrimination
- Blood Type (Russian: Группа крови) (2025) – Russian war drama film telling the story of Soviet orphans in a Nazi-occupied "children's shelter" in Vyritsa during World War II, where orphans were not only subjected to hunger and grueling labor but were also used as blood donors
- Blue Moon (2025) – biographical musical drama film about the later days of songwriter Lorenz Hart, in particular his struggles with alcoholism and depression
- The Bombing of Pan Am 103 (2025) – British historical drama miniseries about the 1988 disaster of Pan Am Flight 103, which was the deadliest terrorist attack in British history
- The Breakthrough (Swedish: Genombrottet) (2025) – Swedish crime drama miniseries about how the 2004 murders of Mohammed Ammouri and Anna-Lena Svensson were finally solved in 2020 through forensic genetic genealogy
- Brian and Maggie (2025) – British biographical drama miniseries depicting the final television interview of soon-to-be-outgoing Prime Minister Margaret Thatcher and journalist Brian Walden which took place in 1989, and from which their friendship never recovered
- Broken Voices (Czech: Sbormistr) (2025) – Czech thriller drama film inspired by Bambini di Praga case and exploring the fragile line where innocence collides with abusive power
- California Schemin' (2025) – British-American biographical musical drama film telling the story of Silibil N' Brains, a rap duo who for three years pretended to be American in order to be taken seriously by the record industry and ended up touring with Eminem
- Can You Feel the Beat: The Lisa Lisa Story (2025) – biographical musical drama television film chronicling the life and career of Lisa Velez, professionally known as Lisa Lisa, a pioneering figure in the Latin-freestyle music genre
- The Captive (Spanish: El cautivo) (2025) – Spanish-Italian historical adventure drama film exploring the plight of wounded navy soldier Miguel de Cervantes after being taken captive to Algiers in 1575, involving his attempts to escape, the development of his skills for storytelling, and a romance with the governor of Algiers
- Chespirito: Not Really on Purpose (Spanish: Chespirito: Sin querer queriendo) (2025) – Mexican biographical miniseries based on the life of actor, comedian and producer Roberto Gómez Bolaños
- Chhaava (Hindi: छावा) (2025) – Indian Hindi-language epic historical action film based on the life of Chatrapati Sambhaji Maharaj, the second ruler of the Maratha Empire
- Chief of War (2025) – Hawaiian historical drama miniseries following Kaʻiana, a warrior chief (aliʻi) of Kauaʻi who travels outside the islands, returns home, and joins a bloody campaign until, at the last minute, he rebels against the unification of Hawaiʻi that took place from 1782 to 1810 under Kamehameha I
- Chopin, a Sonata in Paris (Polish: Chopin, Chopin!) (2025) – Polish historical biographical drama film following the life of Frédéric Chopin in the 1830
- Christy (2025) – biographical sports drama film about the former professional boxer Christy Martin
- The Chronology of Water (2025) – French-British-American biographical romantic drama film depicting the story of Lidia Yuknavitch
- The Conjuring: Last Rites (2025) – supernatural horror film based on the true-life investigations of the Smurl haunting
- Dead Man's Wire (2025) – historical crime film based on the true story of kidnapping by Tony Kiritsis in the 1970s
- Dead to Rights (Mandarin: 南京照相館) (2025) – Chinese historical drama film telling the true story of Chinese civilians who risked their lives to preserve photographic evidence of Japanese war crimes during the occupation of Nanjing, defying both military censorship and propaganda
- Death by Lightning (2025) – historical drama miniseries depicting the election and presidency of James A. Garfield, the 20th United States President as well as how his path crossed with Charles J. Guiteau who ended up shooting him, leading to Garfield's death
- Den of Thieves 2: Pantera (2025) – heist film inspired by the 2003 Antwerp diamond heist
- Devi Kusumasana (Sinhala: දේවි කුසුමාසන) (2025) – Sri Lankan Sinhala-language historical drama film based on the life of Kusumasana Devi and her affair with Konappu Bandara who later ascend the throne in Kandyan Kingdom as King Vimaladharmasuriya during Portuguese Ceylon
- The Diplomat (2025) – Indian Hindi-language political drama film following J. P. Singh, an Indian diplomat stationed at the Indian High Commission in Pakistan, whose life is upended by the arrival of Uzma Ahmed on 5 May 2017
- The Disappearance of Josef Mengele (German: Das Verschwinden des Josef Mengele) (2025) – German historical drama film following the story of notorious Nazi doctor Josef Mengele during his fugitive years, from Paraguay to the Brazilian jungle
- Dongji Rescue (Mandarin: 东极岛) (2025) – Chinese historical war action film based on the real-life Lisbon Maru incident during World War II whereby Chinese fishermen risked their lives to save over 300 British prisoners of war after a Japanese transport ship sank off the coast of Zhoushan, east China's Zhejiang, in 1942
- Dope Girls (2025) – British historical drama miniseries based on the lives of Kate Meyrick, Billie Carleton and Edgar Manning in early 20th-century Soho
- Dorothea (2025) – true crime horror film about the life and crimes of American serial killer Dorothea Puente.
- The Dumpling Queen (Mandarin: 水餃皇后) (2025) – Chinese-Hong Kong biographical drama film about the entrepreneurial journey of Chong Kin-wo, the founder of the Hong Kong frozen food brand Wanchai Ferry
- Duse (2025) – Italian-French biographical drama film following the life of Italian stage actress Eleonora Duse prior to the World War I, and the abrupt societal changes caused by the conflict
- Emergency (Hindi: आपातकाल) (2025) – Indian Hindi-language historical biographical drama film chronicling incidents that took place under the leadership of Indira Gandhi, one of the most Powerful Women in Indian History – including that of the Indian Emergency
- Evil Unbound (2025) – Chinese historical drama film following the story of atrocities committed by the Imperial Japanese Army's Unit 731 during World War II
- Franz (2025) – Czech-German biographical drama film following Franz Kafka's life from his early teens in his hometown of Prague to his premature death in 1924
- Fuori (2025) – Italian biographical drama film about writer Goliarda Sapienza
- Good American Family (2025) – biographical drama miniseries based on the adoption of Natalia Grace by Kristine and Michael Barnett
- The Great Arch (French: L'Inconnu de la Grande Arche) (2025) – French biographical drama film about Johan Otto von Spreckelsen, the Danish architect who won the 1983 competition for the design of the Grande Arche in Paris despite being virtually unknown
- Ground Zero (2025) – Indian Hindi-language action thriller film revolving around the story of BSF officer Narendra Nath Dhar Dubey, who led the operation in which terrorist Rana Tahir Nadeem, better known as Ghazi Baba, was killed in 2003
- Guru Nanak Jahaz (Punjabi: ਗੁਰੂ ਨਾਨਕ ਜਹਾਜ) (2025) – Indian Punjabi-language historical drama film about the historic events of Komagata Maru incident and Gadar party revolutionaries as well as the sacrifice of Mewa Singh Lopoke who assassinated William C. Hopkinson
- H Is for Hawk (2025) – British-American biographical drama film chronicling naturalist Helen MacDonald’s experience of grief following the sudden death of her father and her decision to train a Goshawk as a means of coping with that loss
- Hamnet (2025) – British-American historical drama film about the life of William Shakespeare and his wife Agnes Shakespeare, following the death of their 11-year-old son, Hamnet
- Happy Face (2025) – crime drama miniseries about Melissa Moore, the daughter of serial killer Keith Hunter Jesperson, who was known as the "Happy Face Killer"
- Heweliusz (2025) – Polish historical drama miniseries about the sinking of the MS Jan Heweliusz
- Homem com H (2025) – Brazilian biographical musical drama film portraying the trajectory of singer Ney Matogrosso, highlighting his personal life and career
- I Fought the Law (2025) – British biographical crime drama miniseries detailing bereaved British mother Ann Ming's long campaign to overturn the 800-year-old British double jeopardy law following the murder of her daughter
- I Swear (2025) – British biographical drama film based on the true story of John Davidson who was diagnosed with Tourette's syndrome at a time when it was barely identifiable
- Invincibles (Czech: Neporazitelní) (2025) – Czech sports drama film inspired by 2019 World Para Ice Hockey Championships which was held in Ostrava
- Kazbek (Uzbek: Осиё арслони) (2025) – Uzbek-Belarusian biographical film based on the life of Mamadali Topivoldiev, Hero of the Soviet Union
- Kesari Chapter 2 (2025) – Indian Hindi-language historical drama film centring around C. Sankaran Nair and the 1919 Jallianwala Bagh massacre
- Kesari Veer (Hindi: केसरी वीर) (2025) – Indian Hindi-language historical action film about Rajput warrior Hamirji Gohil, who fought against the Tughlaq empire to protect the Somnath Temple from destruction
- Last Breath (2025) – British-American survival thriller film telling the true story of a serious saturation diving accident in 2012, when diver Chris Lemons had his umbilical cable severed and became trapped around 100 metres (330 ft) under the sea without heat or light, and with only the small amount of breathing gas in his backup tank
- Last Days (2025) – biographical drama film telling the story of John Allen Chau, an idealistic missionary wanting to make contact with the Sentinelese, an isolated tribe living on North Sentinel Island in the Indian Ocean
- The Last Supper (2025) – religious drama film about the last days of Jesus Christ
- Lockerbie: A Search for Truth (2025) – British biographical drama miniseries depicting the story of Jim Swire, who embarked on a quest for justice after his daughter, Flora, died on Pan Am Flight 103
- The Lost Bus (2025) – survival drama film about the 2018 Camp Fire, which became the deadliest fire in California history
- Lucca's World (Spanish: Los Dos Hemisferios de Lucca) (2025) – Mexican drama film detailing Bárbara Anderson's efforts to secure medical treatment for her son, Lucca, after he received a serious diagnosis
- The Luckiest Man in America (2025) – drama film depicting the 1984 scandal orchestrated by ice cream truck driver Michael Larson when he appeared on and won the game show Press Your Luck
- Magellan (Portuguese: Magalhães) (2025) – Portuguese epic historical drama film Ferdinand Magellan and Beatriz Barbosa's 1517 marriage in Seville, focusing on their brief time together before his departure on the Spanish crown's expedition
- Marty Supreme (2025) – sports comedy-drama film loosely inspired by American table tennis player Marty Reisman
- The Match (Korean: 승부) (2025) – South Korean biographical sports drama film based on two real-life notable Go players Cho Hun-hyun and Lee Chang-ho
- McVeigh (2025) – drama film based on the true story of domestic terrorist Timothy McVeigh, the perpetrator of the Oklahoma City bombing in 1995
- Miss Austen (2025) – British historical drama miniseries portraying the story of Cassandra Austen, sister to the renowned novelist Jane Austen
- Monster: The Ed Gein Story (2025) – biographical crime drama miniseries focusing on convicted murderer, graverobber, and suspected serial killer Ed Gein
- Mr Burton (2025) – British biographical drama film about the early life of Welsh actor Richard Burton
- Murdaugh: Death in the Family (2025) – crime drama miniseries based on the Murdaugh Murders Podcast by Mandy Matney, who investigated and blogged about the unfolding case and was often the first to reveal new information
- Nonnas (2025) – biographical comedy-drama film based on the life of Joe Scaravella, the owner of Staten Island (New York City) restaurant Enoteca Maria, who risks everything to honor his recently deceased, beloved mother by opening an Italian restaurant with actual grandmothers as chefs
- Not Without Hope (2025) – survival thriller film based the real-life sole survivor of a 2009 boating accident that took the lives of NFL football players Marquis Cooper and Corey Smith
- Nouvelle Vague (2025) – French-American comedy drama film following the shooting of Breathless, one of the first feature films of the Nouvelle Vague era of French cinema, in 1959
- Nuremberg (2025) – historical drama film following psychiatrist Douglas Kelley, who is challenged with determining if Hermann Göring is fit to stand at the Nuremberg trials
- Our Father, Our President (Catalan: Parenostre) (2025) – Spanish Catalan-language biographical drama film reconstructing the downfall of Catalan pater patriae Jordi Pujol
- Out Standing (2025) – Canadian biographical drama film depicting the life of Sandra Perron adapting to civilian life after resigning from her position with the Canadian Armed Forces amid a media firestorm around allegations, which she refuses to publicly confirm, that she was sexually assaulted
- Outrageous (2025) – British historical drama miniseries based on the story of the Mitford sisters, six sisters who refused to play by the rules and whose often-scandalous lives made headlines around the world
- Palestine 36 (Arabic: فلسطين ٣٦) (2025) – Palestinian historical drama film recounting the 1936–1939 Arab revolt against British colonial rule in Palestine during the Mandate period
- Peter Hujar's Day (2025) – biographical drama film about photographer Peter Hujar and writer Linda Rosenkrantz in December 1974
- Phule (Hindi: फुले) (2025) – Indian Hindi-language biographical drama film based on the lives of Jyotirao Phule and Savitribai Phule
- Pike River (2025) – New Zealand disaster drama film based on the Pike River Mine disaster of 2010
- The Poet (Russian: Пророк. История Александра Пушкина) (2025) – Russian historical musical drama film depicting the life story of the famous Russian poet, Alexander Pushkin
- Putin (2025) – Polish biographical film depicting the rise to power of Russian president Vladimir Putin
- Queen of Coal (Spanish: Miss Carbón) (2025) – Argentine-Spanish biographical drama film following the story of Carla Antonella "Carlita" Rodríguez, a trans woman and the first female miner in the Patagonia, an occupation vetoed for women
- Queen of the Ring (2025) – biographical sports drama film about female professional wrestler Mildred Burke
- Quezon (2025) – Philippine epic historical drama film focusing on the political rise of Philippine President Manuel L. Quezon
- The Ritual (2025) – horror film based on a true story, it follows priests Theophilus Riesinger and Joseph Steige as they attempt to put aside their differences to save an allegedly possessed young woman Emma Schmidt through a series of exorcisms
- Rodnina (Russian: Роднина) (2025) – Russian biographical sports drama film based on the life and figure skating career of Irina Rodnina
- Romería (2025) – Spanish-German drama film inspired by Carla Simón's own life and is a fictionalized retelling of the story of how her parents met and fell in love in Vigo, and the beginning of their addiction to drugs
- Roofman (2025) – crime comedy drama film about the fugitive Jeffrey Manchester, a former United States Army Reserve officer, known colloquially as Roofman due to his propensity to steal from branches of McDonald's after entering their premises via the roof
- Rosemead (2025) – drama film based on a 2017 LA Times column by Frank Shyong
- Rowing for Gold (Russian: Первый на Олимпе) (2025) – Russian sports war film based on real events and tells the story of how Yura Tyukalov survived the Siege of Leningrad and subsequently became the first Soviet Olympic champion in rowing
- Saipan (2025) – Irish sports drama film about the Republic of Ireland national football team and the eponymous Saipan incident between player Roy Keane and manager Mick McCarthy in the lead up to the 2002 FIFA World Cup
- Sant Tukaram (Hindi: संत तुकाराम) (2025) – Indian Hindi-language biographical drama film based on 17th century poet Sant Tukaram
- Sarah's Oil (2025) – biographical drama film depicting the true story of eleven year old Sarah Rector, an African American girl born in Oklahoma Indian Territory in the early 1900s, who believes there is oil beneath the barren land she's allotted
- The Senior (2025) – sports drama film based on the true story of Mike Flynt, who at age 59, became a college football linebacker
- The Smashing Machine (2025) – biographical sports drama film about former amateur wrestler and MMA fighter Mark Kerr
- Smoke (2025) – crime drama miniseries inspired by Firebug, a podcast about the crimes of arsonist John Leonard Orr
- Soloz: Game of Life (2025) – Malaysian biographical drama film about esports legend Muhammad Faris Zakaria (Soloz)
- Song Sung Blue (2025) – biographical musical drama film about Mike and Claire Sardina, who performed as the Neil Diamond tribute band Lightning & Thunder
- Soul on Fire (2025) – biographical drama film about John O'Leary, a real-life St. Louis native who survived fire burns which covered his entire body
- Sovereign (2025) – crime thriller film following Jerry and Joe Kane, a father and son who align themselves with the sovereign citizen movement and clash with Police Chief John Bouchart
- Springsteen: Deliver Me from Nowhere (2025) – biographical musical drama film chronicling the making of Bruce Springsteen's 1982 Nebraska album when he was a young musician on the cusp of global superstardom, struggling to reconcile the pressures of success with the ghosts of his past
- Studna (2025) – Czech crime drama miniseries based on a 1968 tragedy that occurred in Vonoklasy
- Superstar (Spanish: Superestar) (2025) – Spanish biographical miniseries depicting the unlikely breakout of pop singer and social icon Tamara alongside a troupe of other oddball television personalities
- Suspect: The Shooting of Jean Charles de Menezes (2025) – British crime drama miniseries about the 2005 killing of Brazilian electrician Jean Charles de Menezes by officers of the Metropolitan Police Service at Stockwell station on the London Underground after he was wrongly deemed to be one of the fugitives involved in the previous day's failed bombing attempts
- Swiped (2025) – biographical drama film based on Whitney Wolfe Herd, founder and CEO of Bumble
- The Testament of Ann Lee (2025) – British-American historical musical drama film about Ann Lee, the founding leader of the Shakers religious sect in the 18th century
- Toxic Town (2025) – British drama miniseries following the story of three mothers involved in the Corby toxic waste case
- The Truce (Spanish: La tregua, Kazakh: Бітім) (2025) – Spanish-Kazakh war drama film about Spanish prisoners in the Soviet Gulag system, inspired by true events
- The Twisted Tale of Amanda Knox (2025) – biographical crime drama miniseries based on the true story of Amanda Knox and her wrongful conviction in the murder of Meredith Kercher
- The Unbreakable Boy (2025) – biographical drama film based on the book The Unbreakable Boy: A Father's Fear, a Son's Courage, and a Story of Unconditional Love, authored by Scott Michael LeRette and Susy Flory, which is based on a true story
- Vitória (2025) – Brazilian crime drama film telling the true story of an 80-year-old woman who single-handedly dismantled a drug trafficking scheme in Copacabana
- The Voice of Hind Rajab (Arabic: صوت هند رجب) (2025) – Tunisian-French crime drama film following the killing of Hind Rajab, a five-year-old Palestinian girl who lived in the Gaza Strip and was killed by the IDF during the Israeli invasion of the Gaza Strip
- Warfare (2025) – war drama film based on Ray Mendoza's experiences during the Iraq War as a U.S. Navy SEAL, the film depicts an encounter he and his platoon experienced on 19 November 2006 after the Battle of Ramadi
- The Wonderers (French: Qui brille au combat) (2025) – French drama film based on the true story of a young girl who has a severe disability that leads to autistic behavior
- Words of War (2025) – biographical drama film about the late Russian journalist Anna Politkovskaya
- The World Will Tremble (2025) – historical drama film depicting the true story of an attempt to escape the Chełmno extermination camp during World War II by Michael Podchlebnik and Szlama Ber Winer
- The Yellow Tie (2025) – Romanian-Italian biographical drama film about the life of conductor and composer Sergiu Celibidache
