= Komagata Maru incident =

1914 exclusion of migrants in Vancouver

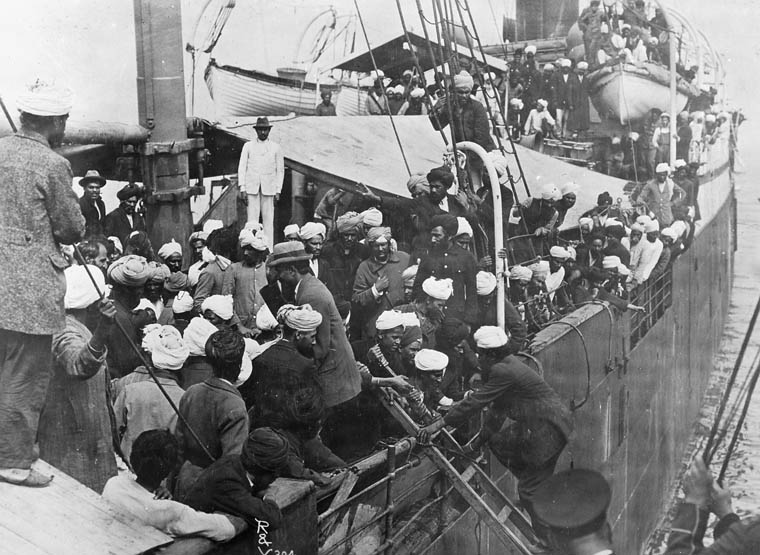
- Sikhs, Muslims, and Hindus aboard Komagata Maru
- Date: May 23, 1914
- Location: Vancouver, British Columbia
- Outcome: Ship forced out of Canada
- Deaths: Twenty-six in government records (Note: Para 30 of Report of the Komagata Maru Committee of Inquiry states that 20 Sikhs, 2 Europeans, 2 Punjab Police Officers and 2 locals died in the riots 75 by witnesses present)

The Komagata Maru incident was an immigration dispute in which passengers aboard the Japanese steamship Komagata Maru, also called Guru Nanak Jahaz by its passengers, were denied entry in Vancouver, British Columbia, Canada, on 23 May 1914. Most of the 376 passengers (340 Sikhs, 24 Muslims and 12 Hindus from Punjab province, British India) were denied entry despite being British subjects under Canada's continuous journey regulation, due to suspected links to revolutionaries in India.

Most of the Muslim passengers came from the Shapur District in western Punjab (now Pakistan), while others came from farming districts in central Punjab. They belonged to three distinct regions: Doaba, Malwa, and Majha. Most passengers were from Majha and Malwa, the home regions of Gurdit Singh and his two principal lieutenants, while Doaba was less represented. Local trust and regional loyalties affected who chose to join the Guru Nanak Jahaz voyage.

Nearly all the passengers were from rich landowning village families. Many of the passengers had experience in the army and in the police in East Asia. They were independent emigrants for whom emigration meant to earn more money to build a better future for their families. The important attractions of North America were high salaries and investment opportunities in small businesses like farms and city lots.

Only 24 passengers were allowed to disembark, and the ship was forced to return to India under naval escort on 23 July 1914. Upon reaching Budge Budge, near Calcutta (present-day Kolkata) on 29 September 1914, the Indian Imperial Police attempted to arrest the group leaders, leading to violence in which police opened fire and killed 20 passengers while others were arrested or imprisoned.

The incident highlighted Canada's racially discriminatory immigration policies in the early twentieth century, later resulting in public apologies issued by government officials, and has been the focus of scholarship, public memorialisation, artistic and literary portrayals.

== Immigration controls in Canada ==
The Canadian government attempted to restrict immigration through an order in council issued on 8 January 1908, that prohibited immigration of persons who "in the opinion of the Minister of the Interior" did not "come from the country of their birth or citizenship by a continuous journey and or through tickets purchased before leaving their country of their birth or nationality". This continuous journey regulation excluded Indian immigrants as the government pressured companies to avoid selling direct ticketing from India to Canada. These restrictions were implemented amidst significant immigration to Canada from the United States, Europe, and Asia. Prior to the Komagata Maru incident, strained race relations led to the anti-Asian riots of 1907.

== Voyage ==
=== Departure from Hong Kong ===
Gurdit Singh, a businessman based in Singapore and Malaysia, was aware that Canadian exclusion laws were preventing Punjabis from immigrating to Canada. He chartered the ship Komagata Maru in March 1914, to sail from Calcutta to Vancouver, to reopen immigration from India to Canada. Hong Kong became the point of departure. After signing the charter for the ship, Gurdit Singh was arrested on 25 March 1914, but the police determined they did not have a case against him. (Note: According to Baba Gurdit Singh, documents pertaining to the ship were published beforehand in the Post Office Gazette. On examining his papers, the police didn't find anything objectionable.) Following delays caused by Francis Henry May, the Governor of Hong Kong, the ship departed on 4 April with 165 passengers.

The ship arrived in Shanghai on 8 April and subsequently stopped at the Japanese ports of Moji on 19 April to take on coal and 86 passengers and Yokohama for another 14 passengers, including Ghadarite leaders Maulvi Barkatullah and Bhagwan Singh Gyanee. While the ship sailed from Moji to Yokohama, Gurdit Singh traveled ahead by train to Kobe to negotiate charter payments, eventually rejoining the ship in Yokohama. The ship left Yokohama on 3 May with 376 passengers (340 Sikhs, 24 Muslims, and 12 Hindus).

=== Arrival in Vancouver ===
When Komagata Maru arrived at Burrard Inlet on 23 May 1914, immigration officials prohibited the ship from docking. Authorities, including Prime Minister Robert Borden, conservative MP H. H. Stevens, immigration official Malcolm R.J. Reid, kept the ship offshore, cutting off communication and stalling the examination process, hoping to force the charter to default due to lack of funds.

The local South Asian community formed a "Shore Committee," led by Husain Rahim, Bhag Singh Bhikiwind, Mitt Singh Pandori, Balwant Singh Khurdpur, Muhammad Akbar (Punjabi-Canadian). The committee successfully raised $20,000 to take over the ship's charter. On 29–30 June, lawyer J. Edward Bird pushed for a test case on behalf of passenger Munshi Singh, but the British Columbia Court of Appeal unanimously ruled against the passengers, upholding the discriminatory immigration laws and denying them entry on 6 July.

At the time, few Canadians had any sympathy for the passengers on the Guru Nanak Jahaz or believed that they had a right to enter a self-governing country such as Canada. Moreover, very few left-wing Canadians could sympathize with the anti-British, anti-imperial perspectives from Gurdit Singh’s young, politicized lieutenants.

=== Departure from Vancouver ===
Following the decision, tensions escalated as immigration officials withheld food and water to force the ship's departure. On 19 July, an armed police force of 150 men aboard the harbour tug Sea Lion attempted to take control of the Komagata Maru. The passengers repelled the boarding party by showering them with coal, fire bricks, and scrap metal. Prime Minister Robert Borden then ordered the naval cruiser HMCS Rainbow to "enforce the law firmly and effectively but with no unnecessary violence". Under the threat of naval bombardment, the federal Minister of Agriculture, Martin Burrell, arrived in Vancouver to negotiate a peaceful resolution. The Canadian government agreed to provision the ship for the return voyage, and the Shore Committee allowed the captain to take control. Only 22 passengers were admitted to Canada. On 23 July, the ship departed.

During the controversy, Punjabi residents of Canada had supplied information to William C. Hopkinson, a British immigration official. Two of these informants were murdered in August 1914. Hopkinson was shot to death at the Vancouver courthouse while attending the Punjabi trials in October 1914.

=== Return to India ===
With the outbreak of World War I, British officials, suspecting the passengers of harboring anti-colonial intent, barred them from disembarking in Hong Kong and Singapore, forcing the ship to continue all the way to India. On 26 September 1914, the Komagata Maru arrived at the mouth of the Hooghly River near Calcutta. Three days later, the ship was forced to anchor at Budge Budge, where British authorities attempted to force the passengers onto a special train bound for Punjab. The passengers refused to board out of suspicion and instead marched toward Calcutta. However, armed police intercepted them. After an altercation involving a police superintendent, troops opened fire into the crowd, killing 20 passengers. Others were severely injured or jailed. Gurdit Singh escaped.Mahatma Gandhi urged him to give himself up as a "true patriot". Upon his doing so he was imprisoned for five years.

The Komagata Maru incident helped spread nationalist beliefs between many Indians, including rural and non-elite communities. It also initiated growing disappointment with the British Empire, specifically among Sikh soldiers, who saw how the passengers being treated as an obvious example of racial discrimination. The incident increased instability and encouraged resistance, as many soldiers started questioning their loyalty to the Empire. As a result, the failed voyage weakened support for British rule and strengthened anti-colonial feelings in India and abroad.

== Significance ==
=== Assassination of William Hopkinson ===
The Komagata Maru incident resulted in murders in the South Asian community in Vancouver. On 15 September 1914, Bela Singh, an informant working for Inspector William Hopkinson, murdered two Sikhs inside the Vancouver gurdwara. Hopkinson threatened to kill Mewa Singh, an eyewitness, if he did not testify in favour of Bela Singh. However, Mewa Singh testified against Bela Singh. On 21 October 1914, Mewa Singh then killed Hopkinson in the courthouse before the latter could testify in defence of Bela Singh. Mewa Singh surrendered himself, was sentenced to death, and was hanged on 11 January 1915. He is considered a martyr in South Asian communities.

=== The Ghadar Movement ===
Price and Bains note the incident's transnational significance, at which a diasporic movement for social justice became a source of anti-colonial sentiment. They place it within a network of colonies and countries that restricted immigration, and within a developing British-American understanding on Asian immigration that followed the anti-Asian riots of 1907 on the Pacific coast. The Ghadar Movement was formed as the Hindustani Association of America at Astoria in 1913. The Yugantar Ashram in San Francisco, then the centre of Ghadar activity, telegraphed its support to Gurdit Singh during the standoff at Burrard Inlet. Canadian officials intercepted the message and regarded it as "evidence of sedition and conspiracy." The perception of Indian activists as radicals coupled with the Komagatu Maru incident led to the Asiatic Barred Zone Act of 1917, which barred immigration from India, Southeast Asia, and the Pacific Islands to the United States. Between November 1917 to April 1918, the US government prosecuted 17 Indians, 9 Americans, and 9 Germans in the 'Hindu conspiracy' trial. All were found guilty and sentenced to 2 to 22 months.

== Legacy ==
=== India ===
In 1952, the Indian government set up a memorial to the Komagata Maru martyrs near the Budge Budge. It was inaugurated by Indian Prime Minister Jawaharlal Nehru. The monument is locally known as the Punjabi Monument and is modelled as a kirpan (Sikh dagger) rising up toward the sky.

A tripartite agreement was signed between the Kolkata Port Trust, Union Ministry of Culture and the Komagata Maru Trust for the construction of a three-storey building behind the existing memorial. As of 2015, the proposed building was to contain an administrative office and library on the ground floor, a museum on the first floor, and an auditorium on the second, at a cost of ₹24 million.

In 2014, the Indian government issued two coins, ₹5 and ₹100, to mark the centennial anniversary.

=== Canada ===
A plaque commemorating the 75th anniversary of the departure of Komagata Maru was placed in the Sikh gurdwara in Vancouver on 23 July 1989. Also, a plaque for the 75th anniversary lies in Portal Park, at 1099 West Hastings Street, Vancouver. The 80th anniversary of the arrival of Komagata Maru is commemorated by a plaque placed in Vancouver Harbour in 1994.

The first phase of the Komagata Maru Museum was opened in June 2012 at the Khalsa Diwan Society Vancouver Ross Street Temple. A monument in remembrance of the Komagata Maru incident was unveiled on July 23, 2012. It is located near the steps of the seawall that lead up to the Vancouver Convention Centre West Building in Coal Harbour. A stamp commemorating the 100th anniversary of the arrival of Komagata Maru was released by Canada Post on May 1, 2014./

Raj Singh Toor, spokesperson and vice-president of the Descendants of the Komagata Maru Society has worked to bring about commemorations to the legacy of the Komagata Maru. Toor is a grandson of Baba Puran Singh Janetpura, one of the passengers on the Komagata Maru. After Toor spoke to Surrey, British Columbia city council, part of 75A Avenue in Surrey was renamed Komagata Maru Way on July 31, 2019. As well, a heritage storyboard titled "Remembering the Komagata Maru" was installed at R. A. Nicholson Park in Surrey on September 17, 2020. On December 23, 2020, as a result of Toor's presentations to Delta city council, a storyboard commemorating the Komagata Maru was installed in the North Delta Social Heart Plaza.

On October 4, 2022, an interpretive plaque for the Komagata Maru Perimeter Trail and Dock was unveiled in New Westminster, BC, after Toor requested New Westminster name a civic asset in memory of the Komagata Maru. One month later, on November 9, 2022, Port Moody, BC, unveiled a new heritage storyboard at Rocky Point Park recalling the plight of the Komagata Maru, after Toor's 2021 presentation to Port Moody City Council. Richmond, BC, installed on July 12, 2023, two Komagata Maru commemorative signs in King George Park following Toor's 2019 request that the city acknowledge the journey of the Komagata Maru.

Then on July 22, 2023, the section of South Fraser Way in front of the Abbotsford Sikh Temple National Historic Site (also known as the Gur Sikh Temple) was renamed Komagata Maru Way. As well, three signs were installed, detailing the contributions of the Sikh community in helping to address the thirst, hunger, and ill health that many passengers of the Komagata Maru were experiencing. These commemorations were the result of work that Toor began in 2019 along with the Abbotsford Parks, Recreation & Culture department.

Toor was part of the unveiling ceremony in Mission, BC, on August 16, 2023, of a Komagata Maru interpretive sign at Jack Poole Park. This sign was the result of Toor's April 19, 2021, presentation to Mission council requesting recognition of the Komagata Maru, given the importance of the South Asian community in Mission's history. Mission City Council and the Mission School Board also approved a display board that is to be used to teach Mission students about the Komagata Maru incident, and about the need for respecting and valuing people of different cultures.

In 2024, Canada Place in downtown Vancouver was co-named Komagata Maru Place. The new signage was unveiled on February 9, 2024, following five years of advocacy by Toor.

As well, due to lobbying efforts by Toor, May 23 is a day of remembrance for the passengers of the Komagata Maru in the province of BC and many of its municipalities. May 23, 2020, was recognized by the city of Surrey and the province of British Columbia as Komagata Maru Remembrance Day. The city of New Westminster and city of Victoria declared May 23, 2021, as Komagata Maru Remembrance Day, while the city of Vancouver commemorated the day as Komagata Maru Day of Remembrance. May 23, 2023, was proclaimed by the City of Mission as Komagata Maru Remembrance Day. The city of Burnaby and the city of Port Coquitlam proclaimed May 23 of every year as Komagata Maru Remembrance Day.

Toor has also been active in holding those in power at the time responsible for their actions. Following Toor's 2018 request to Prime Minister Justin Trudeau, H. H. Stevens' name was removed from a federal building in Vancouver.

=== Governmental apologies ===
In response to calls for the government of Canada to address historic wrongs involving immigration and wartime measures, the Conservative government in 2006 created the community historical recognition program to provide grant and contribution funding for community projects linked to wartime measures and immigration restrictions and a national historical recognition program to fund federal initiatives, developed in partnership with various groups. The announcement was made on June 23, 2006, when Prime Minister Stephen Harper apologized in the House of Commons for the head tax against Chinese immigrants.

On August 6, 2006, Prime Minister Harper made a speech at the Ghadri Babiyan da Mela (Festival of the Ghadar Party) in Surrey, BC, where he stated that the government of Canada acknowledged the Komagata Maru incident and announced the government's commitment to "undertake consultations with the Indo-Canadian community on how best to recognize this sad moment in Canada's history". On April 3, 2008, Ruby Dhalla, MP for Brampton—Springdale, tabled motion 469 (M-469) in the House of Commons which read, "That, in the opinion of the House, the government should officially apologize to the Indo-Canadian community and to the individuals impacted in the 1914 Komagata Maru incident, in which passengers were prevented from landing in Canada." On May 10, 2008, Jason Kenney, Secretary of State (Multiculturalism and Canadian Identity), announced the Indo-Canadian community would be able to apply for up to $2.5 million in grants and contributions funding to commemorate the Komagata Maru incident. Following further debate on May 15, 2008, Dhalla's motion was passed by the House of Commons.

On May 23, 2008, the Legislative Assembly of British Columbia unanimously passed a resolution "that this Legislature apologizes for the events of May 23, 1914, when 376 passengers of the Komagata Maru, stationed off Vancouver harbour, were denied entry by Canada. The House deeply regrets that the passengers, who sought refuge in our country and our province, were turned away without benefit of the fair and impartial treatment befitting a society where people of all cultures are welcomed and accepted."

On August 3, 2008, Harper appeared at the 13th annual Ghadri Babiyan Da Mela (festival) in Surrey, B.C., to issue an apology for the Komagata Maru incident. He said, in response to the House of Commons motion calling for an apology by the government, "On behalf of the government of Canada, I am officially conveying as prime minister that apology."

Some members of the Sikh community were unsatisfied with the apology because they expected it to be made in Parliament. Secretary of State Jason Kenney said: "The apology has been given and it won't be repeated". Many scholars and community advocates argued that Harper's 2006 statement was an acknowledgement rather than a formal parliamentary apology. As a result, calls for a full official apology persisted until Prime Minister Justin Trudeau issued one in the House of Commons on 18 May 2016.

Before Prime Minister Harper made his statement about the tragedy (at the Mela Ghadri Babiyan Da), members of the Mohan Singh Memorial Foundation had insisted the apology during an election swing through Surrey was not enough, and that a formal apology in Parliament was required (this was a part of the original ask by the Mohan Singh Memorial Foundation). Mr. Harper's team was not willing to make that offer, and he was roundly booed at the festival by foundation members when he did make his statement. The foundation continued in its efforts to obtain an apology, and eventually worked with the government of Justin Trudeau to make it a reality. Trudeau promised an apology in the House of Commons before he was elected PM, and kept that promise in 2016, when he offered an official apology in the House of Commons.

To members of the Professor Mohan Singh Memorial Foundation only an official apology in Parliament, and written into Hansard, was acceptable. The apology, according to the group (and many legal experts they worked with) had to be entered into the public record - the record of the House of Commons - or it was just empty words. It was important to the group that future generations would have that record, and the apology didn't just disappear in a pile of press releases and web stories.

The British Columbia Regiment (Duke of Connaught's Own), which was involved in the expulsion of the Komagata Maru, was commanded by a Sikh, Harjit Sajjan, from 2011 until 2014. He later became Minister of National Defence.

On May 18, 2016, Prime Minister Justin Trudeau gave a formal "full apology" for the incident in the House of Commons. This formal apology came about due to lobbying from the Indo-Canadian community, such as the work done by the Professor Mohan Singh Memorial Foundation (as specifically noted in the Prime Minister's speech) and The Descendants of the Komagata Maru Society.

Trudeau’s apology highlighted the role of Sikh leaders and communities in making the apology possible. His cabinet has the most Sikhs of any Canadian cabinet in history. It was shown as a sincere and overdue acknowledgement of Canada’s history of discrimination. The apology reflected a broader effort to confront the legacy of racism and understand the harm done to Indigenous peoples and immigrants.

On May 18, 2021, due to lobbying efforts of Raj Singh Toor, Vancouver City Council said that they "sincerely apologize for the role the City played in the incident, especially supporting laws that prevented passengers from disembarking". Also due to lobbying efforts of Toor, New Westminster City Council acknowledged on September 27, 2021, that the city's "...formal support of discriminatory, racist and exclusionary legislation contributed to the plight of the passengers of the Komagata Maru, both in Canadian waters and upon their return to India." Consequently, "The City of New Westminster formally apologizes to the South Asian community and the descendants of the survivors of the Komagata Maru for its past actions which resulted in discrimination and exclusion."

Prime Minister Carney commemorated the Komagata Maru incident on the anniversary of the ship’s arrival in Vancouver on 23 May 2026. Speaking in Ottawa, Ontario, he described the incident as one of the darkest chapters in Canadian history, a moment when Canada failed to uphold its values, with lasting consequences. He emphasized that the tragedy serves as a reminder of the harmful impacts of racism and discrimination and called on Canadians to honour the memory of the passengers, their descendants, and the communities that endured the injustice.

=== Media ===
Jeevan Sangram is a 1974 Indian Hindi-language action-drama film directed by Rajbans Khanna. Based on the Komagata Maru incident it follows Arjun on board the ship and his return to India thereafter where he escapes the firing at the harbour and becomes a rebel against British rule in India.

The first Canadian play based on the incident is The Komagata Maru Incident, written by Sharon Pollock and presented in January 1976. It was presented again in 2017 by the Stratford Festival, directed by Keira Loughran, starring Kiran Ahluwalia.

The first Canadian novel based on the incident is Lions of the Sea, written by Jessi Thind and published in 2001. In 2011 Diana Lobb cited Lions of the Sea as one of the first fictionalized South Asian perspectives on the Komagata Maru in her philosophical dissertation presented to the University of Waterloo. Several friends of the author suggested the title of the novel for the Sikh Heritage Museum of Canada Komagata Maru exhibition in 2014 which was subsequently titled "Lions of the Sea: The National Komagata Maru Exhibition."

Another book that examines the 1914 Komagata Maru incident is The Voyage of the Komagata Maru: The Sikh Challenge to Canada's Colour Bar is a historical non-fiction book by Canadian historian Hugh J.M. Johnston. First published in 1979 and later released as an expanded and fully revised edition in 2014 by UBC Press to coincide with the 100-year anniversary of the arrival of the Komagata Maru.

Another book that is suitable for teens aged 13 to 18 is Righting Canada's Wrongs: The Komagata Maru and Canada's Anti-Indian Immigration Policies in the Twentieth Century by Canadian author Pamela Hickman. It published as a part of the Righting Canada's Wrongs series.

Ajmer Rode wrote the play Komagata Maru based on the incident in 1984. In 1989, when Indo-Canadian community of British Columbia commemorated the 75th anniversary of the Komagata Maru, Sadhu Binning and Sukhwant Hundal wrote a play Samundari Sher Nal Takkar (The Battle with the Sealion) and co-edited and produced first issue of Punjabi literary magazine Watan on the Komagata Maru incident. Phinder Dulai wrote A Letter To The Maru – 1914–1994. The letter was a fictionalized narrative utilizing both public record documentation and archival material; the piece ran in 1998 in an issue of Rungh Magazine.

Can You Hear the Nightbird Call? is a 2006 novel by the Indo-Canadian writer Anita Rau Badami, it follows a woman named Bibi-ji who retraces her father's steps during the incident in Canada, with the plot being linked with other contemporary issues in India. Oh Canada, Oh Komagata Maru is a 2012 play by Alia Rehana Somani which explores memories of the incident among the Indo-Canadian community.

In 2004, Ali Kazimi's feature documentary Continuous Journey was released. This is the first in-depth film to examine the events surrounding the turning-away of the Komagata Maru. The primary source research done for the film led to the discovery of rare film footage of the ship in Vancouver harbour. Eight years in the making, Continuous Journey has won over ten awards, including the Most Innovative Canadian Documentary at DOXA, Vancouver 2005, and a Golden Conch at the Mumbai International Film Festival, 2006. Also in 2006, Kazimi assisted broadcaster Jowi Taylor in obtaining a piece of red cedar from Jack Uppal's Goldwood Industries, the first Sikh-owned timber mill in British Columbia, as a way of bringing the Komagata Maru story and the story of Sikhs in Canada into the Six String Nation project. Parts of this wood now serve as kerfing strips on either side of the end block in the interior of Voyageur, the guitar at the heart of the project.

The CBC radio play Entry Denied, by the Indo-Canadian scriptwriter Sugith Varughese focuses on the incident.

In 2012, filmmaker Ali Kazimi's book Undesirables: White Canada and the Komagata Maru was published by Douglas & McIntyre.

In 2014, dream / arteries, written by Phinder Dulai, was published by Talon Books. The poetry book begins with a suite of poems that utilize archival records, public repositories, and online uploaded material never published before, including new photographs of the Komagata Maru from the Vancouver Public Library. Dulai’s 2014 poetry collection commemorates the Komagata Maru incident through poetry, storytelling, art, music, and literature. These creative works honour those affected by the event, acknowledge the historical harm, and encourage both mourning and critical reflection. Dulai chose poetry because it challenges traditional history and official narratives. Rather than emphasizing on repair or the nation-state, his work remembers the Komagata Maru passengers through themes of grief, memory, and enduring connections within the South Asian community.

Simon Fraser University Library launched a website Komagata Maru: Continuing the Journey in 2012 funded by the Department of Citizenship and Immigration Canada under the auspices of the Community Historical Recognition Program (CHRP). This website contains information and documents related to the Komagata Maru incident and a timeline that unfolds the details and supports teaching, research and knowledge about the Komagata Maru for school-aged, post-secondary and general audiences.

In 2010 - First Komagata Maru Memorial Youth Hockey Tournament was held in Hong Kong by Punjab Youth Club (HK) in the memory of Komagata Incident. From 2011 Punjab Youth Club (HK) made in annual. In year 2023 13th KGM Memorial Hockey tournament was held in Hong Kong

=== Film and Literature ===
Guru Nanak Jahaz, a Punjabi film based on the Komagata Maru incident and the murder of William C. Hopkinson was released in May 2025. It stars Gurpreet Ghuggi as Baba Gurdit Singh, Tarsem Jassar as Mewa Singh Lopoke and Edward Sonnenblick as William C. Hopkinson.

== Gallery ==
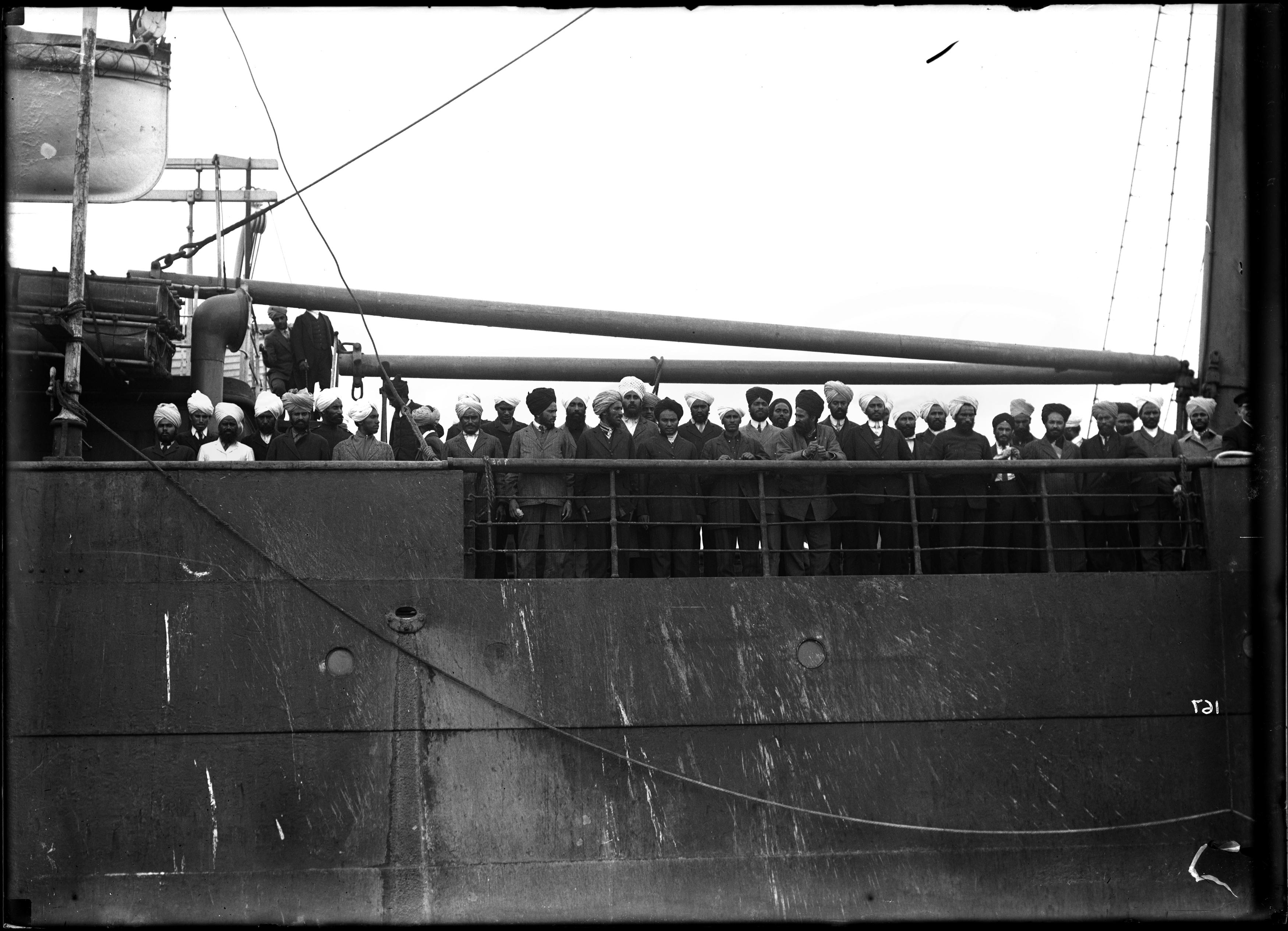
Komagata Maru incident.

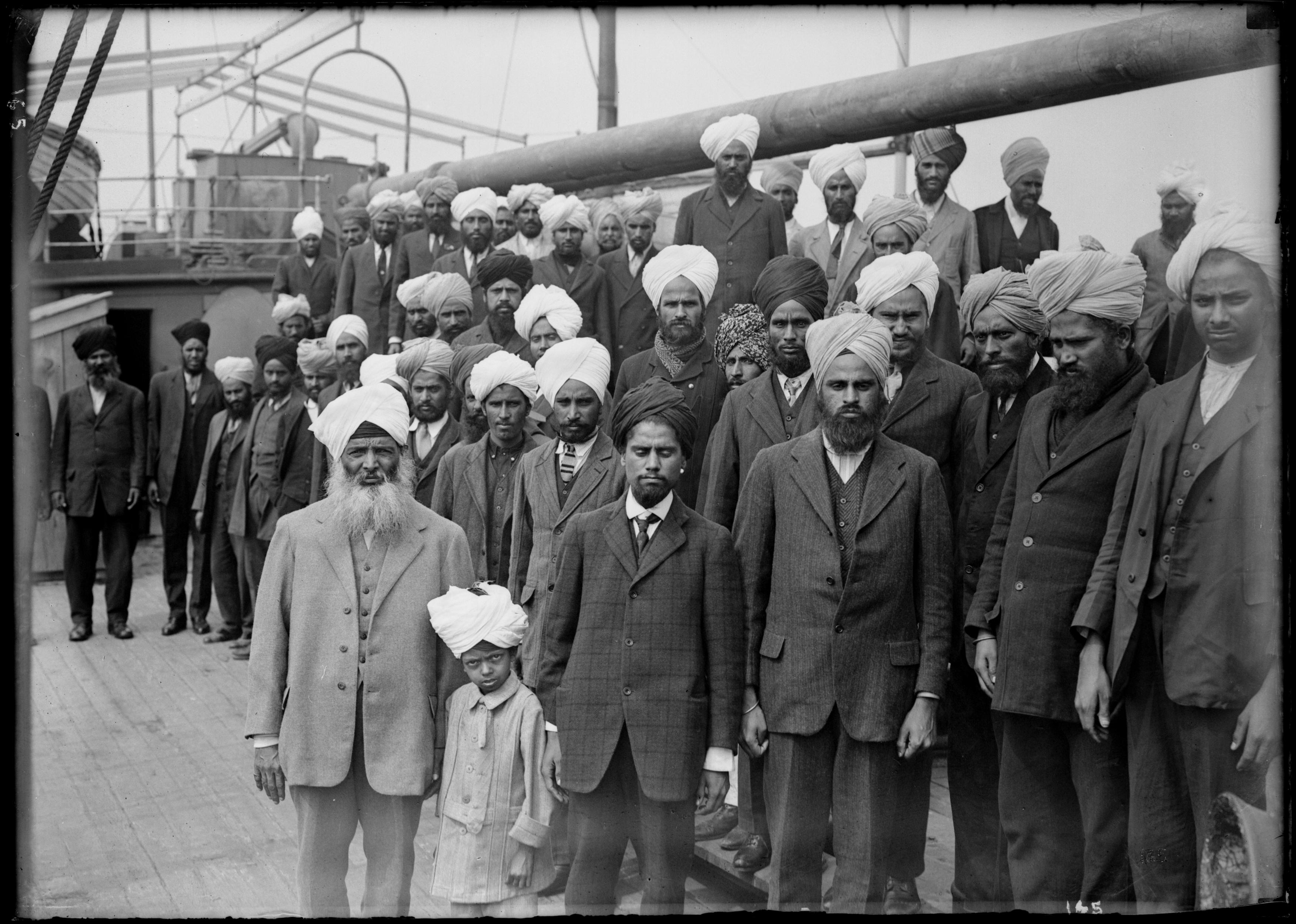
Komagata Maru incident.

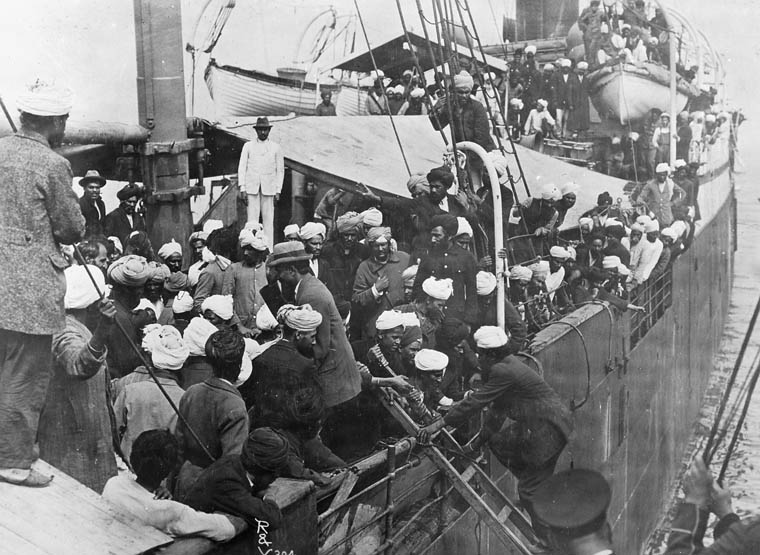
Punjabi Sikhs, Punjabi Muslims, and Punjabi Hindus on board the Komagata Maru in Vancouver, 1914.

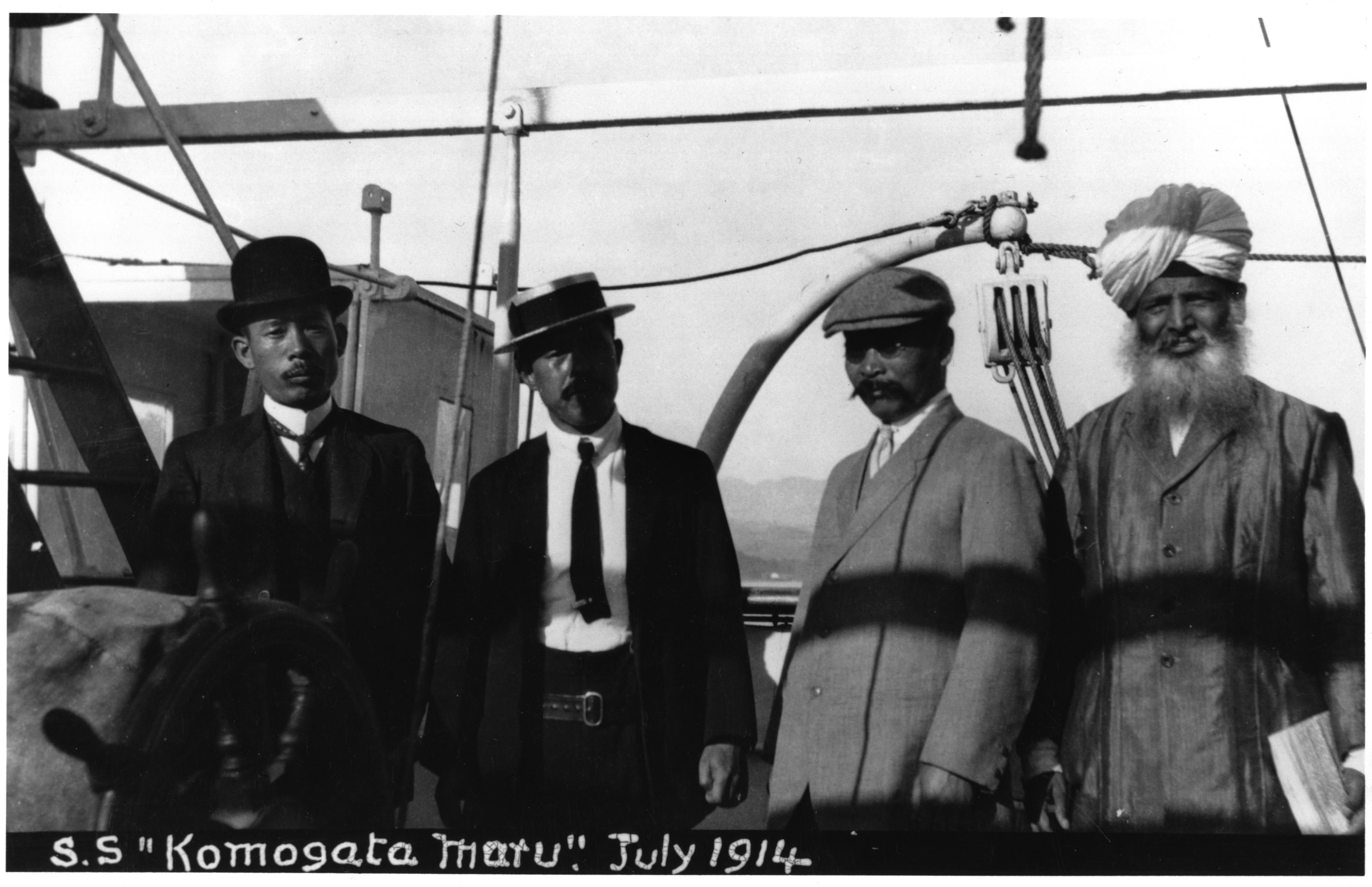
Komagata Maru incident

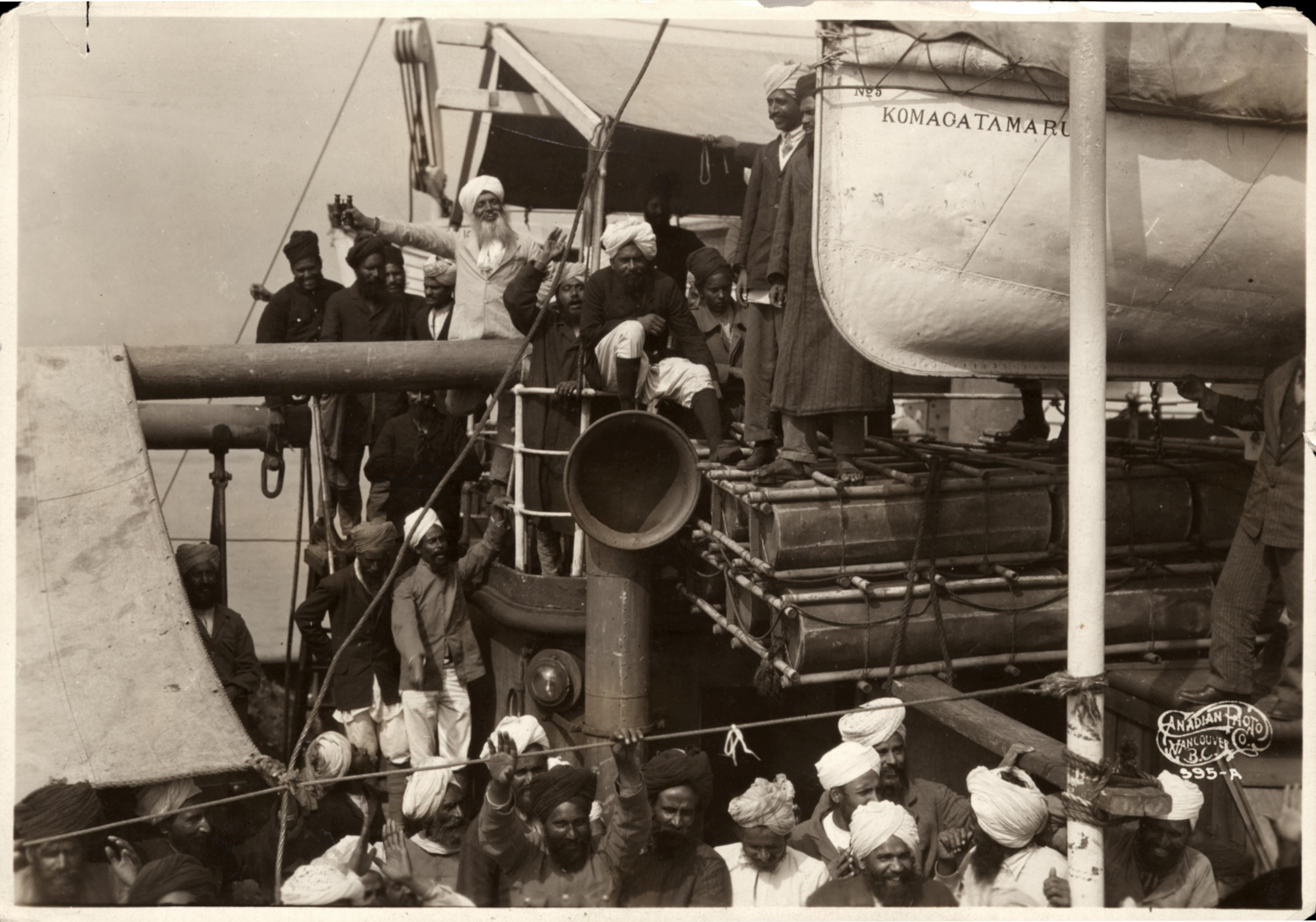
Komagata Maru incident

== See also ==
- Human rights in Canada
- Anti-Sikh sentiment in Canada
- Ukrainian Canadian internment
- Anti-German sentiment in Victoria 1914
- MS St. Louis, another vessel carrying immigrants denied entry to North America
- MV Sun Sea incident
- British protected person
- Indo-Canadians in Greater Vancouver
- Mewa Singh Lopoke

== Bibliography ==
- Ferguson, Ted, A White Man's Country (Toronto: Doubleday Canada, 1975)
- Johnston, Hugh J. M., The Voyage of the Komagata Maru: the Sikh Challenge to Canada's Colour Bar. (Delhi: Oxford University Press, 1979)
- Josh, Sohan Singh, "Tragedy of the Komagata Maru" (New Delhi: People's Publishing House, 1975)
- Kazimi, Ali, Continuous Journey, feature-length documentary about the Komagata Maru. 2004
- Kazimi, Ali (2011). Undesirables: White Canada and the Komagata Maru. Vancouver: D&M Publishers. ISBN 978-1553659730.
- McKelvie, B. A., "Magic, Murder and Mystery", (Duncan, B.C., Cowichan Leader, 1965)
- Morse, Eric Wilton. "Some Aspects of the Komagata Maru Affair." Canadian Historical Association Report (1936). p. 100-109.
- Reid, Robie L., "The Inside Story of the Komagata Maru" in British Columbia Historical Quarterly, Vol V, No. 1, January 1941, p. 4
- Report of the Komagata Maru Inquiry (Calcutta, 1914)
- Singh, Baba Gurdit, "Voyage of the Komagatamaru: or India's Slavery Abroad" (Calcutta; n.d.)
- Singh, Jaswant, "Baba Gurdit Singh: Komagatamaru" (Jullundur; New Book Co., 1965) [written in Gurmukhi]
- Singh, Kesar, Canadian Sikhs (Part One) and Komagata Maru Massacre. Surrey, B.C.: 1989.
- Singh, Malwindarjit, and Singh, Harinder, War against King Emperor: Ghadr of 1914–15: A verdict by special tribunal (Ludhiana: Bhai Sahib Randhir Singh Trust, 2001)
- Somani, Alia Rehana. "Broken Passages and Broken Promises: Reconstructing the Komagata Maru and Air India Cases" (PhD thesis) (Archive). School of Graduate and Postdoctoral Studies, University of Western Ontario, 2012.
- Ward, W. Peter, "The Komagata Maru Incident" in White Canada Forever: Popular Attitudes and Public Policy toward Orientals in British Columbia. Montreal: McGill-Queen's University Press, 2d ed., 1990, pp. 79–93
- Waraich, Malwinderjit Singh (ed.), Sidhu, Gurdev Singh (ed.), Komagata Maru: A Challenge to Colonialism Key Documents (Unistar Books, 2005)
- Whitehead, Eric, Cyclone Taylor: A Hockey Legend (Toronto; Doubleday Canada, 1977), pp. 158–163
