= Edward Bird (disambiguation) =

Edward Bird (1772–1819) was an English genre painter.

Edward Bird may also refer to:

- Eduard Bird (c. 1610–1665), English pipe maker in Amsterdam
- Edward Bird (runner) (born 2005), British distance runner
- Edward Wheler Bird (1823–1903), British civil servant and activist
- J. Edward Bird (1868–1948), Canadian lawyer
