= SS Heian Maru =

A number of steamships were named Heian Maru, including –

- SS Heian Maru (1890), a Japanese cargo ship in service 1924–26
- SS Heian Maru (1902), a Japanese cargo ship in service 1930–33
- SS Heian Maru (1917), a Japanese cargo ship in service 1917–45 or later
