= Guru Nanak Jahaz =

- Directed by: Sharan Art
- Written by: Harnavbir Singh
- Produced by: Manpreet Singh Johol
- Starring: Tarsem Jassar; Gurpreet Ghuggi; Harsharan Singh
- Cinematography: Jaype Singh
- Release date: 1 May 2025
- Running time: 142 minutes
- Country: India
- Language: Punjabi
- Box office: $1.3 million

Guru Nanak Jahaz is a 2025 Indian historical drama film directed by Sharan Arts. The film stars Tarsem Jassar as Mewa Singh Lopoke, Gurpreet Ghuggi as Baba Gurdit Singh and Harsharan Singh as Bhai Bhag Singh Bhikhiwind. The film is directed by Sharan Art.

Named after the Punjab name for Komagata Maru, the film revolves around the historic events of the Komagata Maru incident and the involvement of Ghadar party revolutionaries, members of a political movement founded by expatriate Indians to overthrow British rule in India, featuring the political violence of Mewa Singh Lopoke who assassinated William Hopkinson, played by Edward Sonnenblick.

== Cast ==
- Tarsem Jassar as Mewa Singh Lopoke
- Gurpreet Ghuggi as Baba Gurdit Singh
- Harsharan Singh as Bhai Bhagh Singh Bhikhiwind
- Edward Sonnenblick as William Hopkinson
- Mark Bennington as Malcolm Reid
- Bharat Bharial as Ratan Lal
- Jimmy James Burke as John Mulligan
- Hardeep S Mann as Mansa Singh
- David C. Jones as J. Edward Bird
- Fabian Novell as Thomas Walker
- Balwinder Bullet as Daljit Singh
- Malkiat Meet as Harnam Singh
- Amritpal Singh as Mit Singh Pandori
- Bhavkhandan Singh Rakhra as Dada Ji

== Reception ==
Sukhpreet Kahlon of The Indian Express gave the film four out of five, writing, "The strongest suit of the film undoubtedly is its art direction, costume and set design that create a visually cohesive historical atmosphere for the unfolding of the story. The sepia tint, muted colours, hair and make-up, draw from photographs of the incident to faithfully reproduce it on the big screen. Different Punjabi accents capture the diversity of the passengers from various parts of undivided Punjab and it is these nuances that make the film stand out."

Gurnaaz of The Tribune gave the film two and a half out of five, praising the performances, direction and cinematography but criticising the pace, writing that the "film moves at a slow pace, and some scenes feel stretched and tend to get boring. But, thankfully, the message is not lost."
