= Baba Gurdit Singh =

Indian revolutionary

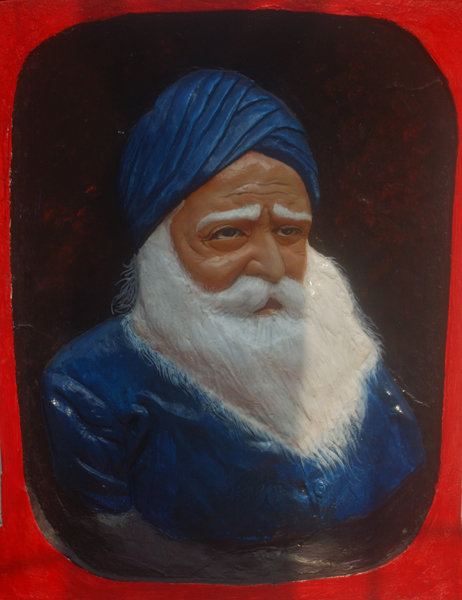
- Painting of Gurdit Singh
- Born: 1877; Sarhali, Punjab, British India
- Died: 1954 (aged 76–77); Amritsar, Punjab, India
- Occupations: Entrepreneur, nationalist, community leader
- Known for: Organising the Komagata Maru incident (1914)
- Movement: Indian independence movement

Baba Gurdit Singh (1877 – 1954) was an Indian Sikh entrepreneur and nationalist. He is known for organising the 1914 Komagata Maru voyage, a landmark event in the struggle against racial discrimination.

Born in Sarhali, Punjab, he chartered the Japanese steamship Komagata Maru to transport 376 Indian passengers to Canada, directly challenging the country’s exclusionary immigration laws. The incident drew international attention to the injustices of colonial policies and inspired nationalist movements in India. After years in exile, Singh surrendered to British authorities in 1922 and was imprisoned, later becoming a respected figure in the Sikh community. He spent his final years in Amritsar, where he died in 1954.

== Early years ==
His grandfather, Sardar Rattan Singh was a high-ranking military officer in the Sikh Khalsa Army and had fought against the British during the First and Second Anglo-Sikh Wars. He declined the British offer of a jagir after the annexation of the Punjab. Later on, his father Sardar Hukam Singh went to Malaya where he settled down as a contractor.

=== Education ===
Gurdit Singh received little education in his childhood, partly due to the harsh treatment of his teacher which caused him to leave school. However, at the age of 13, he privately acquired elementary education so as to be able to correspond with his father in Malaya.

=== British Malaya ===
Gurdit Singh visited Malaya in about 1885 and conducted business in Singapore and Malaya as a contractor. He returned from there in 1909. In 1911 he raised his voice against begar (a form of forced labour). He wrote to the government complaining against officials who forced poor villagers to work for them without remuneration, and when he received no response, he exhorted the people of his village to refuse to be subjected to begar.

== Legacy ==
A well-to-do fisherman in Singapore, Gurdit Singh chartered a Japanese ship, the Komagata Maru, in 1914 to go to Canada, with the aim of helping his compatriots whose journeys to Canada were being blocked. The government of Canada had put restrictions on the entry of Indians.

The ship had a total of 376 passengers out of whom 351 were Sikhs and 21 Punjabi Muslims. The ship sailed from Hong Kong to Vancouver on 3 April 1914. The obstructions put up by the alien authorities and the hardships faced by its passengers turned them into staunch nationalists. The ship reached Vancouver on 22 May 1914, it was not allowed to anchor and was attacked by the police at night. The attack was repulsed by the passengers and it created a great stir among the Indians in Canada. This is known as the Komagata Maru incident.

An agreement was reached and the ship sailed back to India. It reached Calcutta on 29 September 1914. However, the passengers were not allowed to enter Calcutta; they were rather ordered to board a Punjab-bound train especially arranged for the purpose. They refused to do so and many of the passengers were killed, though a great many escaped.

Gurdit Singh was aware of the problems that Punjabis were facing in getting to Canada due to exclusion laws. He was apparently also aware of the January 1914 regulations when he chartered the Komagata Maru, with the purported goal of challenging the continuous journey regulation and opening the door for immigration from India to Canada. He believed he could circumvent this law by hiring a boat to sail from Calcutta to Vancouver.

At the same time, in January 1914, he publicly espoused the Ghadarite cause while in Hong Kong. The Ghadar Party was an organisation founded by Indians of the United States and Canada in June 1913 with the aim of liberating India from British rule. It was also known as the Hindi Association of the Pacific Coast.

== Later years ==
Singh escaped and remained underground for many years until 1920 when, on the advice of Mahatma Gandhi, he made a voluntary surrender at Nankana Sahib and was imprisoned for five years. Later, he settled in Calcutta.

In 1937 Pratap Singh Kairon, the future Chief Minister Punjab and then an Akali nominee, entered the Punjab Legislative Assembly, defeating the Congress candidate, Baba Gurdit Singh of Sarhali.

Singh died on 24 July 1954, in Amritsar and was cremated at his native village Sarhali Kalan, Tarn taran. Baba Gurdit Singh left behind one son, Baba Balwant Singh.

== Films ==
A movie named as Guru Nanak Jahaz on his life was made with Gurpreet Ghuggi in lead role of Baba Gurdit Singh. The film was released on 1 May 2025 on life of Mewa Singh Lopoke and his role in Ghaderite movement and whole incidents surrounding the Komagata Maru ship as well as incidents that happened surrounding Baba Gurdit Singh.
