= Edward Sonnenblick =

American actor working in India

- Born: 27 June 1980 (age 45); United States
- Occupation: Actor • Host
- Years active: 2008–present
- Spouse: Sonal Mehta (m. 2009)
- Children: 1

Edward Sonnenblick (born 27 June 1980) is an American actor who works in Hindi films and television shows. He has starred in works such as Firangi (2017), Veere Di Wedding (2018), Manikarnika: The Queen of Jhansi (2019), Kesari (2019), and RRR (2022).

== Early life and career ==
Edward Sonnenblick was born in Southern California and grew up in San Francisco, United States. He graduated from California State Polytechnic University, Humboldt (prior to 2024 known as 'Humboldt State University') with a BS degree in botany. Later, he worked as a natural foods chef in Northern California for 15 years.

Sonnenblick learnt Hindi and moved to Mumbai to seek his fortune as an actor. Sonnenblick was inspired by the 2001 Hindi film Lagaan. He visited India in 2005 for a two-week course at the Vipassana International Academy in Igatpuri, Nashik. He went on to play the double role of evil British twin brothers in Jhansi Ki Rani. Sonnenblick was the host of the serial Indipedia on Epic channel in 2017. He has worked in films like Manikarnika: The Queen of Jhansi, Veere Di Wedding, and RRR.

== Personal life ==
Sonnenblick is married to Sonal Mehta, a freelance creative director in June 2009, whom he met a year back. The couple have a son.

== Filmography ==
- All films are in Hindi, unless mentioned.

Key
†	Denotes films that have not yet been released

Year	Title	Role	Language	Notes
2008	Dostana	Magazine Editor	Hindi	
2010	Badmaash Company	Stock Broker	Hindi	
2010	Anjaana Anjaani	Emmanuel	Hindi	
2011	Yamla Pagla Deewana	Bobji	Hindi	
2011	Game	Forensic Pathologist	Hindi	
2011	Dum Maaro Dum	Shooter at Fleamarket	Hindi	
2011	Gajaar: Journey of the Soul	Eric	Marathi	
2011	Rajanna	Governor Curzon	Telugu	
2012	Shirdi Sai	Collector	Telugu	
2012	Chittagong	Col. Tait	Hindi	
2016	Neerja	Captain Jack Snipes	Hindi	
2016	Kapoor & Sons	Dan	Hindi	
2017	Rangoon	Officer	Hindi	
2017	Raag Desh	Lt. Col Kitson	Hindi	
2017	Firangi	Mark Daniels	Hindi	
2018	Veere Di Wedding	John Stinson	Hindi	
2018	Sandhya Chaya	Richard	Hindi	TV film
2019	Manikarnika: The Queen of Jhansi	Captain Gordon	Hindi	
2019	Kesari	Lt. Lawrence	Hindi	
2020	Saving Chintu	Oliver	English	Short film
2020	Papoo Photowalah	Peter	Hindi	
2022	RRR	Edward	Telugu	
2023	Tiger 3	Dr. Hoffman	Hindi	
2023	Sam Bahadur	Lord Mountbatten	Hindi	
2023	Devil: The British Secret Agent	Bell	Telugu	
2024	Captain Miller	General Andrew Wandy	Tamil	
2024	Maharaj	Justice Sausse	Hindi	
2025	Aghathiyaa	Edwin Duplex	Tamil	
2025	Champion	Roy	Telugu	
2025	Guru Nanak Jahaz	William C. Hopkinson	Punjabi	

=== Television ===
Year	Title	Role	Network	Notes
2009	Jhansi Ki Rani	James Manson	Zee TV	
2012	Fear Files	Dr. Morris	Zee TV	1 episode
2015	Stories by Rabindranath Tagore	Unknown Character		2 episodes
2017	Inside Edge	Hamish McCall	Amazon Prime Video	10 episodes
2017	Bose: Dead/Alive	Stanley Allen	ALT Balaji	9 episodes
2017	Indipedia	Self		15 episodes
2019	The Insiders	Chandika's Brother		2 episodes
2019	The Kapil Sharma Show	Robert Paswan	Sony Entertainment Television	6 episodes
2023	Jubilee	Vladimir Sayadyants	Amazon Prime Video	
2025	Black, White & Gray - Love Kills	Daniel Gray	SonyLIV	
2025	Mandala Murders	Robert MacCauley	Netflix	
