= Continuous journey regulation =

Canadian immigration policy (1908–1947)

The continuous journey regulation was a restriction placed by the Canadian government that (ostensibly) prevented those who, "in the opinion of the Minister of the Interior", did not "come from the country of their birth or citizenship by a continuous journey and or through tickets purchased before leaving the country of their birth or nationality" from being accepted as immigrants to Canada. However, in effect, the regulation affected only the immigration of persons from India.

Issued through an order-in-council on 8 January 1908, the regulation was the first attempt by the Government of Canadian to restrict immigration. In practice, the regulation applied only to ships that began their voyage in India, as the great distance usually necessitated a stopover in Japan or Hawaii. These regulations came at a time when Canada was accepting massive numbers of immigrants (over 400,000 in 1913 alone), almost all of whom came from Europe.

== History ==
=== Background ===
During the first two decades of the 20th century, some provinces in Canada enacted laws limiting the civil rights of Indians, including the right to vote, hold public office, (Note: As per Section 14 of Municipal Clauses Act, 1906 (S.B.C. 1906, c. 32), candidates applying for the position of Mayor or Aldermen should be a British subject, older than 21 years, and should be a registered land-owner.) serve on juries, (Note: As per Jurors' Act 1883, only legally registered voters are qualified to become jurors. At the time, Qualifications and Registrations of Voters Provisions Act, 1875 was in force, which barred Chinese and Indians from voting in Provincial Elections.) obtain a liquor licence, or practise as pharmacists, lawyers, and accountants. However, because India, like Canada, was part of the British Empire, Canadian authorities did not pass exclusion laws explicitly targeting those of Indian origin. The Imperial authorities in London had noted Indian resentment when Australia enacted immigration restrictions implicitly designed to restrict non-European immigration in 1901, based on similar legislation in South Africa. New Zealand had passed similar restrictive legislation in 1899.

When Canada started making provisions to block immigration from India, London warned it to be cautious in its approach and to be aware that its actions might inflame nationalist fervour in India. With this in mind, Canadian immigration authorities decided to indirectly halt Indian immigration to the country.

=== Continuous journey regulation ===
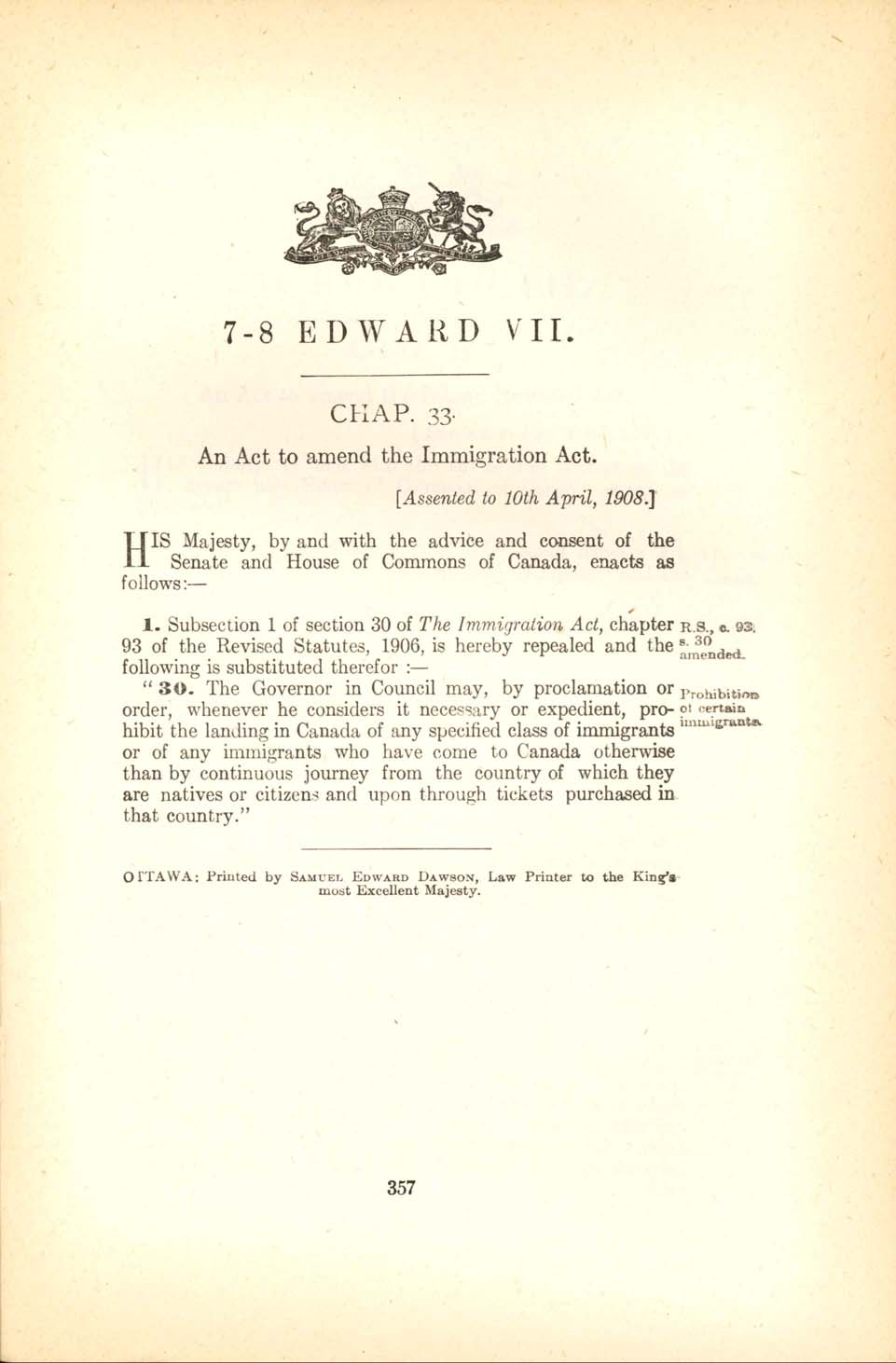
Original Statute of Continuous Journey Regulation

The government's first attempt to restrict immigration from India was to issue an order-in-council on 8 January 1908 that prohibited the immigration of persons who "in the opinion of the Minister of the Interior" did not "come from the country of their birth or citizenship by a continuous journey and or through tickets purchased before leaving the country of their birth or nationality." In practice, this applied only to ships that began their voyage in India, as the great distance usually necessitated a stopover in Japan or Hawaii. This was discriminatory to Indians who could not travel directly to Canada.

The new regulation was soon challenged with the arrival of the S.S. Monteagle in British Columbia in late February 1908. The ship carried more than 200 passengers, 105 of whom had boarded in Calcutta. A number of the passengers were ordered deported as they did not comply with the new regulation. The orders were challenged in court. Justice Clement of the Supreme Court of B.C. quashed the deportation orders on 24 March 1908, after he found the regulation to be invalid, as the Immigration Act did not authorize the delegation of decision making to the Minister of the Interior, as stated in the regulation.

=== Impact of the continuous journey regulation ===
The government responded by introducing an amendment to the Immigration Act, which expressly authorized a regulation "to prohibit the landing of any specified class of immigrants or any immigrants who have come to Canada otherwise than by continuous journey from the country of which they are natives or citizens and upon through tickets purchased in that country."

The amendment was enacted on 10 April 1908. The government issued an order-in-council under the amended act on 27 May 1908. Further regulation was issued by an order-in-council on 3 June 1908, which stated that

No immigrant of Asiatic origin shall be permitted to enter Canada unless in actual and personal possession in his or her own right of two hundred dollars unless such person is a native or subject of an Asiatic country in regard to which special statutory regulations are in force or with which the Government of Canada has made a special treaty, agreement or convention.

While neither regulation expressly referred to India, they effectively stopped immigration from India as the $200 cash requirement limit was a significant hurdle for most potential immigrants from India, and the continuous journey regulation was made effective by pressuring steamship companies not to provide direct service between Canada and India or to sell through tickets from Indian ports.

Canadian Pacific did run a very lucrative shipping line between Vancouver and Calcutta. However, the Canadian government forced the company to stop this service. It was now impossible to come via a continuous journey to Canada.

A new, revised Immigration Act was enacted on 4 May 1910. It included provisions similar, though not the same as provisions in the 1906 act, which authorized the continuous journey and $200 cash requirement regulations. The two 1908 regulations were reissued on 9 May 1910, by orders-in-council P.C. 920, P.C. 924, and P.C. 926.

=== Court ruling continuous journey regulation as invalid ===
The continuous journey regulation came under judicial review in 1911, in a case before the Supreme Court of B.C. involving Hussain Rahim, a known revolutionary from Bengal, India. On 9 November 1911, Justice Morrison issued a writ of habeas corpus to quash a deportation order made against Rahim. In granting the order, the judge commented that the 1910 continuous journey regulation was invalid, as its wording (copied from the 1908 regulation) did not conform with the enacting provision of Paragraph 38(a) of the 1910 Immigration Act.

The judgement did not result in any significant increase in attempts at immigration from India. Both regulations underwent judicial scrutiny again in November 1913, in the course of two cases before the Supreme Court of B.C. The first involved Bhagwan Singh Jakh, a known revolutionary from Punjab, India, who had entered Canada by falsely representing that he was a returning resident of Canada. The second case involved 39 passengers from India who arrived in Victoria, BC, on 17 October 1913, on the ship Panama Maru, and who were detained and ordered deported under the Immigration Act.

While court proceedings were still pending, Jakh was forcefully deported on 19 November 1913, in the face of a writ of habeas corpus issued by the Supreme Court of B.C. On 28 November 1913, Justice Hunter quashed the deportation orders made against 35 of the 39 passengers (applications concerning four passengers were withdrawn when the case was heard), by finding that: (a) the $200 cash requirement regulation was invalid as its reference to "Asiatic origin" did not conform with Section 37 of the 1910 Act, which authorized regulations in respect of persons of the "Asiatic race;" and (b) the continuous journey regulation was invalid for the reasons given by Justice Morrison in the Rahim case.

Word of Justice Hunter's decision spread abroad, with Indian residents in Canada urging others to come to Canada before the rules were changed again.

The federal government's continuous-journey provision remained law until 1947, as did most BC anti-South Asian legislation. Because of community pressure and representations by the government of India, Canada allowed the wives and dependent children of South Asian Canadian residents to immigrate in 1919, and by the mid-1920s a small flow of wives and children had been established. This did not counter the effect of migration by South Asian Canadians to India and the US, which by the mid-1920s had reduced the South Asian population in Canada to about 1300.

=== Legislative countermeasures ===
As an appeal from Justice Hunter's decision was limited by law, the government responded quickly, by issuing new continuous journey and $200 cash requirement regulations on 7 January 1914, by orders-in-council P.C. 23 and P.C. 24. The new regulations conformed with the authorizing provisions in the 1910 act, in accordance with Justice Hunter's decision. The new regulations appeared to be immune from any further legal challenge. P.C. 24 was repealed on 25 July 1921, with the approval of order-in-council P.C. 2668, while P.C. 23 was revoked much later on 26 November 1947.

== Komagata Maru incident ==
Gurdit Singh Sandhu, from Amritsar, was a well-to-do government contractor in Singapore who was aware of the problems that Indians were facing in getting to Canada due to exclusion laws. Though Singh was apparently aware of the January 1914 regulations when he chartered the SS Komagata Maru, he continued with his purported goal of challenging the continuous journey regulation and opening the door for immigration from India to Canada. The passengers consisted of 340 Sikhs, 24 Muslims, and 12 Hindus, all British subjects.

When the Komagata Maru arrived in Canadian waters, it was not allowed to dock. The government mobilized HMCS Rainbow, a former Royal Navy ship under the command of Commander Hose, with troops from the 11th Regiment Irish Fusiliers of Canada, 72nd Regiment "Seaforth Highlanders of Canada", and the 6th Regiment "The Duke of Connaught's Own Rifles". In the end, only 24 passengers were admitted to Canada, since the ship had violated the exclusion laws, the passengers did not have the required funds, and they had not sailed directly from India. The ship was turned around and forced to depart on July 23 for Asia.

The Komagata Maru incident was widely cited at the time by Indian groups to highlight discrepancies in Canadian immigration laws. Further, the inflamed passions in the wake of the incident were widely cultivated by the Indian revolutionary organization, the Ghadar Party, to rally support for its aims.

=== Governmental apologies ===
In response to calls for the government of Canada to address historic wrongs involving immigration and wartime measures, the Conservative government in 2006 created the community historical recognition program to provide grant and contribution funding for community projects linked to wartime measures and immigration restrictions and a national historical recognition program to fund federal initiatives, developed in partnership with various groups. The announcement was made on 23 June 2006, at the time Prime Minister Harper apologized in the House of Commons for the head tax against Chinese immigrants.

On 23 May 2008, the Legislative Assembly of British Columbia unanimously passed a resolution that:

[The BC Legislature] apologizes for the events of May 23, 1914, when 376 passengers of the Komagata Maru, stationed off Vancouver harbour, were denied entry by Canada. The House deeply regrets that the passengers, who sought refuge in our country and our province, were turned away without the benefit of the fair and impartial treatment befitting a society where people of all cultures are welcomed and accepted.

On 3 August 2008, Prime Minister Stephen Harper appeared at the 13th annual Ghadri Babiyan Da Mela (festival) in Surrey, BC, to issue an apology for the Komagata Maru incident. He said, in response to the House of Commons motion calling for an apology by the government, "On behalf of the government of Canada, I am officially conveying as prime minister that apology."

Some members of the Sikh community were unsatisfied with the apology as they expected it to be made in Parliament. Minister of Citizenship and Immigration Jason Kenney said, "The apology has been given and it won't be repeated", thus settling the matter for the federal government.

The dissatisfaction with Harper's 2008 apology was communicated to the federal government through individual members and groups of the Indo-Canadian community, such as The Descendants of the Komagata Maru Society. Finally, on May 18, 2016, Prime Minister Justin Trudeau gave a formal "full apology" for the incident in the House of Commons.

Further lobbying by Raj Singh Toor (whose grandfather Baba Puran Singh Janetpura was a passenger on the Komagata Maru) led to the 18 May 2021 apology from Vancouver City Council "...for the role the City played in the incident, especially supporting laws that prevented passengers from disembarking". As well, Toor's lobbying brought about an apology from New Westminster City Council on 27 September 2021, with the council stating "The City of New Westminster formally apologizes to the South Asian community and the descendants of the survivors of the Komagata Maru for its past actions which resulted in discrimination and exclusion."

== See also ==
- Head tax (Canada)
- Human rights in Canada
- Komagata Maru incident
