= Black, White & Gray - Love Kills =

Indian crime thriller web series

- Genre: Crime thriller Mockumentary
- Written by: Pushkar Sunil Mahabal Adarsh Swaroop; Yogendra Oke
- Directed by: Pushkar Sunil Mahabal
- Starring: Mayur More; Palak Jaiswal; Hakkim Shahjahan; Deven Bhojani; Tigmanshu Dhulia
- Music by: Meghdeep Bose
- Country of origin: India
- Original language: Hindi
- No. of seasons: 1
- No. of episodes: 6

Production
- Executive producers: Saugata Mukherjee; Anujeet Ghatak
- Producers: Swaroop Sampat; Hemal Thakkar
- Cinematography: Saee Bhope
- Editor: Pushkar Sunil Mahabal
- Production company: Playtime Creation

Original release
- Network: SonyLIV
- Release: 2 May 2025

Black, White & Gray – Love Kills is a 2025 Hindi-language Indian Mockumentary Crime thriller web series streaming on SonyLIV. It is directed by Pushkar Sunil Mahabal and produced by Swaroop Sampat and Hemal Thakkar.

It stars Mayur More, Palak Jaiswal, Hakkim Shahjahan, Deven Bhojani, Tigmanshu Dhulia and the series is released on 2 May 2025.

== Synopsis ==
In a world where love can be lethal, a string of high-profile murders unravels into a tangled web of forbidden desires and betrayal. As the investigation deepens, it becomes clear — the truth does not come in black or white, but in dangerous shades of grey.

== Cast ==
- Mayur More as The Accused
- Palak Jaiswal as The Girl
- Tigmanshu Dhulia as Officer Chauhan
- Deven Bhojani as Rao
- Hakkim Shahjahan as Sunny
- Edward Sonnenblick as Daniel Gray
- Kamlesh Sawant
- Anant Jog
- Kavita Ghai
- Jairoop Jeevan
- Nishant Shamaskar
- Abhishek Bhalerao
- Singh Rajni
- Abhinav Gupta
- Isha Mate
- Sanjay Kumar Sahu

== Release ==
It is released on 2 May 2025.

== Reception ==
Shubhra Gupta of The Indian Express gave 3 stars out of 5 and wrote that "Patriarchy, parental opposition, class differences, power structures, are all present in this crime drama, reminding you of several others that have come before." Mayur Sanap of Rediff.com also gave 3 stars out 5 and observed that "Black, White & Gray - Love Kills has a unique take on the standard murder mystery that may not be perfect but is very entertaining nonetheless" Archika Khurana of The Times of India rated 3.5/5 stars and said "With its smart mockumentary format and sociopolitical depth, Black, White & Gray—Love Kills is an engrossing watch that provokes reflection as much as it entertains."

Anisha Rao of India Today said in her review that "'Black, White and Grey - Love Kills' is a mind game. It lures you in with its true-crime coat, then punches you in the gut with emotional depth and masterful storytelling. It's fiction, yes, but it'll haunt you like a cold case you never solved." Arpita Sarkar of OTT Play rated it 2.5/5 stars and said, "The crime thriller series starts well with the gripping plot, however, it loses its thrill in the middle. Meanwhile, Mayur More's acting is praiseworthy." Sonal Pandya of Times Now gave 3 stars out of 5 and commented that "Writer-director Pushkar Mahabal creates a fictional documentary approach to a crime, and viewers watch as it spirals out of control. It is a gripping crime thriller with interesting take on standard mystery.

Rahul Desai of The Hollywood Reporter India writes in his review that "The six-episode series is an inventive subversion of true-crime storytelling. Most docudramas are so preoccupied with showing (rather than suggesting) that they forget to read between the very lines they endorse. They adopt the glamour and distractions of fiction, the politics and insinuations of mythmaking. Everyone seems to be playing a role, including the makers who use creative ambiguity as an excuse for moral ambivalence. But once in a while, an audacious series like Black, White & Gray comes along and breaks the fourth wall." Nandini Ramnath of Scroll.in observed that "Black, White & Gray is intense and involving for the most part, unpeeling its many layers with dexterity. The performances are excellent."

Vinamra Mathur og Firstpost rated 3/5 stars and said "The most nifty aspect of Black White And Gray Love Kills is how it stays true to the essence of the blueprint of a skillful thriller". Troy Ribeiro of Free Press Journal gave 3 stars out of 5 and writes, "Is it perfect? Hardly. But perhaps slickness would have diluted its rage. In an era of algorithm-massaged narratives, this series dares to stay messy, raw, and defiantly uncomfortable—like the truths it seeks to unearth."
