= Gruppa krovi (film) =

Blood Type
- Directed by: Maksim Brius
- Written by: Mariya Oshmyanskaya; Aleksandr Ivanov; Aleksandr Paygalik; Mariya Khromova
- Produced by: Sergei Shcheglov; Inessa Yurchenko; Aleksandr Zharov
- Starring: Andrey Rudyka; Eva Williams; Mark Aleksandrov; Lyudmila Yulova; Roman Romanovsky; Artemy Voskresensky; Daniil Rubashevsky
- Cinematography: Stanislav Mikhailov
- Edited by: Vitaly Vinogradov
- Music by: Vitaly Mukanyaev
- Production companies: 3xMedia; Gazprom-Media; Cinema Fund
- Distributed by: Central Partnership
- Release date: May 8, 2025 (Russia)
- Running time: 90 minutes
- Country: Russia
- Language: Russian
- Budget: ₽231 million
- Box office: ₽137 million

Blood Type (Russian: Группа крови, romanized: Gruppa krovi, lit. 'Blood Type') is a 2025 Russian war drama film directed by Maksim Brius about the tragic fate of children in Nazi concentration camps in the Leningrad region in 1943, where orphans were not only subjected to hunger and grueling labor but were also used as blood donors.

This film was theatrically released in Russia on May 8, 2025, by Central Partnership.

== Plot ==
The film takes place in November 1943. The Nazis brought another batch of Soviet orphans to the Vyritsa orphanage, where cold, hunger, and forced labor reign. The Nazis use the children as blood donors for wounded German soldiers. Nevertheless, the children find the strength to resist.

== Cast ==
- Andrey Rudyka as Vitek in childhood
- Eva Williams as Tonya Gracheva in childhood
- Mark Aleksandrov as Grishka in childhood
- Lyudmila Yulova as Veta in childhood
- Roman Romanovsky
- Artemy Voskresensky as Lyokha in childhood
- Daniil Rubashevsky as Styopka the Fireman in childhood
- Karina Andolenko as Kokoshkina
- Petar Zekavica as Fabro
- Alexey Nilov as Elder Seraphim
- Leonid Gromov as Gerasim Ivanovich
- Xenia Popova-Pendereckaya as Inga
- Ekaterina Domashchenko as Natalya Pryakhina
- Sergey Zharkov as Lieutenant Livanov
- Tatyana Rasskazova as Elena Ershovskaya
- Anna Dyukova as Nadezhda Zubareva
- Vadim Skvirsky as Paul Ditmar

== Production ==
The creation of the films Blood Type was carried out by the 3xMedia company with the support of the Cinema Foundation. The production was organized by producers Inessa Yurchenko and Sergei Shcheglov.

=== Filming ===
Filming took place in Saint Petersburg and the Leningrad Oblast.

== Release ==
The premiere of the project, dedicated to the 80th anniversary of the Great Victory, is scheduled for May 8, 2025.
