= William C. Hopkinson =

Indian police officer (1880–1914)

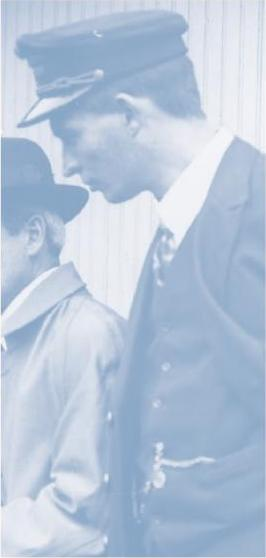
Detail of Canadian immigration officer William Charles Hopkinson from a photograph of him and other officials meeting with reporters during Komagata Maru crisis, 1914

William Charles Hopkinson (16 June 1880 – 21 October 1914) was an Anglo-Canadian who served as an Indian police officer and later an immigration inspector in the Canadian Immigration Branch in Vancouver, British Columbia, who is noted for his role in infiltration and intelligence on the Ghadarite movement in North America in the early 1900s.

== Early life ==
Hopkinson was born in Delhi on 16 June 1880. His father, William Hopkinson, was then a sergeant instructor of volunteers at Allahabad. His mother, Agnes Hopkinson, may have been an Indian woman, who used a European name. Raised in India, he spoke Hindi, but did not speak Punjabi well. He turned to others for translation of materials written in the Gurmukhi script.

== Intelligence work ==
In 1903 or 1904, he became an inspector of police in Calcutta. Hopkinson came to Canada in late 1907 or early 1908, officially on leave, but pursuing investigations for the Criminal Intelligence Department in India.

In February 1909, he was hired by the Immigration Branch (part of the Department of the Interior), as an immigration inspector and interpreter. He later became chief assistant to the Canadian inspector of immigration. Hopkinson continued to work for the police in India. He reported to the deputy minister of the Interior in Ottawa and to J. A. Wallinger, Agent of the Government of India in London. He was also retained by the U.S. immigration service.

By 1910 Hopkinson was actively involved in monitoring the Indian immigration and the nationalistic separatist opinions and outlets in North America, especially Canada, and was the principal agent responsible for comprehensive British intelligence in the Pacific coast.

He openly attended public meetings in British Columbia and down the coast in Washington, Oregon and California, to gather information on Indian nationalists and separatists. He used a network of assets to provide additional information on various terrorist and separatist groups. During that time he was subjected to accusations of bribery and to threats by the objects of his intelligence work, although it has been stated that in fact this was done due to his refusal to accept bribes or to be threatened by these subjects. Hopkinson was successful in infiltrating the Ghadarite movement after its conception, and in 1914 he was involved in the Komagata Maru incident.

== Komagata Maru incident and aftermath ==
During the incident, he acted as an interpreter for the Immigration Branch when passengers were questioned.

In mid-July, 1914, prior to the departure of the Komagata Maru, a local Ghadarite, Mewa Singh, was arrested while re-entering Canada from Sumas, Washington, attempting to bring weapons into Canada. Hopkinson helped to secure his release with a minor fine.

On 31 August 1914, one of Hopkinson's informants, Harnam Singh, was found murdered in Vancouver. On 3 September, another informant, Arjan Singh, was shot dead in Vancouver. On 5 September, another informant, Bela Singh, was arrested and subsequently charged with murder for killing two local Ghaderites, in what he claimed was self-defence.

== Death ==
On 21 October 1914, Hopkinson attended the provincial courthouse on West Georgia Street in Vancouver. He was there to testify at Bela Singh's murder trial, where he was expected to give evidence concerning threats made against Bela Singh, including death threats made by one of the victims. While waiting outside a courtroom, Hopkinson was assassinated by Mewa Singh.

After shooting inspector Hopkinson, Bhai Mewa Singh surrendered to the authorities and was put on trial for the murder. The presiding judge found him guilty of killing an inspector and sentenced him to death. Mewa Singh was executed by hanging at the New Westminster jail on 11 January 1915.

== Bibliography ==
- Campbell, Peter (1999), East Meets Left: South Asian Militants and the Socialist Party of Canada in British Columbia,1904-1914.Vol 20, Autumn 1999. p 35-66, International Council for Canadian Studies
- Jensen, Joan M (1979), "The "Hindu Conspiracy": A Reassessment. The Pacific Historical Review, Vol. 48, No. 1. (Feb., 1979), pp. 65-83", Pacific Historical Review, University of California Press, ISSN 0030-8684.
- Johnson, Hugh J M (1979), The Voyage of the Komagata Maru: The Sikh Challenge to Canada's Colour Bar., University of British Columbia Press, ISBN 0-7748-0340-1.
- Popplewell, Richard J (1995), Intelligence and Imperial Defence: British Intelligence and the Defence of the Indian Empire 1904-1924., Routledge, ISBN 0-7146-4580-X.
- Puri, Harish K (1980), "Revolutionary Organization: A Study of the Ghadar Movement. Social Scientist, Vol. 9, No. 2/3. (Sep.–Oct., 1980), pp. 53-66", Social Scientist, doi:10.2307/3516925, ISSN 0970-0293, JSTOR 3516925.
