= J. Edward Bird =

Canadian lawyer (1868–1948)

Joseph Edward Bird (July 16, 1868 – 1948) was a Canadian legal figure. Bird was the primary lawyer, hired by the Khalsa Diwan Society to represent the passengers on board the Komagata Maru in Vancouver, 1914. Bird fought actively against the threat of his clients' eventual deportation, and he made great effort to challenge Canada's highly restrictive immigration laws. Bird was an advocate for equality, and sought to reform the race-based exclusion laws in Canada. Bird attempted to prove that the passengers of the Komagata Maru should have been able to settle in Canada as British subjects, though he was ultimately unsuccessful; public and political sentiments and policies at the time were overtly racist, and the BC Court of Appeal ordered the Komagata Maru to return to India.

== Early life and background ==
Born on July 16, 1868, and raised in Barrie, Ontario, on Lake Simcoe, Bird's lineage is Canadian dating back many generations, with a distant Irish past. His mother was Elizabeth Bird, and his father was Henry Bird, a prominent citizen of Barrie who worked as a treasurer and clerk for the municipality of Barrie.

Though Barrie had both a strong farming industry, and a prosperous forestry (saw-milling) industry, Bird's desire to further his education took him beyond the trades of his hometown. After completing his schooling at Barrie Collegiate Institute, Bird left for Toronto, where he attended University of Toronto and then began his legal studies at Osgoode Hall Law School. He was called to the bar in 1893 and began to practice that same year with the Toronto-based law firm Edgar & Malone. After eight years in Toronto, Bird moved to Kenora, Ontario (then known as Rat Portage), where he helped open an Edgar & Malone branch office. He remained in Kenora for seven years.

On July 1, 1899, Bird married Caroline Irwin. Irwin and Bird had two sons, Henry J. (Harry), and Edward I. (Ted), and in 1903, the family relocated to Canada's west coast in Vancouver, British Columbia.

In Vancouver, Bird continued to practice law. He became a partner in the firm of Bird, Brydon Jack & McCrossan until 1907. From 1907 to 1912, Bird partnered with MacNeill and practiced in the firm of MacNeill & Bird until 1912, when two others joined the firm, making it MacNeill, Bird, Macdonald & Darling.

Aside from his practice, Bird held various business interests. He held a directorial role with the Coast Quarries, Ltd., the British Columbia Dental Supply Company, Ltd., and the Alberta Lumber Company, Ltd. Notably, Bird was a member of the labour-oriented Socialist Party of British Columbia, and was elected to Vancouver City Council as an alderman in 1908. He was a leftist candidate with Marxist ideologies; he and his socialists laid the foundation of the eventual Communist Party of Canada. Bird was a member of the Masonic Order alongside MacNeill, and was also a member of the Terminal City Club of Vancouver.

The Socialist Party of British Columbia was active in reaching out to the Sikhs and their Indian compatriots even before the Komagata Maru incident. Bird's interest in the Komagata Maru case was linked to the ideology that he [and his peers] held.

== Involvement in the Komagata Maru case ==
On April 4, 1914, the Japanese steamship, the Komagata Maru departed from Hong Kong. On May 23, 1914, the ship arrived at its destination in Vancouver, but was forced to be anchored in the Burrard Inlet because of the extremely rigid immigration laws of the day. Its passengers were not allowed to disembark. The ship carried 376 Indians: 12 Hindus, 24 Muslims and 340 Sikhs, all British subjects (including 2 women and 4 children) who had come to make a new life in Canada.

With the passengers in need of legal counsel, the Khalsa Diwan Society of Vancouver called upon Bird to take on the case. The anti-Asian mood that prevailed in British Columbia was a significant obstacle in the way of Bird's chance at winning, and the tone was not lost on the media. Newspapers picked up the story calling the incident "The second Oriental invasion of Canada", with the Vancouver Sun writing: "Hindu (Sikh) invaders are now in the city harbour on the Komagata Maru." Bird intended to prove that the Komagata Maru's passengers should be allowed to land in Canada as British subjects, but this was a significant challenge. The premier of British Columbia, Sir Richard McBride openly opposed allowing the passengers onto Canadian soil, as did the mayor of Vancouver, Truman Smith Baxter, and several other members of the provincial legislature. McBride even went as far to say: "To admit Orientals in large numbers would mean in the end the extinction of the white peoples and we have always in mind the necessity of keeping this a white man's country."

Bird fought for equality, and attempted to challenge Canada's highly restrictive immigration laws surrounding race-based exclusion. His initial attempt to prove that the passengers should be granted entry based on being British subjects failed. The Board claimed that it is the individual country's right to control immigration. Though he worked tirelessly, the Board of Inquiry was very slow-moving. In a letter from Bird to Malcolm R.J. Reid, Chairman of the Board of Inquiry, Bird criticizes the conduct of the Board, calling the ordeal "a scandal", going on to say "Everything is being done by your Board to prevent any test case coming to the court."

Following Bird's letter to Reid, the Board of Inquiry allowed for one test case to be presented. Bird launched a defence in the case of Munshi Singh, one of the passengers of the Komagata Maru. Bird failed, perhaps largely because of his own argument. He aimed to examine a misuse of the term "race" in order to expose the absurdity of Canadian immigration laws, and put agents of the state on the defensive. Although effective at addressing the claims made by white racists and exclusionists, Bird was unable to sway the Board with his argument. He suggested there "is no such thing as an Asiatic race!" and that the term "race" is in fact "incapable of any understanding." In the end, the Board sided with a cultural, rather than racial differences, and the Komagata Maru was forced to return to India.

The Komagata Maru case was later turned over the Bird's partner, MacNeill after Bird was threatened by a local citizen for his involvement in the case. Bird and his wife chose to travel out of town to avoid the potential danger.

== Current news ==
Indo-Canadian film director, Deepa Mehta is currently planning a film about the Komagata Maru incident, under the title Expulsion. Playing the role of J. Edward Bird is British actor, Terence Stamp. The film's release is anticipated to coincide with the 100th commemorative anniversary of the incident.

== Related information ==
Notably, Bird's wife, Caroline Mary Irwin was born to James and Elizabeth (née Boyd) Irwin. The Boyd family, specifically Mossom Boyd, left a lasting legacy on Bobcaygeon; he developed a very successful lumber empire, and became known as the lumber king of Trent.

Bird's sister Elizabeth married future Chief Justice of Canada Lyman Duff in 1898.
