= SS Komagata Maru =

Cargo steamship that in 1914 was involved in an immigration dispute in Canada

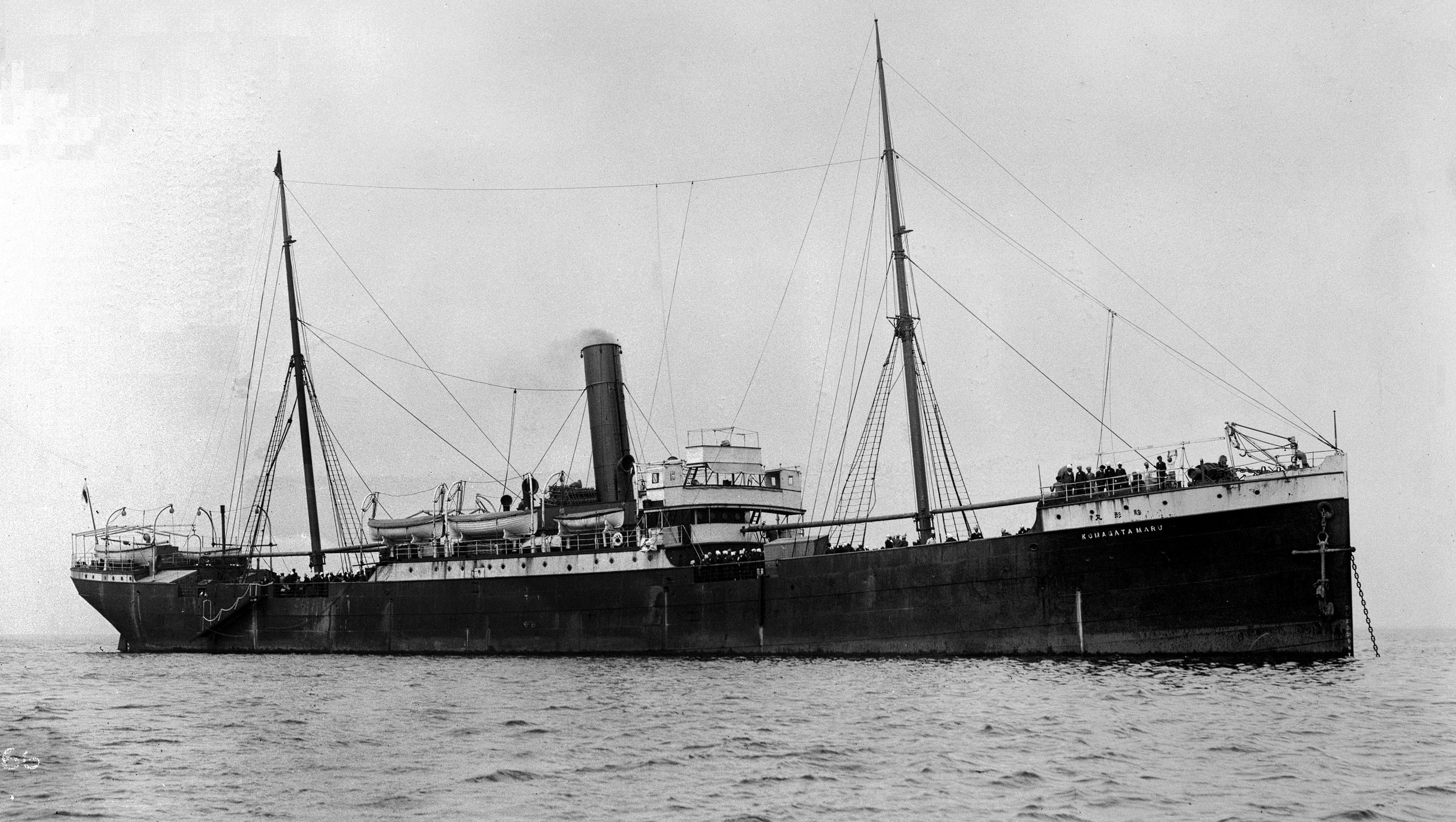
- Komagata Maru in 1914

History
- Name: 1890: Stubbenhuk; 1894: Sicilia; 1913: Komagata Maru; 1914: Guru Nanak Jahaz; 1924: Heian Maru
- Owner: 1890: Dampfschiffs Rhederei "Hansa"; 1894: Hamburg America Line; 1913: Shinyei Kisen Goshi Kaisha; 1917 Kawauchi Goshi Kaisha; 1921 Yamashita Kisen KK; 1923 Kabafuto Kisen KK; 1924 Kasahara Shoji KK
- Port of registry: 1890: (German Empire) Hamburg; 1913: (Japan) Dairen; 1921: (Japan) Fusan; 1923: (Japan) Nishinomiya; 1924: (Japan) Osaka
- Route: 1890: Hamburg – North America
- Builder: Charles Connell & Co, Scotstoun
- Yard number: 168
- Launched: 13 August 1890
- Completed: September 1890
- Maiden voyage: 19 October 1890
- Identification: 1893: code letters RJCS; 1917: code letters QBHP; Japanese official number 25107
- Fate: Wrecked in 1926

General characteristics
- Type: Cargo ship
- Tonnage: 2,943 GRT, 1,921 NRT
- Length: 329 ft (100 m)
- Beam: 41.5 ft (12.6 m)
- Depth: 25.8 ft (7.9 m)
- Decks: 2
- Installed power: 288 NHP
- Propulsion: Triple-expansion engine
- Speed: 11 knots (20 km/h)
- Notes: Sister ship: Grimm

Komagata Maru (Japanese: 駒形丸, Hepburn: Komagata Maru) was a cargo steamship that was built in Scotland in 1890, was in German ownership until 1913, and then had a succession of Japanese owners until she was wrecked in 1926. She was launched as Stubbenhuk, renamed Sicilia in 1894, Komagata Maru in 1913 and Heian Maru in 1924.

In 1914 Komagata Maru was chartered to take 376 Sikh and other migrants from the Far East to Canada, where they wished to settle. Before it set sail from Hong Kong to Vancouver in 1914, the Komagata Maru steamship was renamed Guru Nanak Jahaz. This resulted in the Komagata Maru incident, in which Canadian immigration authorities in Vancouver, British Columbia refused to let most of them disembark.

== Building and German ownership ==
In 1890, Charles Connell and Company of Scotstoun, Glasgow built a pair of cargo steamships for Dampfschiffs Rhederei "Hansa". (Note: Not to be confused with Deutsche Dampfschiffahrts-Gesellschaft Hansa, also known as "Hansa Line".) Yard number 167 was launched on 20 May as Grimm, and yard number 168 was launched on 13 August as Stubbenhuk. She was completed that September.

Stubbenhuk's registered length was 329 ft (100 m), her beam was 41.5 ft (12.6 m) and her depth was 25.8 ft (7.9 m). Her tonnages were 2,943 GRT and 1,921 NRT. She was mainly a cargo ship, but had berths for a small number of passengers.

She had a single screw, driven by a three-cylinder triple-expansion steam engine built by David Rowan & Co of Glasgow that was rated at 288 NHP and gave her a speed of 11 knots (20 km/h).

Dampfschiffs Rhederei "Hansa" registered Stubbenhuk at Hamburg. The company ran mainly cargo services between Hamburg, Canada and the United States. On 19 October 1890, Stubbenhuk left Hamburg on her maiden voyage, which was to Quebec and Montreal.

In 1892, Hamburg America Line (HAPAG) took over Dampfschiffs Rhederei "Hansa". By April 1892, Stubbenhuk's route included calls at Antwerp, and in December 1893 she called at Baltimore. By 1893 her German code letters were RJCS. In 1894 HAPAG absorbed the Hansa fleet into its own and renamed its ships. Grimm and Stubbenhuk became Scotia and Sicilia respectively.

== Japanese ownership ==
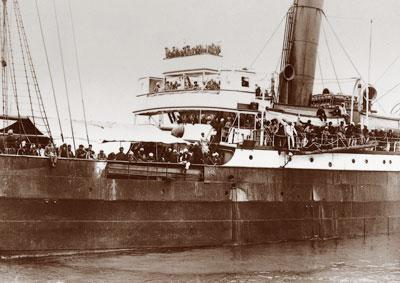
Komagata Maru off Vancouver with Indian migrants in 1914

In 1913, Shinyei Kisen Goshi Kaisha bought Sicilia, renamed her Komagata Maru, and registered her in Dairen in the Japanese-ruled Kwantung Leased Territory. Shinyei Kisen Goshi owned one other ship, and four or five people owned the company.

It was from Shinyei Kisen that Sikh migrants chartered her in 1914 to take them across the Pacific to British Columbia. Her holds were cleaned and fitted out with latrines, wooden benches, a meeting room and a Sikh Gurdwara. On 4 April 1914, she left Hong Kong carrying 150 migrants. She embarked further Indian migrants at Shanghai, Moji and Yokohama. On 23 May, she reached Vancouver carrying 376 migrants, only 24 of whom were allowed to disembark. She lay at anchor in Vancouver Harbour until 23 July, when she left taking her remaining migrants back to Japan and India.

By 1917, Komagata Maru's Japanese code letters were QBHP. Her Japanese official number was 25107. In 1917, Kawauchi Goshi Kaisha acquired her, and by 1919, she was equipped for wireless telegraphy. In 1921, Yamashita Kisen KK acquired her and registered her in Fusan in Japanese-ruled Korea. In 1923, Kabafuto Kisen KK acquired her and registered her in Nishinomiya. In 1924, Kasahara Shoji KK acquired her, renamed her Heian Maru and registered her in Osaka.

== Loss ==
On 11 February 1926, Heian Maru was steaming around the coast of Hokkaido from Otaru to Muroran when she was wrecked near Cape Sotomari.

== In popular culture ==
The incident of Komagata Maru incident was depicted in Punjabi movie Guru Nanak Jahaz

== Bibliography ==
- Haws, Duncan (1980). The Ships of the Hamburg America, Adler and Carr Lines. Merchant Fleets in Profile. Vol. 4. Cambridge: Patrick Stephens Ltd. ISBN 0-85059-397-2.
- Johnston, Hugh JM (1979). The Voyage of the Komagata Maru: The Sikh challenge to Canada's Colour Bar (1st ed.). Toronto: Oxford University Press. ISBN 978-0-19-561164-9. OCLC 6610593.
- Kazimi, Ali (2011). Undesirables: White Canada and the Komagata Maru. Vancouver: D&M Publishers. ISBN 978-1553659730.
- Lloyd's Register of Shipping. Vol. I–Steamers. London: Lloyd's Register of Shipping. 1891 – via Internet Archive.
- Lloyd's Register of Shipping. Vol. I–Steamers. London: Lloyd's Register of Shipping. 1893 – via Internet Archive.
- Lloyd's Register of Shipping. Vol. I–Steamers. London: Lloyd's Register of Shipping. 1917 – via Internet Archive.
- Lloyd's Register of Shipping. Vol. I–Steamers. London: Lloyd's Register of Shipping. 1919 – via Internet Archive.
