= Workers Party of Acapulco =

Workers Party of Acapulco Partido Obrero de Acapulco
- Abbreviation: POA
- President: Juan R. Escudero
- Founded: 1919
- Dissolved: December 1923; 102 years ago
- Succeeded by: Partido Obrero de Tecpan (not official successor)
- Headquarters: Acapulco, Mexico
- Newspaper: Regeneración
- Ideology: Socialism; Magonism
- Political position: Left-wing to far-left
- Slogan: Let men be mutilated for principles, but not principles for men.

Workers Party of Acapulco (Spanish: Partido Obrero de Acapulco) was a Mexican Magonist and Socialist political party locally in Acapulco, Mexico. Founded by Juan R. Escudero and existed between 1919 and 1923. POA published Regeneración.

The party represented worker-peasant movements of a regional scope that sought electoral means to lay the foundations for the construction of popular and democratic local power.

== Background ==
between the mid-19th century and early 20th century during the Porfirio Presidency. Acapulco was a focal point for gachupíns. Essentially, wealthy families and or Individuals predominantly from Spain.

As a result of the influx of these substantial families moving into Acapulco, commerce and economics were strictly controlled by the upper-class families. In turn, the lower working-class locals of Acapulco went through alleged forms of exploitation and difficult working conditions.

The Spanish maintained tight control over the city, and the military's complicity prevented peasant revolts. However, the labor conditions and authoritarian control that they imposed on the lower classes provided thriving ground for left-wing ideas and ideology.

== During the Mexican Revolution ==
=== Founding of the Workers’ Leagues ===
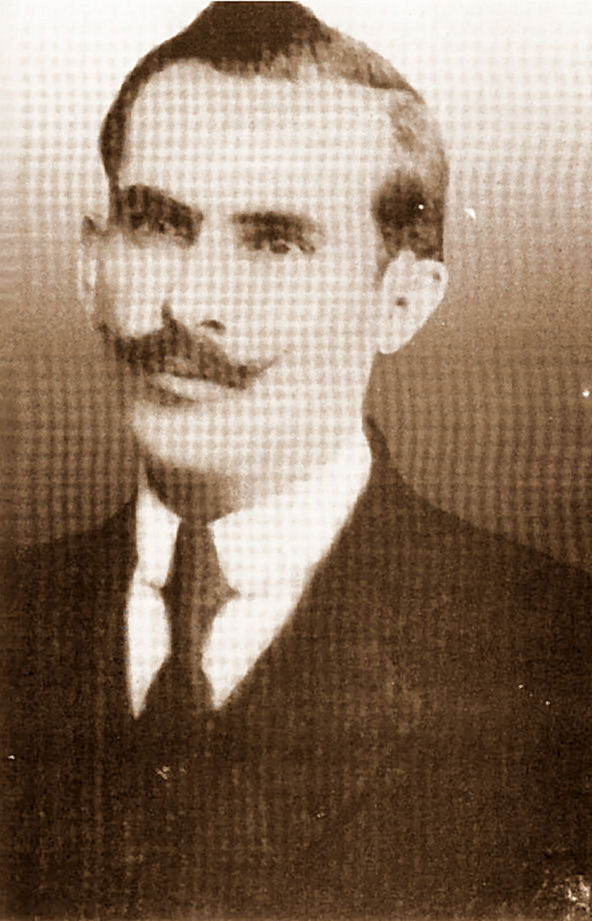
Portrait of Juan R.Escudero

in 1911 in response to the strict control imposed by the foreign upper class. Juan R. Escudero founded and led the League of Workers of the Port of Acapulco (Spanish: Liga de Trabajadores y Obreros del Puerto de Acapulco) , which brought together peasants and commoners from Acapulco and the state of Guerrero.

The “Association” was transformed between 1912 and 1913 into the League of Workers on Board Ships and Land (Spanish: Liga de Trabajadores a Bordo de Buques y Terrestres) . a workers union which declared itself in favor of the Revolution and demanded the payment of salaries in cash to avoid the payment of commercial houses conveniently made to their workers, with market prices set by themselves.

When Francisco I. Madero came to the presidency between 1911 and 1913 and not able to resolve the expectations of all the raised sectors, In Guerrero. The peasants and other commoners radicalizing themselves with the ideals of the Ayala Plan, separated themselves from the landowners, and began to build their own identity that was already outlined in their demands.

=== Huerta’s coup ===
The coup delivered by Victoriano Huerta in February 1913 further fractured the political scene in the entity. Porfiristas as well as some upstarts, supported Huertism in the coastal region, subsidized by the commercial houses of the port.

Venustiano Carranza's diplomants arrived at the port in mid-1914 and with the emergence of constitutionalism before Huerta's coup, represented an effort to pacify and unite the different revolutionary forces that were scattered throughout the country; and for this purpose, it helped establish contact with the Acapulco labor movements offering guarantees to improve working conditions, a promise that was accepted by Escudero, who was officially named as a representative of constitutionalism in the port; Later, The House of the World Worker of Acapulco (Spanish: La Casa del Obrero Mundial de Acapulco) was created and Escudero was elected as general secretary.

in response to the labor union that had obtained its formalization, the oligarchs regrouped and created the Acapulco Chamber of Commerce a few months before.

=== 1915 Acapulco Dock Strikes ===
Between the months of July and September 1915, The dockers who were subjected to aberrant working conditions went on strike and appointed a committee for negotiation that had the support and advice from the House of the World Worker of Acapulco.

The Spanish oligarchs controlling the commerce refused to recognize the demands of the dockworkers only managed to prolong and enlarge the strike, paralyzing and disrupting port activity and affecting the life of the commercial houses.

The Acapulco Chamber of Commerce attempting to end the strikes, forced other workers to replace the dockworkers in unloading tasks. eventually, the strikers were forced at gunpoint to resume their activities with the same working conditions for which they had stopped. the written press, controlled by the oligarchy and meetings with state and federal authorities in which they all imaged and accused Escudero for staging "anarchy" with prevailing the port and strikers.

=== Exile of Escudero ===
Escudero was arrested and imprisoned after having formed and undertake social plans that affected the interests of Spanish business oligarchs. he was later expelled from the state of Guerrero by the then Governor Silvestre G. Mariscal.

The exile lasted until 1918, during those almost three years of itinerancy, where Escudero would establish contact with Ricardo Flores Magón and managed to link up with the House of the World Worker, working as a garden inspector, court secretary and taking the time to study in detail the recently promulgated Constitution that was established in 1917.

In those years of exile, the local oligarchy used indiscriminately Maderism, Huertism, Carrancism and Obregonism to prevent the port of any popular rebellions, The funds used by the oligarchy was for bribery, to pay the gunmen to maintain dumping practices, keep officials at all levels on the payroll and finance attacks by different means on opponents through military leaders and plaza bosses.

The Acapulco oligarchy at the time of the revolution, had no problem in negotiating with any political or military leader of any faction according to the circumstances, always in favor of its own interests. for this reason, the owners of the commercial houses and Oligarchs in the port did not hesitate to join forces with Carrancism to confront the peasant movements rising up in Guerrero led at that time by Jesús H. Salgado, who was ideologically close to Emiliano Zapata.

The Spanish oligarchy used Carrancism to manage itself to stay afloat but also used it in the union that Escudero created to combat Zapatism, Furthermore it embraced the policy of reconciliation that constitutionalism offered in the union and the introduction of Silvestre G. Mariscal into the peasant movements in Acapulco.

== See also ==
- National Assembly of the Socialist Left
