= List of shipwrecks in March 1914 =

The list of shipwrecks in March 1914 includes ships sunk, foundered, grounded, or otherwise lost during March 1914.

== 1 March ==
List of shipwrecks: 1 March 1914
Ship	State	Description
Jacob S. Winslow	United States	The lumber schooner was wrecked on the south end of Block Island, Rhode Island, in a gale. The crew made it to shore in her boat. One crewman was later sent back to warn off wreckers, but was killed later when the sea got even rougher and the ship broke up, a total loss.

== 2 March ==
List of shipwrecks: 2 March 1914
Ship	State	Description
N. S. Gallop	United States	The motor schooner went ashore in Thimble Islands, Connecticut.

== 3 March ==
List of shipwrecks: 3 March 1914
Ship	State	Description
Tasman	Norway	The barque capsized and sank in the North Sea.

== 4 March ==
List of shipwrecks: 4 March 1914
Ship	State	Description
Fulmar	United Kingdom	The cargo ship ran aground at Barrow-in-Furness, Lancashire. She was refloated on 9 March.

== 5 March ==
List of shipwrecks: 5 March 1914
Ship	State	Description
H. E. Hamlin	United States	The fishing steamer sank at Tiverton, Rhode Island.

== 6 March ==
List of shipwrecks: 6 March 1914
Ship	State	Description
Autocrat	United States	The luxury yacht sank in the Danvers River at Beverly, Massachusetts. Later raised.
Charlemagne Tower Junior	United States	The cargo ship foundered in the Atlantic Ocean 1 nautical mile (1.9 km) off Seaside Park, New Jersey (some sources say on 8 March), a total loss. Four crew were rescued by the United States Life Saving Service when her small lifeboat capsized in rough surf, the other 18 were rescued at sea in her large lifeboat by Bay Port (flag unknown).

== 7 March ==
List of shipwrecks: 7 March 1914
Ship	State	Description
Julia A. Truher	United States	The schooner was abandoned in the Atlantic Ocean (38°15′N 66°09′W). Her crew were rescued by Nubian (United Kingdom).

== 9 March ==
List of shipwrecks: 9 March 1914
Ship	State	Description
Bydgo	Norway	The coaster collided with Dania (Denmark) at Skagen, Denmark and sank.
Hokuse Maru	Japan	The cargo ship collided with Oriental (United Kingdom) at Shanghai, China and sank.

== 11 March ==
List of shipwrecks: 11 March 1914
Ship	State	Description
Wellesley	United Kingdom	The wreck of Wellesley in 1914. The training ship – formerly the ship-of-the-line HMS Boscawen (Royal Navy) – burned and sank at her moorings on the River Tyne at North Shields, England. A total loss, she was scrapped later in 1914.

== 12 March ==
List of shipwrecks: 12 March 1914
Ship	State	Description
Gordon's Charge	United Kingdom	The schooner ran aground on Sully Island, Glamorgan. She was refloated and beached for repairs. She was refloated on 28 March and towed to Newport, Monmouthshire.
Turia	Spain	The cargo ship was driven ashore at Dénia, Alicante and wrecked.

== 13 March ==
List of shipwrecks: 13 March 1914
Ship	State	Description
James Shearer	United Kingdom	The schooner foundered in St. Bride's Bay. Her crew survived.

== 14 March ==
List of shipwrecks: 14 March 1914
Ship	State	Description
Catharine	United Kingdom	The brigantine ran aground at Newhaven, Sussex and was wrecked. Her crew were rescued by the Newhaven Lifeboat.
Dorothea	Netherlands	The cargo ship was driven ashore on Chesil Beach, Dorset, United Kingdom. She was refloated on 20 October.
Hydra	Norway	The brig sprang a leak and was abandoned in the North Sea. Her crew were rescued by Dronningen (Norway).
Irish Girl	United Kingdom	The schooner ran aground on Little Roancorrig, County Cork and was wrecked. Her crew survived.
Jaghin	United Kingdom	The barge was driven ashore at Newhaven and wrecked. Her crew were rescued by the Newhaven Lifeboat.
Leonardo	Italy	The coaster sank at Melilla, Spanish Morocco in a storm.

== 15 March ==
List of shipwrecks: 15 March 1914
Ship	State	Description
Trifolium	Sweden	The barque was driven ashore at Whitesand Bay, Sennen, Cornwall, United Kingdom with the loss of five of her eleven crew.

== 16 March ==
List of shipwrecks: 16 March 1914
Ship	State	Description
Coburn	United Kingdom	The tug foundered in the River Thames at Greenhithe, Kent with the loss of all five crew.
Terranova	United States	The fishing schooner ran aground in fog 1 mile (1.6 km) south of the Pamet River Life-Saving Station, Massachusetts a total loss. Her 23 crew was rescued by the United States Life Saving Service.

== 17 March ==
List of shipwrecks: 17 March 1914
Ship	State	Description
City of Sydney	United Kingdom	The cargo ship was driven ashore at Cape Sambro, Nova Scotia, Canada and was wrecked.
Walter A. Luckenbach	United States	The tug went ashore on Black Point near Niantic, Connecticut. Pulled off and returned to service.

== 18 March ==
List of shipwrecks: 18 March 1914
Ship	State	Description
Balder	United Kingdom	The three-masted schooner foundered in the English Channel 6 nautical miles (11 km) south west of The Needles, Isle of Wight. All six crew were rescued by the tug Vulcan (Germany).
Terra Nova	Canada	The fishing schooner went ashore and broke up on Cape Cod, Massachusetts near the Pamet River Life-Saving Station.

== 19 March ==
List of shipwrecks: 19 March 1914
Ship	State	Description
Africa	Belgium	The cargo ship was wrecked at Zaccarossa, Sardinia, Italy. She was refloated and scrapped in 1915.
Torquay	Norway	The cargo ship collided with a trawler and sank in the North Sea. Her crew were rescued.

== 20 March ==
List of shipwrecks: 20 March 1914
Ship	State	Description
Ellen and Mary	United States	The fishing schooner went ashore on Georges Island in the harbor at Boston, Massachusetts.

== 22 March ==
List of shipwrecks: 22 March 1914
Ship	State	Description
Hattie P. Simpson	United States	The schooner sank off Cape Lookout, North Carolina. Her captain and three or five crew died. Four survivors were rescued from one of her boats six days later by Caracas (flag unknown).
Oddersjaa	Norway	The cargo ship was reported to have been seen abandoned in the Atlantic Ocean (46°33′N 7°58′W) on this date.

== 27 March ==
List of shipwrecks: 27 March 1914
Ship	State	Description
Antioch	United States	During a voyage with a cargo of railroad timbers from Savannah, Georgia, to New York City, the 180-foot (54.9 m), 986-gross register ton three-masted schooner was wrecked at Manasquan, New Jersey, during a storm. All ten crew members survived. Her wreck sank in 15 to 20 feet (4.6 to 6.1 m) of water.
Lizzie H. Brayton	United States	The 201-foot (61.3 m), 979-gross register ton four-masted schooner was wrecked at Manasquan, New Jersey, during a storm. All nine crew members survived. Her wreck sank in 15 feet (4.6 m) of water.

== 29 March ==
List of shipwrecks: 29 March 1914
Ship	State	Description
Isobe Maru	Japan	The cargo ship ran aground at Fukaura, Aomori. Salvage operations were abandoned in mid May.
Wm. Thos. Moore	United States	The schooner ran aground on the bar on the west side of Little River Inlet. She was pulled off on 9 April by USRC Seminole ( United States Revenue Marine).

== 31 March ==
List of shipwrecks: 31 March 1914
Ship	State	Description
Southern Cross	Canada	The barque-rigged sealer sank off the east coast of Canada with the loss of 173 lives.

== Unknown date ==
List of shipwrecks: Unknown date 1914
Ship	State	Description
Cecil	Norway	The cargo ship ran aground on Mayaguana, Bahamas and was wrecked between 1 and 11 March.
