= April 1914 =

Month of 1914

<<	April 1914					>>
Su	Mo	Tu	We	Th	Fr	Sa
			1	2	3	4
5	6	7	8	9	10	11
12	13	14	15	16	17	18
19	20	21	22	23	24	25
26	27	28	29	30

The following events occurred in April 1914:

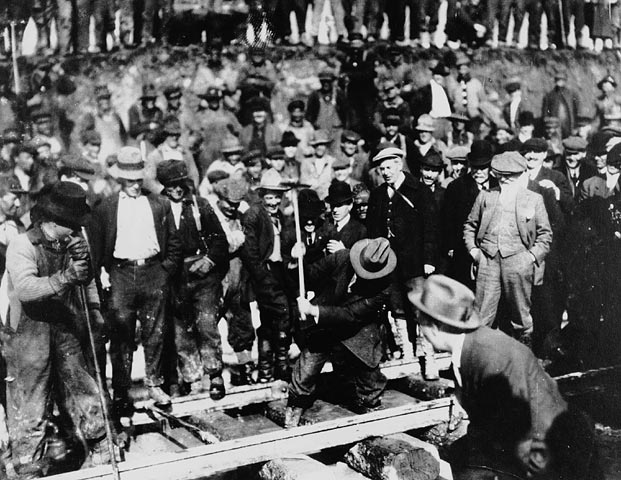
Laying the last spike of the Grand Trunk Pacific Railway in Fort Fraser, British Columbia

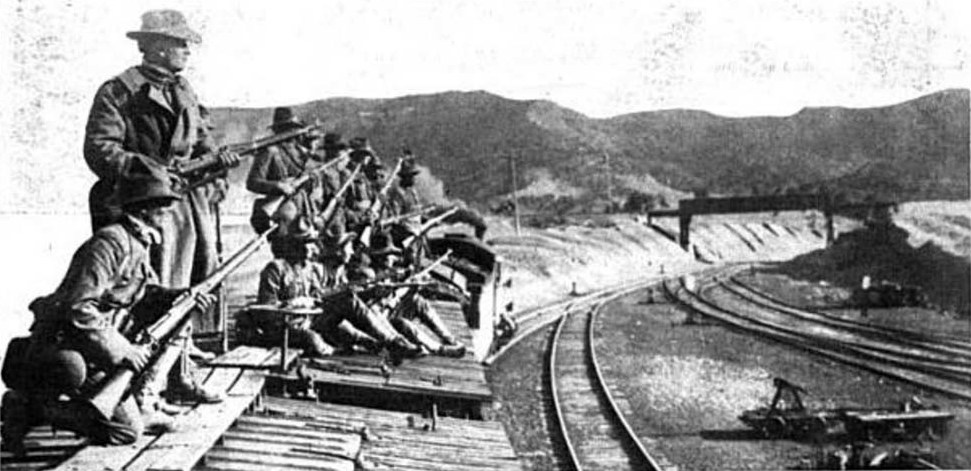
Colorado National Guard soldiers entering strike zone at Ludlow, Colorado

== April 1, 1914 (Wednesday) ==
- Burston Strike School — British schoolteachers Annie and Tom Higdon were dismissed from the Church of England village school in Burston, Norfolk, England following disputes with the local school managing body over the conditions of the school building. Upon the firing, 66 of 72 students at the school went on strike in support of the Higdons. In defiance of the education governing body, the teachers and students formed a strike school that eventually resulted in a new building by 1917.
- Line A of the Buenos Aires Underground was extended with the addition of stations Loria, Castro Barros, Río de Janeiro, Acoyte, and Caballito.
- The Inukai railroad opened in Ōita Prefecture, Japan, with stations Nakahanda, Takio, Ōita, Kōzaki, Miyanohira, Sakanoichi, Takajō, and Tsurusaki serving the line.
- The Carpenders Park railway station opened in London.
- The association football club Strasbourg Alsace received a lease for a home field in Strasbourg, Germany that eventually became the site to build the Stade de la Meinau.
- The association football club Ljungby was formed in Ljungby, Sweden.
- Died: Rube Waddell, American baseball player, pitcher for the Philadelphia Athletics and St. Louis Browns, inducted into the National Baseball Hall of Fame and Museum (b. 1876)

== April 2, 1914 (Thursday) ==
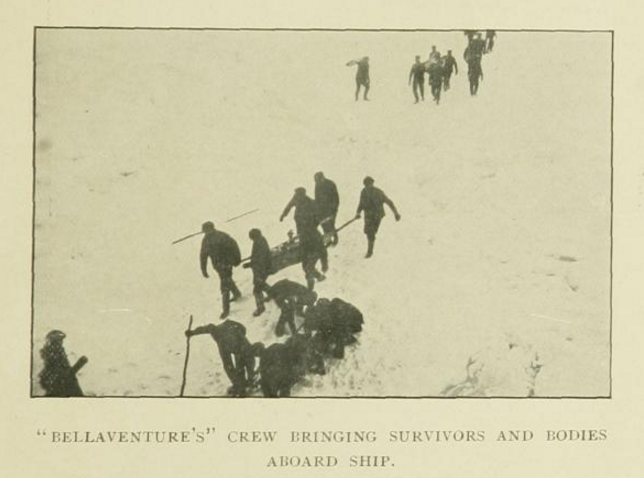
Carrying survivors and bodies from SS Newfoundland sealing disaster

- Pancho Villa telegraphed Venustiano Carranza to report his forces had retaken Torreón, Mexico after 11 days of fighting. Villa reported his forces sustained casualties of 2,000 killed or wounded, and estimated over 12,000 federal troops dead, wounded or captured. The capture of the city gave the Mexican rebel army near complete control of north central Mexico.
- Wes Kean, captain of the SS Newfoundland, spotted survivors of 132 sealers from his ship that had been trapped on ice floes off Newfoundland for three days during a blizzard. Using an improvised distress signal, Kean alerted nearby ship SS Bellaventure to assist, with crewman venturing onto the ice with blankets, food, and drink. In total, 77 men died on the ice, with only 69 bodies recovered; another survivor died later in the hospital from complications from exposure.
- The U.S. Navy gunboat Dolphin, entered Tampico harbor in Mexico and presented a 21-gun salute to the Mexican flag three times as tribute to the celebrated occupation of Puebla in 1867 during the Second French intervention in Mexico. It was the last peaceful diplomatic exchange between the United States Government and the Mexican government under Victoriano Huerta before relations dissolved during the Tampico Affair days later.
- Some 300 Pentecostal preachers and laymen from 20 U.S. states and several countries gathered for a general council in Hot Springs, Arkansas to discuss ways to protect and preserve the results of Pentecostal revivalism through cooperative fellowship.
- Twenty people were killed and another 50 injured when a train derailed near Tanjung Priok, Indonesia. A herd of buffalo crossed the track near a bridge crossing six miles (9 kilometers) outside the city, forcing the train off the rails.
- The Australian steamer SS Kate, a renowned tug in Sydney harbor, was wrecked after 30 years of service to Australia's shipping industry. The ferry Bellubera collided with the tug and cut it in half, with all boat crew rescued.
- The Irishwomen's Council, the Irish republican women's paramilitary organisation, was formed in Dublin as an auxiliary of the Irish Volunteers involving members from the Daughters of Ireland nationalist organization.
- Construction began on the Connaught Tunnel in the Selkirk Mountains under Rogers Pass on the Canadian Pacific Railway main line between Calgary and Revelstoke, British Columbia.
- The Sant'Elena Church in Rome opened for worship.
- Born:
  - Alec Guinness, British actor, best known for his collaborations with David Lean including the films Lawrence of Arabia and Doctor Zhivago, and as Obi-Wan Kenobi in the original Star Wars trilogy, recipient for Academy Award for Best Actor in The Bridge on the River Kwai; as Alec Guinness de Cuffe, in London, England (d. 2000)
  - Hans Wegner, Danish furniture designer, one of the developers of Organic Functionality in furniture; in Tønder, German Empire (present-day Denmark) (d. 2007)
  - Edwin Alonzo Boyd, Canadian bank robber, leader of the Boyd Gang; in Toronto, Canada (d. 2002)
- Died: Paul Heyse, German writer, recipient of the 1910 Nobel Prize in Literature (b. 1830)

== April 3, 1914 (Friday) ==
- The Federal University of Alfenas was established in Alfenas, Brazil as a school for dentistry and pharmacy. The school expanded into other science and medical programs and became a federal university in 2005.
- Born: Kay Stammers, British tennis player, winner of the women's doubles at the French Open in 1935 and Wimbledon women's doubles in 1935 and 1936; as Katherine Stammers, in St Albans, England (d. 2005)

== April 4, 1914 (Saturday) ==
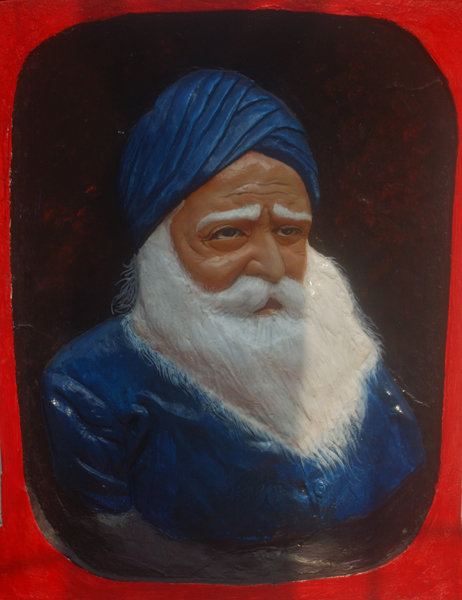
Baba Gurdit Singh, organizer of the Komagata Maru voyage

- Hundreds of anxious spectators gathered in St. John's, Newfoundland harbor to meet the SS Bellaventure as it arrived with the frozen bodies of 69 sealers who died while caught in a blizzard on ice floes two days earlier. Another 63 survivors disembarked with injuries from frostbite or exposure to cold.
- Komagata Maru incident – Merchant fisherman Baba Gurdit Singh chartered the Japanese vessel Komagata Maru to pick up 165 passengers (all subjects of British India) in Hong Kong on the first leg of the voyage to Vancouver.
- Canadian Arctic Expedition — Captain Robert Bartlett of the shipwreck Karluk and his Inuk guide Kataktovik reached the Siberian coast after weeks on the Arctic ice searching for other members of the polar expedition that had left Wrangel Island where the main party were camped. The two followed a sledge track to a Chukchi village where they were given food and shelter for a night.
- Scotland beat England 3–1 in the final association football game of the British Home Championship in Glasgow, but under the aggregate point system Ireland was the champion, the first time in the championship's history. The start of World War I would put the annual championship on hold for six years.
- Edgar Rice Burroughs published his fantasy serial novel At the Earth's Core in four parts through All-Story Weekly. The hardcover would be published in 1922.
- Born:
  - Sam Manekshaw, Indian military officer, field marshal for the Indian Army; in Amritsar, British India (present-day India) (d. 2008)
  - Marguerite Duras, French writer and film director, author of The Sea Wall and Hiroshima mon amour; as Marguerite Donnadieu, in Gia Định, French Indochina (present-day Ho Chi Minh City, Vietnam) (d. 1996)
  - Richard Coogan, American actor, best known for the title role in the film serial Captain Video and His Video Rangers from 1949 to 1950; in Short Hills, New Jersey, United States (d. 2014)
  - David Goodall, British-Australian biologist, editor of the Ecosystems of the World book series; in Edmonton, London, England (d. 2018)
- Died: Friedrich Weyerhäuser, German-American business leader, founder of Weyerhaeuser, the world's largest private owner of timberlands (b. 1834)

== April 5, 1914 (Sunday) ==
- A commission set up by Venustiano Carranza formally implicated Pancho Villa's favorite officer Major Rudolfo Fierro for the death of British rancher William S. Benton while under custody by the Mexican revolutionary leader.
- A bomb exploded in the church of St Martin-in-the-Fields in London, causing major property damage. British suffragists were suspected to be behind the bombing but no firm evidence was obtained.
- Italian cyclist Ugo Agostoni won the 8th Milan–San Remo cycling race in Sanremo, Italy.
- The Hokusei railroad opened in Mie Prefecture, Japan, with stations Anoh, Ariyoshi, Hoshikawa, Nanawa, Nishibessho, Ōyamada, Rengeji, Sohara, and Umamichi serving the line.

== April 6, 1914 (Monday) ==
- The Roman Catholic Diocese of Shantou was established in Guangzhou, China.
- A federation of four provincial councils in Catalonia, Spain, together formed the Commonwealth of Catalonia as a means to bolster the eastern Spanish region's political influence in Spanish Parliament and strengthen economic growth in the region.
- British General Charles W. H. Douglas replaced Field-Marshal Sir John French as Chief of the Imperial General Staff, serving in the command position during the first three months of World War I.
- An explosion in the forward fireroom of U.S. Navy destroyer USS Aylwin (DD-47) killed three sailors.
- Radio inventor Hiram Percy Maxim of Hartford, Connecticut, founded the American Radio Relay League, the largest membership association of amateur radio enthusiasts in the United States.
- The second film adaptation of Charles Dickens' The Old Curiosity Shop was released, starring Alma Taylor.
- Died:
  - Józef Chełmoński, Polish painter, member of the realist movement (b. 1849)
  - Lillian M. N. Stevens, American activist, president of the Woman's Christian Temperance Union from 1898 to 1914 (b. 1843)

== April 7, 1914 (Tuesday) ==
- General elections in Sweden ended with the General Electoral League emerging as the largest party, winning 86 of the 230 seats in the Second Chamber. It allowed Hjalmar Hammarskjöld to retain his position as Prime Minister that he had held as interim in February.
- The last spike was driven on the Grand Trunk Pacific Railway at Fort Fraser, British Columbia, 93 miles (150 km) west of Prince George, completing the line between Winnipeg and Prince Rupert.
- Canadian Arctic Expedition — Karluk Captain Robert Bartlett and his Inuk guide Kataktovik set off for East Cape, located on the Bering Sea coast, where the polar explorer hoped to find passage back to Alaska to arrange a rescue mission for the remaining main party camped on Wrangel Island. The journey was hampered by hurricane-force winds and extreme cold, but a network of Chukchi villages along the Siberian coastline allowed Bartlett to trade for provisions.
- Al McCoy defeated George Chip with a surprise first-round knockout in Brooklyn, New York City, to take the World Middleweight Championship, holding onto the title until 1917.
- Born: Arthur Hezlet, South African-British naval officer, youngest officer to achieve rank of captain and rank of admiral in the Royal Navy, recipient of the Order of the British Empire, Order of the Bath, Distinguished Service Order, Distinguished Service Cross, and Legion of Merit; in Pretoria, South Africa (d. 2007)
- Died: Ayub Khan, Emir of Afghanistan from 1879 to 1880, leader of the Afghans in the Second Anglo-Afghan War (b. 1857); Charlie Ganzel, American baseball player, catcher for the Detroit Wolverines and Boston Beaneaters (b. 1862)

== April 8, 1914 (Wednesday) ==
- Over 158,000 women registered to vote for the first time in Illinois township elections voted in favor of adding 16 counties to the 30 that already prohibited the sale of alcohol, one of the first times the female vote had a major public impact on the American electorate. "Full suffrage is undoubtedly the next step," said the president of the Chicago Equal Suffrage Association.
- Komagata Maru incident – The Japanese vessel carrying British Indian citizens picked up more passengers in Shanghai, eventually totaling 376.
- British cargo ship Pengreep was launched at West Hartlepool, England.
- The Wight Pusher Seaplane was first flown following its debut at the Olympia Air Show in London.
- Born:
  - María Félix, Mexican actress, leading actress during the Golden Age of Mexican cinema; as María de los Ángeles Félix, in Álamos, Mexico (d. 2002)
  - Joan Henry, British author, known for the novel Who Lie in Gaol, adapted to film as The Weak and the Wicked; in London, England (d. 2000)
  - Robert Giroux, American publisher, co-founder of Farrar, Straus and Giroux; in Jersey City, New Jersey, United States (d. 2008)

== April 9, 1914 (Thursday) ==
- Tampico Affair – Mexican authorities arrested eight U.S. sailors from the naval gunship Dolphin in Tampico harbor, Mexico, under the mistaken assumption the sailors were members of the Constitutionalists that clashed with federal troops days before. Rear Admiral Henry T. Mayo, the commander of U.S. naval forces in the area, demanded a 21-gun salute and formal apology from the Mexican government. In response, Mexican President Victoriano Huerta ordered the release of the sailors and gave a written apology. However, he refused to have his forces raise the U.S. flag on Mexican soil to provide a 21-gun salute, inciting calls for action in Washington.
- The very first naval/aircraft skirmish took place in Topolobampo, Mexico. Captain Gustavo Salinas Camiña of the Constitutionalists flew a Glenn L. Martin biplane loaded with explosives to attack Mexican naval gunboats Guerrero and Morelos that were set up to block the mouth of the harbor where the mutinous gunboat Tampico lay partially sunk. The gunboats fired on the biplane using small arms while Camiña dropped five bombs over the warships anchored close to each other. Neither bomb hit their targets but Camiña was able to fly back to the airfield safely.
- Robert E. Woodrow, a distant relative to U.S. President Woodrow Wilson, died in a motorcycle accident in Indianapolis. Woodrow's father was a cousin to President Wilson's mother.
- The first colour feature film, The World, the Flesh and the Devil, was shown in Great Britain.
- Store manager George James (G. J.) Coles opened the 'Coles Variety Store' in Melbourne, Australia, eventually growing to become a supermarket chain by the mid-20th century as Coles Supermarkets, Australia's second largest supermarket chain.
- Died:
  - Empress Shōken, Japanese empress consort for Emperor Meiji (b. 1849)
  - Eben Sumner Draper, American politician, 44th Governor of Massachusetts (b. 1858)

== April 10, 1914 (Good Friday) ==
- With the opposition in disarray, Pancho Villa was able to drive federal troops out of San Pedro, Coahuila, Mexico and occupy the city.
- The Andhra Pradesh Library Association (formerly Andhra Desa Library Association) was established in Vijayawada and is the oldest state library association in India.
- Born: Jack Badcock, Australian cricketer, played in seven Tests from 1936 to 1938; as Clayvel Lindsay Badcock, in Exton, Tasmania, Australia (d. 1982)

== April 11, 1914 (Saturday) ==
- Paris celebrated the 25th anniversary of the Eiffel Tower. The 324-metre (1,063 ft) tall iron structure had become an accepted landmark in the city.
- Canadian military nurse Margaret C. MacDonald was appointed Matron-in-Chief of the Canadian Nursing service band and became the first woman in the British Empire to reach the rank of major.
- The cornerstone was laid for the new city hall in Ocean City, New Jersey and would be completed by the end of the year. The building was added to the National Register of Historic Places in 1997.
- Alpha Rho Chi, a professional architecture fraternity, was founded at Hotel Sherman in Chicago.
- The first English-language performance of George Bernard Shaw's comedy Pygmalion opened at His Majesty's Theatre in London.
- Born:
  - Robert Stanfield, Canadian politician, 17th Premier of Nova Scotia and leader of the federal Progressive Conservative Party of Canada; in Truro, Nova Scotia, Canada (d. 2003)
  - Norman McLaren, Scottish-Canadian animator, renowned animator for the National Film Board of Canada, recipient of the Academy Award for Best Animated Short Film for Neighbours; as William Norman McLaren, in Stirling, Scotland (d. 1987)
  - Leroy Edwards, American basketball player, centre for the Kentucky Wildcats men's basketball team from 1934 to 1935, and Oshkosh All-Stars from 1937 to 1949; in Crawfordsville, Indiana, United States (d. 1971)
- Died: Carl Chun, German biologist, leader of the Valdivia Expedition (b. 1852)

== April 12, 1914 (Sunday) ==
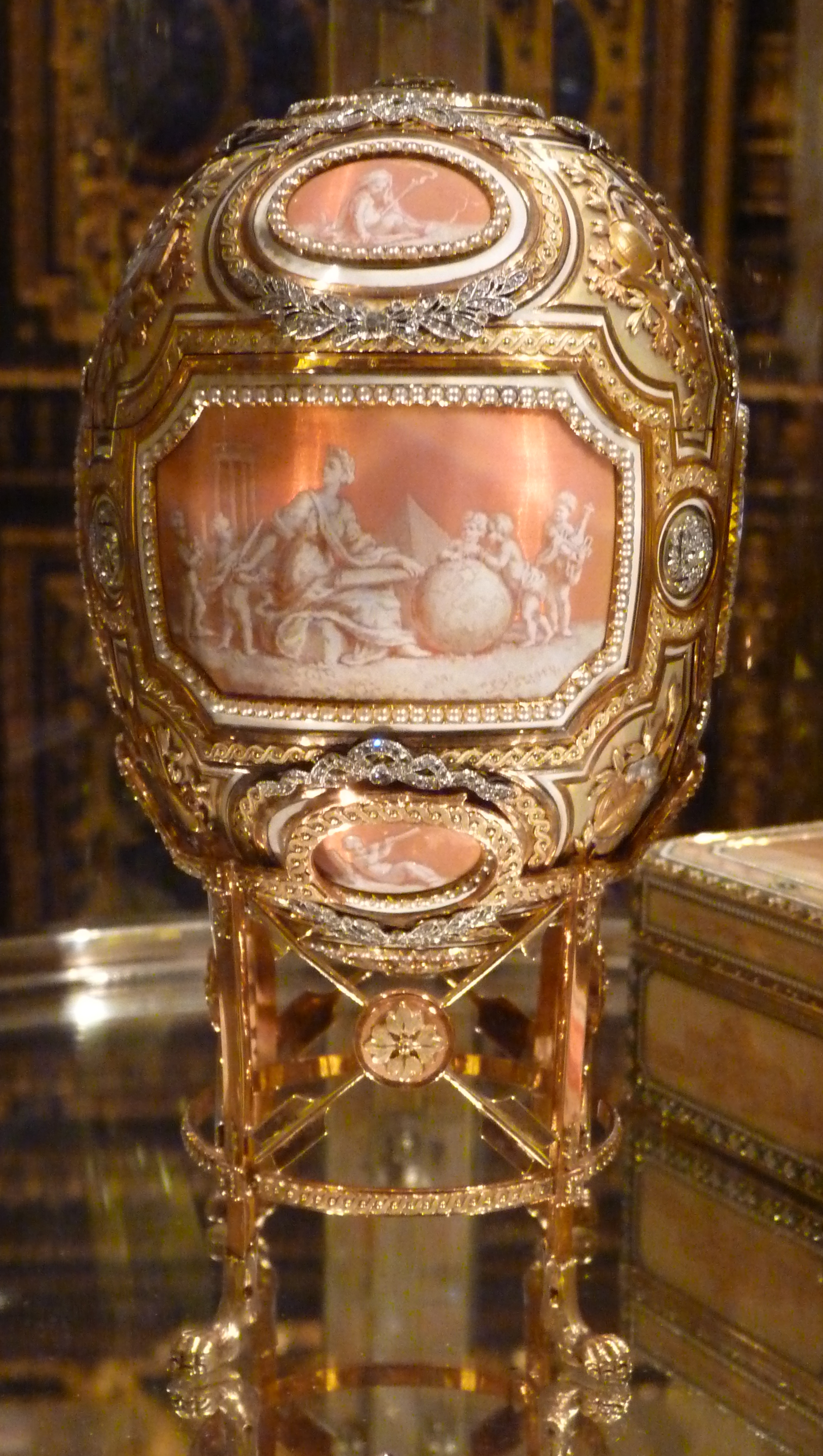
Catherine the Great Fabergé egg

- Tsar Nicholas presented as an Easter gift to his wife Empress Alexandra Feodorovna a jeweled enameled Easter egg crafted by Albert Holmström under the supervision of Peter Carl Fabergé. The gift would eventually be known as the world-famous Mosaic Fabergé egg. Nicholas also gave an Easter egg designed by Fabergé to his mother Maria Feodorovna that became known at the Catherine the Great.
- The first general council for the Assemblies of God was created through partnerships with several American Pentecostal organizations in Hot Springs, Arkansas following a general meeting of around 300 preachers and layman. The Assembly became the largest Pentecostal denomination of in the world.
- French road cyclist Charles Crupelandt won the 19th edition of the Paris–Roubaix tour, a 274 km (170 mi) bicycle road race from Paris to Roubaix, with an official time of nine hours and two minutes.
- The association football club América was formed in Recife, Brazil, one of the more successful clubs of Pernambuco state in Brazil, with six state championship titles to its name.
- Film legend Rudolph Valentino allegedly made his screen debut (uncredited) as a taxi dancer in The Battle of the Sexes, directed by D. W. Griffith.
- Franklin D. Roosevelt, then Assistant Secretary of the Navy, officially dedicated the opening of the new Cabrillo Bridge in San Diego.
- The Keihin Railway extended the Keikyū Main Line in the Kanagawa Prefecture, Japan, with station Kagetsu-sōjiji serving the line.
- The Opera House opened in Wellington.
- The Mark Strand Theatre opened in the Manhattan Theatre District. It was first "movie palace" theatre that offered customers a full theatrical experience, and a step-up from the modest store-front nickelodeons where movies where shown before.
- Born: Gilbert Taylor, British cinematographer, known for his film works including Dr. Strangelove, A Hard Day's Night, Repulsion, The Omen, and Star Wars; in Bushey, England (d. 2013)

== April 13, 1914 (Monday) ==
- Members of the Western Federation of Miners voted to end the strike in Copper Country, Michigan without achieving any of its major goals.
- Former New York Governor William Sulzer, along with other Democrats, formed the American Party in Albany, New York to protest what was perceived as undue political influence by Tammany Hall leader Charles Francis Murphy on the state government.
- The final match of the international rugby Five Nations Championship was played in Paris between France and England, with England crushing France 39–13. England took the top spot of the championship table with eight points, followed by Wales with six points, and Ireland with four points.
- Born: Børge Mogensen, Danish furniture designer, member of the Danish modern movement; in Aalborg, Denmark (d. 1972)

== April 14, 1914 (Tuesday) ==
- The Uryankhay Republic in Central Asia was annexed by the Russian Empire.
- The "First International Criminal Police Congress" was held in Monaco, with representatives of 24 countries represented, as one of several attempts to formalize international police cooperation (a different, later effort in 1923 resulted in the creation of Interpol).
- Komagata Maru incident – The Japanese vessel arrived in Yokohama with a total contingent of 376 passengers, including 340 Sikhs, 24 Muslims, and 12 Hindus, all British subjects.
- A collision at Burntisland railway station in Scotland between an express and a shunting goods train following a signalman's error killed two locomotive crew and injured twelve passengers.
- The city of Irving, Texas was incorporated.
- Born:
  - Orhan Veli Kanık, Turkish poet, one of the founders of the Garip movement; in Istanbul, Ottoman Empire (present-day Turkey) (d. 1950)
  - Hans Hahn, German air force officer, commander of Jagdgeschwader 2 and Jagdgeschwader 54 for the Luftwaffe during World War II, recipient of the Knight's Cross of the Iron Cross; in Gotha, German Empire (present-day Germany) (d. 1982)

== April 15, 1914 (Wednesday) ==
- Some 8,000 federal soldiers from San Pedro, Coahuila, Mexico were trapped by two factions of rebel soldiers after the railroad they were retreating on was sabotaged.
- Russian battleship Imperator Aleksandr III was launched by the Russad Shipyard in Nikolayev, Russian Empire, the third and last dreadnought ship for the Imperial Russian Navy.
- A bust of British journalist W. T. Stead was unveiled in The Hague to commemorate the renowned pacifist's passing on the RMS Titanic when it sank on April 15, 1912.
- Sinclair Lewis married Vogue editor Grace Livingston Hegger in a civil ceremony in Brooklyn, New York City.
- Actor Sydney Deane became the first Australian to appear in a Hollywood film when he debuted in Brewster's Millions, a comedy film directed by Oscar Apfel and Cecil B. DeMille and starring Edward Abeles.

== April 16, 1914 (Thursday) ==
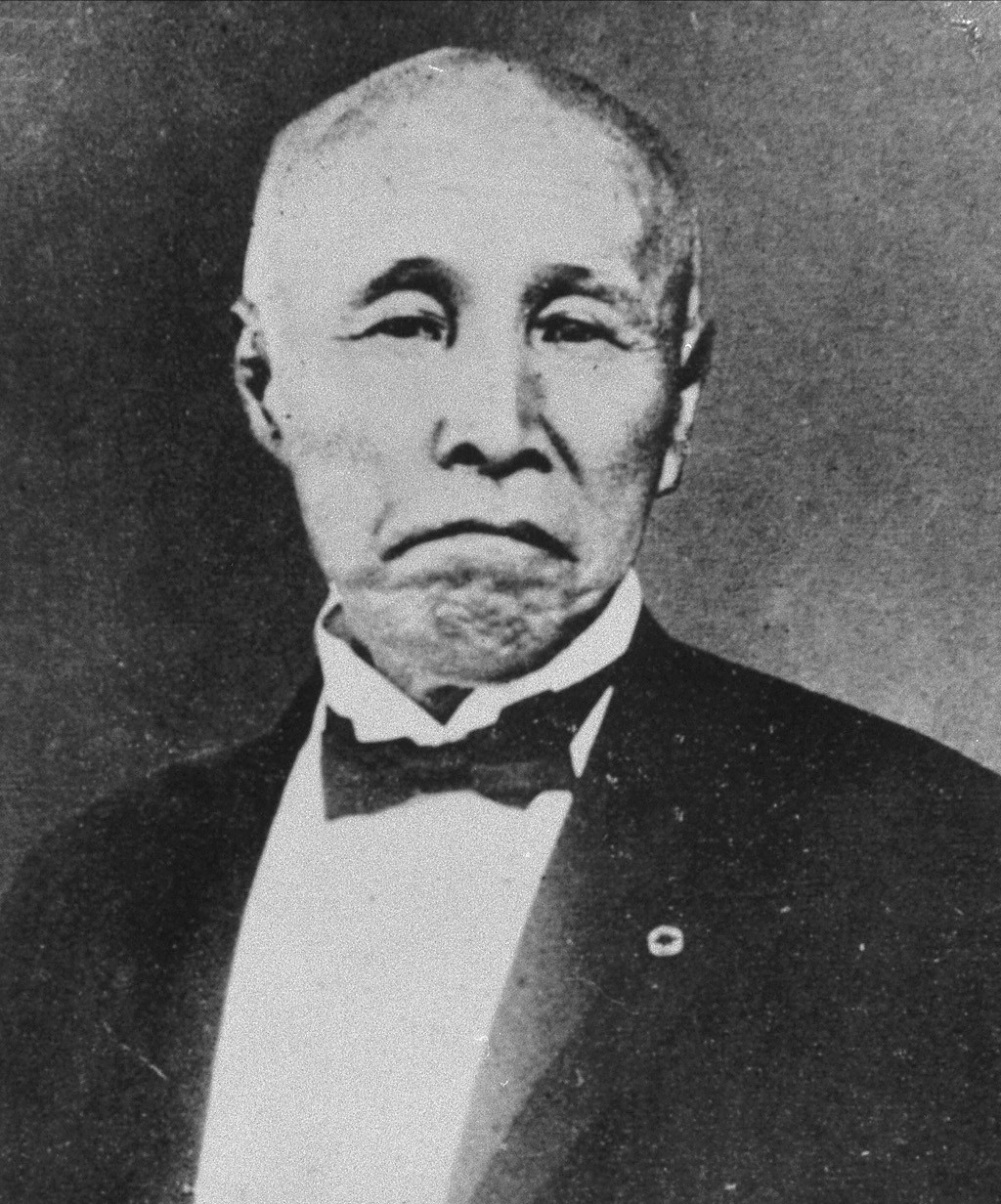
Ōkuma Shigenobu, Prime Minister of Japan

- Ōkuma Shigenobu became the 5th Prime Minister of Japan and the second time in his political career. Shigenobu returned to politics at the request of Emperor Taishō to form a new cabinet after the administration under Yamamoto Gonnohyōe was dissolved earlier in wake of the Siemens scandal.
- The 4th Marine Regiment of the United States Marine Corps was activated in Puget Sound, Washington under the command of Colonel Joseph Henry Pendleton for the purpose of any military engagements in Mexico following the Tampico Affair. The regiment was called into action within weeks to occupy Veracruz, Mexico.
- Bai Lang Rebellion – Regular troops routed the "bandit army" of Bai Yung-chang, known as the "White Wolf," near Sian-Foo in northwest China, killing or wounding some 2,000 men.
- Following a scoreless championship final on April 11, the Scottish Cup was replayed with the Celtic club from Glasgow beating the Hiberian club from Edinburgh 4–1. An estimated 40,000 spectators attended the Scottish football championship.
- Born:
  - John Hodiak, American actor, known for roles in Lifeboat and A Bell for Adano; in Pittsburgh, United States (d. 1955)
  - Qiu Huizuo, Chinese army officer, head of the People's Liberation Army General Logistics Department before being purged during the Cultural Revolution; in Xingguo County, Republic of China (present-day China) (d. 2002)
  - K. H. Ara, Indian painter, member of the Bombay Progressive Artists' Group; as Krishnaji Howlaji Ara, in Bolarum, British India (present-day India) (d. 1985)
  - Hiro Saga, Japanese noble, wife to Prince Pujie, brother to Emperor Puyi, last of the Qing dynasty; in Tokyo, Empire of Japan (present-day Japan) (d. 1987)

== April 17, 1914 (Friday) ==
- Russia formally dissolved the Uryankhay Republic in the Tannu Uriankhai, a region once ruled by the Mongol Empire and later the Qing dynasty, to become a protectorate of the empire. The same day, it formally dissolved the protectorate Uryankhay Krai it had occupied since 1912.
- Michael P. Mahoney, an aggrieved 71-year old citizen of New York City, fired a gun at Mayor John Purroy Mitchel as he was getting into his car to go to lunch. The bullet missed Mitchel and ricocheted off a pedestrian before hitting Frank Polk, the city's corporation counsel, in the chin.
- A bomb destroyed a theater in the seaside resort of Great Yarmouth, England, with local authorities suspecting it was planted by members of the suffragist movement in Britain.
- The Kunstkring Art Gallery in Central Jakarta was inaugurated by Governor General of Dutch Indies Alexander Willem Frederik Idenburg as the overseer. The building was designed by Dutch architect Pieter Adriaan Jacobus Moojen and housed the Kunstkring (Art Circle) until 1936 where after it passed through private and government ownership until its restoration in 2011.
- Born:
  - Red Conkright, American football player, centre for the Chicago Bears, Cleveland Rams, Washington Redskins and Brooklyn Dodgers from 1937 to 1944; as William Franklin Conkright, in Beggs, Oklahoma, United States (d. 1980)
  - Evelyn Furtsch, American runner, gold medalist at the 1932 Summer Olympics; in San Diego, United States (d. 2015)
  - Dovey Johnson Roundtree, American activist, attorney in the Keys v. Carolina Coach Co. civil case that lead to desegregation on the bus system; as Dovey Mae Johnson, in Charlotte, North Carolina, United States (d. 2018)

== April 18, 1914 (Saturday) ==
- The Auckland Exhibition closed in New Zealand.
- The Victorian Farmers' Union was established during a farmers' meeting in Woodend, Victoria, Australia.
- American cargo ship Ohioan was launched by Maryland Steel in Sparrows Point, Maryland for service in the Panama Canal but was later purchased by the United States Navy during World War I.
- The Iwate Light Railway opened new stations in the Iwate Prefecture, Japan, including Haruyama, Tōno, and Kamigō.
- The Italian epic film Cabiria, directed by Giovanni Pastrone, was released. The film followed the adventures of the title heroine who witnessed or got involved in major historic events in the Roman Empire, including Hannibal's crossing of the Alps. It was the first major film to feature the tracking shot, and also the first film screened at the White House.
- The film comedy Mabel at the Wheel, starring Charlie Chaplin and Mabel Normand, who also co-directed with Mack Sennett, was released.

== April 19, 1914 (Sunday) ==
- Victorino Márquez Bustillos became interim President of Venezuela, after Juan Vicente Gómez voluntarily stepped down from office, though he continued to influence government from his home in Maracay until his official return to power in 1922.
- The Rikuu East railroad was extended in Miyagi Prefecture, Japan, with stations Ikezuki and Kawatabi serving the line.
- Swiss cyclist Oscar Egg won the 11th Paris–Tours cycle race in Paris.
- Bishop Johannes von Euch dedicated the opening of St. Lawrence's Church in Roskilde, Denmark.
- The village of Estuary, Saskatchewan was established along the future Canadian Pacific Railway branch line. The town peaked at 800 inhabitants and 163 businesses before a change in the railroad route caused the town to decline, becoming a ghost town by the mid-20th century.
- Died:
  - Frederik Collett, Norwegian painter, famous for his landscape paintings of the region around Lillehammer, Norway (b. 1839)
  - Charles Sanders Peirce, American philosopher, known as "the father of pragmatism" (b. 1839)

== April 20, 1914 (Monday) ==
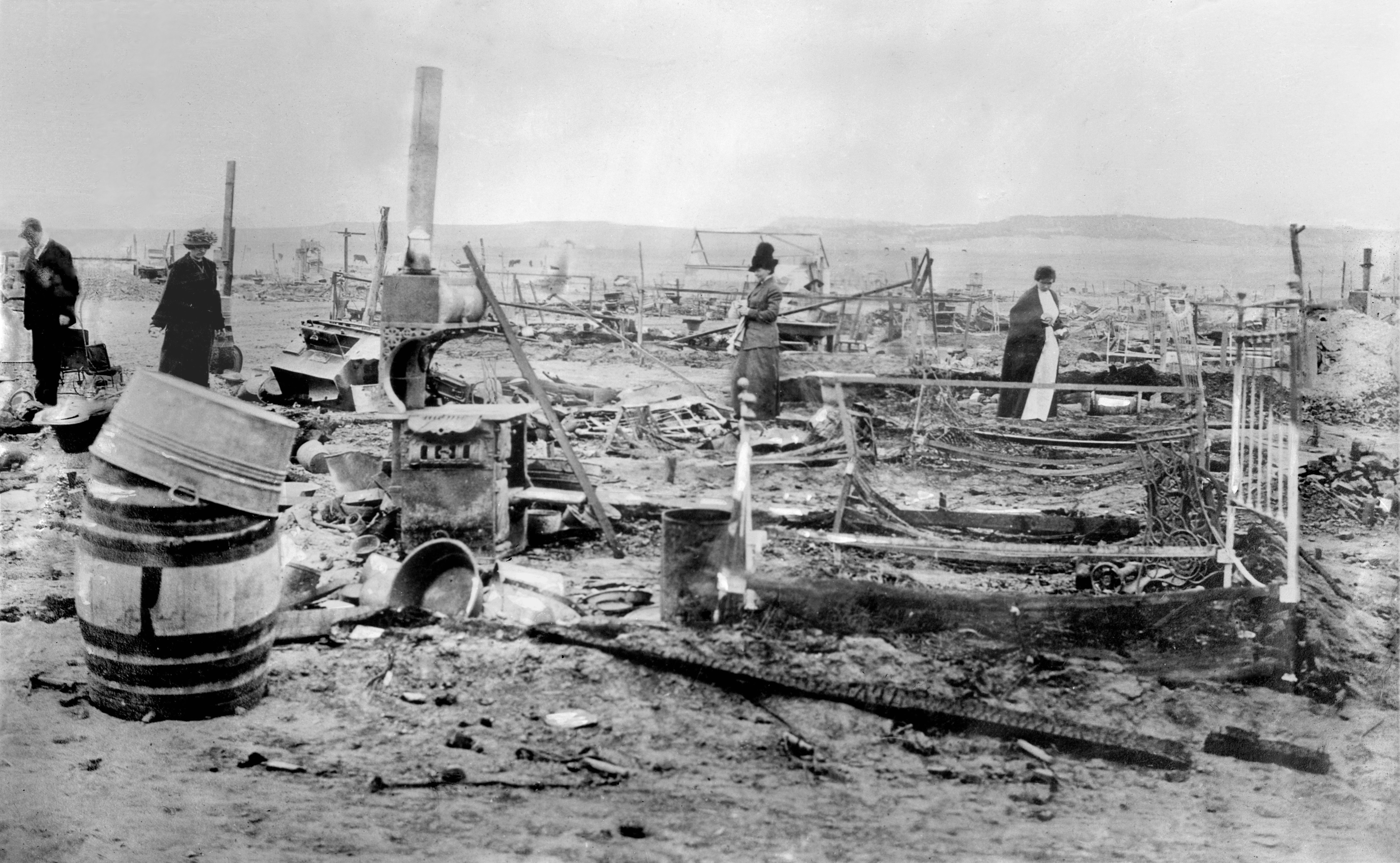
Ruins of labour strike camp in Ludlow, Colorado

- Ludlow Massacre (Colorado Coalfield War) – The Colorado National Guard attacked a tent colony of 1,200 striking coal miners in Ludlow, Colorado, killing 24 people. Among the casualties were labor organizer Louis Tikas, who had been shot three times, and two women and 11 children who were asphyxiated while hiding in a cellar beneath one the camp's main tents that had been set on fire. The mass casualties ignited the Colorado Coalfield War.
- U.S. President Woodrow Wilson asked the United States Congress to use military force in Mexico in reaction to the Tampico Affair.
- Concha Revolution — Soldiers for the government of Ecuador suffered defeat at Camarones, Ecuador, with 500 killed or wounded and another 200 taken prisoner by rebels under the command of Carlos Concha, who had been leading an uprising since the death of President Emilio Estrada Carmona December 21, 1911.
- Steam tug Naramata was launched by the Canadian Pacific Railway to service Okanagan Lake in British Columbia.
- Howard Pixton won the Schneider Trophy air race at Monaco, with a winning average speed of 139.66 km/h (86.78 mph) over the course in a Sopwith Schneider seaplane.
- The association football club Flamengo was established, one of the founding clubs of the Pernambuco State Football Federation in Recife, Brazil.
- British artist Dorothy Shakespear married American poet Ezra Pound at St Mary Abbots on Kensington High Street in London at the behest of family, even though the couple preferred a civil ceremony.
- The Japanese-language novel Kokoro by Natsume Sōseki began its serial run in Asahi Shimbun, one of Japan's national newspapers. The novel chronicles the country's transition from the Meiji period to the modern era through the relationship between a young man and his sensei (mentor).
- Born:
  - Betty Lou Gerson, American actress, best known as the voice of Cruella de Vil in One Hundred and One Dalmatians; in Chattanooga, Tennessee, United States (d. 1999)
  - George Ștefănescu, Romanian artist, known for his collaborations with the National Theatre Bucharest; in Dumbrăveni, Vrancea, Romania (d. 2007)
- Died: Ivar Wickman, Swedish physician, discovered how polio was transferred (committed suicide) (b. 1872)

== April 21, 1914 (Tuesday) ==
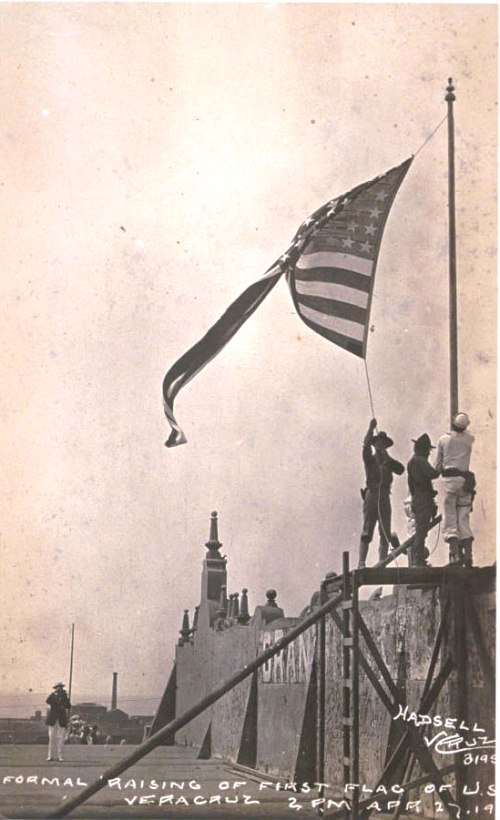
U.S. Marines raise the flag in Veracruz, Mexico at start of occupation

- The United States House of Representatives voted 337 to 37 in favor of employing armed forces in Mexico after fours hours of debate.
- United States occupation of Veracruz – Around 2,300 U.S. Navy sailors and Marines under the command of Rear Admiral Frank Friday Fletcher landed in the port city of Veracruz, Mexico, in response to the Tampico Affair on April 9. Fighting began between American and local Mexican forces by noon.
- The German steamer SS Ypiranga was detained by the United States Navy as it attempted to unload arms for forces under command of Victoriano Huerta in Veracruz. However, since there was no formal blockade during the occupation, the ship's detention was illegal. Subsequently, the steamer was released where it went to a nearby port unoccupied by the U.S. Navy to unload its shipment.
- The association football club Iraty was formed in Irati, becoming the oldest football club in Paraná, Brazil.
- Oliver Hardy made his film debut in the comedy Outwitting Dad, directed by Arthur Hotaling.
- Born: James Henry Quello, American government official, Commissioner of the Federal Communications Commission (FCC) from 1974 to 1993; in Laurium, Michigan, United States (d. 2010)
- Died: Theodore B. Basselin, German-American businessman, created the Lowville and Beaver River Railroad and other companies, established the Basselin Scholarship for Theological College at the Catholic University of America (b. 1851)

== April 22, 1914 (Wednesday) ==
- United States occupation of Veracruz – Street-fighting broke out as the United States Navy and Marines expanded beyond the Veracruz waterfront into the city to ensure American forces could hold the port. By late afternoon, sailors and Marines has taken control of the town centre.
- The destroyer USS McDougal, named in honor of American Civil War navy officer David McDougal, was launched at Bath Iron Works in Bath, Maine. McDougal's granddaughter Marguerite S. LeBreton was the launch's sponsor.
- The Titanic Engineers' Memorial was unveiled by Sir Archibald Denny, president of the Institute of Marine Engineers in Southampton, England to commemorate the engineers who died during the sinking of RMS Titanic on April 15, 1912.
- The men's fraternity Alpha Kappa Lambda was founded by students attending the University of California, Berkeley.
- Babe Ruth pitched his first professional game for the Baltimore Orioles at age 19.
- Born:
  - Baldev Raj Chopra, Indian film and television director, best known for the Mahabharat television series; in Ludhiana, British India (present-day India) (d. 2008)
  - Jan de Hartog, Dutch writer, author of The Fourposter; in Haarlem, Netherlands (d. 2002)
  - Michael Wittmann, German army officer, commander of the 101st SS Heavy Panzer Battalion for the Waffen-SS during World War II, recipient of the Knight's Cross of the Iron Cross; in Vogelthal, German Empire (present-day Dietfurt, Germany) (killed in action, 1944)

== April 23, 1914 (Thursday) ==
- Leo Frank, convicted in the murder of 13-year old Mary Phagan, was awarded a stay of execution and a new hearing by a single justice of the Georgia Supreme Court based on evidence not brought up in the original trial. Despite new evidence brought forward, justice Ben Hill upheld the original court decision and denied Frank a new trial.
- The baseball stadium Weeghman Park, later known as Wrigley Field, opened in Chicago, with the first game played between home team Chicago Whales and visiting Kansas City Packers.
- The first Woolworth store opened in Ireland on Grafton Street in Dublin.
- British author Robert Tressell released his semi-autobiographical novel The Ragged-Trousered Philanthropists.
- Born: Glyn Daniel, Welsh archaeologist, editor of the academic magazine Antiquity from 1958 to 1985; in Pembrokeshire, Wales (d. 1986)
- Died: Solon Spencer Beman, American architect, designer of the Pullman, Chicago community in Illinois (b. 1853)

== April 24, 1914 (Friday) ==
- United States occupation of Veracruz – All fighting between America and Mexican forces in Veracruz ceased, with the United States Navy occupying the city for another six months.
- Larne gun-running – Arms shipments from Germany, including 35,000 rifles and over 3 million rounds of ammunition, landed at Larne, Bangor and Donaghadee, Ireland and were distributed for the Ulster Volunteers using motor vehicles, the first time arms were ever distributed in such a manner.
- Canadian Arctic Expedition – Karluk Captain Robert Bartlett and his Inuk guide Kataktovik reached Emma Town, a Siberian settlement a few miles west of East Cape, 37 days since leaving Wrangel Island where the main party was camped. The two men had traveled about 700 miles (1,100 km), much of it on foot. Robert arranged transit with a local Russian official to take him to Emma Harbour on the coast, a week's journey away, where he could look for a ship to Alaska.
- Physicists James Franck and Gustav Ludwig Hertz presented results of their experiment on electron collisions to the German Physical Society, which revealed the internal quantum levels of atoms.
- Born: William Castle, American filmmaker, most noted for his B-movies including The Tingler, producer of Rosemary's Baby; as William Schloss Jr., in New York City, United States (d. 1977)

== April 25, 1914 (Saturday) ==
- The first combat flight by a U.S. Navy aircraft took place, observing Mexican positions during the United States occupation of Veracruz.
- James Parr was re-elected by acclamation as mayor of Auckland.
- The 10th Marine Regiment of United States Marine Corps was formed in Quantico, Virginia on as an artillery battalion under the 1st Marine Brigade.
- Burnley beat Liverpool 1–0 in the FA Cup Final, with Bert Freeman scoring the game's single goal. It was the last time the FA Cup was played at the Crystal Palace in London. Attendance was high at over 72,000, thanks in part to reigning British monarch King George attending the championship game.
- The Tōkaidō Railroad opened new stations in the Shiga Prefecture, Japan, including Azuchi, Ishiyama and a new replacement for the existing station in Kyōto.
- Born:
  - Marcos Pérez Jiménez, Venezuelan state leader, 51st President of Venezuela; in Táchira, Venezuela (d. 2001)
  - Charles Acton, English-Irish music critic for The Irish Times and member of The Critics' Circle; as Charles Ball-Acton, in Iron Acton, England (d. 1999)
  - John Sebastian, American musician, promoter of the harmonica as a serious instrument, father to songwriter John B. Sebastian; as John Sebastian Pugliese, in Philadelphia, United States (d. 1980)
- Died: Ellen Ternan, English actress, mistress to Charles Dickens (b. 1839)

== April 26, 1914 (Sunday) ==
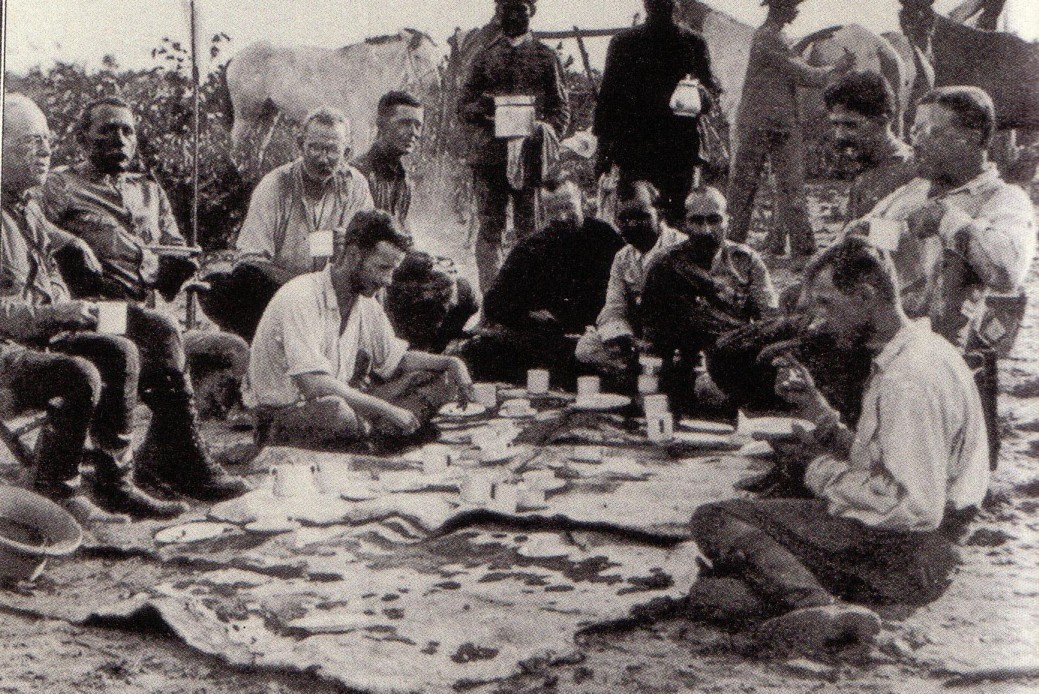
Former U.S. President Theodore Roosevelt, his son Kermit, Brazilian explorer Cândido Rondon and their Amazon expedition party

- France began to hold general elections with final results not tallied until May 10.
- Roosevelt–Rondon Scientific Expedition – Former U.S. President Theodore Roosevelt and Brazilian military officer Cândido Rondon completed their exploration of the River of Doubt (later renamed Roosevelt River) in the Amazon. The expedition achieved its objectives at terrible cost. Three men out of the 16 in the exploration party perished (one through drowning, another by homicide, forcing the party to abandon the third man who committed the act to perish in the jungle). The rest were weakened by starvation and disease. Roosevelt and Rondon credited the help of a team of seringueiros (local Brazilians who harvest rubber from trees for tire manufacturing in North America) for providing needed aid through the last leg of the river to meet their rendezvous with the American-Brazilian relief party which escorted them back to Manaus, Brazil.
- Born:
  - Bernard Malamud, American writer, author of The Fixer and The Natural; in New York City, United States (d. 1986)
  - Lilian Rolfe, French secret agent in World War II, in Paris, worked in France behind enemy lines until her capture in 1944; in Paris, France (executed, 1945)
  - James Rouse, American real estate developer, founder of The Rouse Company; in Easton, Maryland, United States (d. 1996)
- Died: Eduard Suess, Austrian geologist, first proposed the supercontinent Gondwana (b. 1831)

== April 27, 1914 (Monday) ==
- The Russian steamer Kometa exploded off the coast of Algeria, killing half of the 30-man crew and injuring nine more.
- Born:
  - Albert Soboul, Algerian-French historian, specialized in the French Revolution and Napoleonic periods; in Ammi Moussa, French Algeria (present-day Algeria) (d. 1982)
  - Joseph Harold Moore, American air force officer, leader of Operation Rolling Thunder during the Vietnam War; in Florence, South Carolina, United States (d. 2006)

== April 28, 1914 (Tuesday) ==
- A coal mine explosion in Eccles, West Virginia killed over 180 miners, the second worst mining disaster in the state's history. Mine investigators concluded a flame from a carbide lamp touched off a pocket of coal gas, which set up a chain reaction of explosions throughout the mine. Official records of the disaster contradict exact casualties, with the number ranging from 180 to 186 dead.
- Colorado Coalfield War – U.S. President Woodrow Wilson ordered federal troops to Colorado at the request of state governor Elias M. Ammons to restore order after ten days of fighting between coal mine strikers and the Colorado National Guard.
- Two dioceses were established in Africa: the Roman Catholic Diocese of Nkongsamba in what is now Cameroon, and the Roman Catholic Diocese of Djibouti in Djibouti.
- New Jersey boroughs Westville and Stone Harbor were incorporated.
- British suffragettes Hilda Burkitt and Florence Tunks burned down the Felixstow Bath Hotel in Suffolk, England as part of a series of violent actions during the "Votes For Women" Campaign. There were no occupants in the hotel. Both women were arrested and given prison sentences on May 29.
- Died: Thomas G. Jones, American politician, 28th Governor of Alabama (b. 1844)

== April 29, 1914 (Wednesday) ==
- Colorado Coalfield War – Fifteen people were killed in clashes between striking miners, mine guard and state militia on the final day of the labor dispute for the Colorado coalfields as federal troops arrived, upon which hundreds of striking miners laid down their arms and ended the violence.
- Incumbent Duncan McFarlane retained his seat as mayor of Invercargill, New Zealand over challenger and previous mayor William Ott.
- The Kita-Matsue rail line opened in Shimane Prefecture, Japan, with stations Tabushi, Takeshi, and Unshū-Hirata serving the line.
- A scientific expedition to the western half of Sumatra collected specimens of a unique species of muntjac (a type of deer) later called the Sumatran Muntjac. The animal was later sighted in the 1930s and early 2000s.
- Born: Johnny Dio, American gangster, Lucchese crime family capo and Murder, Inc. member; as Giovanni Dioguardi, in New York City, United States (d. 1979)

== April 30, 1914 (Thursday) ==
- American cargo ship Benjamin Noble foundered in Lake Superior, with all 16 crew lost.
- Grande Prairie, Alberta was incorporated as a village.
- Osaka Electric Tramway opened the Nara and Osaka rail lines in Japan, with stations Ishikiri, Hiraoka, Hyōtan-yama, Ikoma, Kawachi-Hanazono, Nara, Ōtsumachi, Ōsaka Uehommachi, Tomio, Tsuruhashi, Wakae-Iwata and Yamato-Saidaiji serving the line.
- Born: Dorival Caymmi, Brazilian musician, considered one the founders of the bossa nova movement; in Salvador, Bahia, Brazil (d. 2008)
- Died: Sarah Herring Sorin, American lawyer, first woman to practice law in Arizona and first woman to appear before the Supreme Court of the United States as an independent attorney (b. 1861)
