= March 1914 =

Month of 1914

<<	March 1914					>>
Su	Mo	Tu	We	Th	Fr	Sa
1	2	3	4	5	6	7
8	9	10	11	12	13	14
15	16	17	18	19	20	21
22	23	24	25	26	27	28
29	30	31

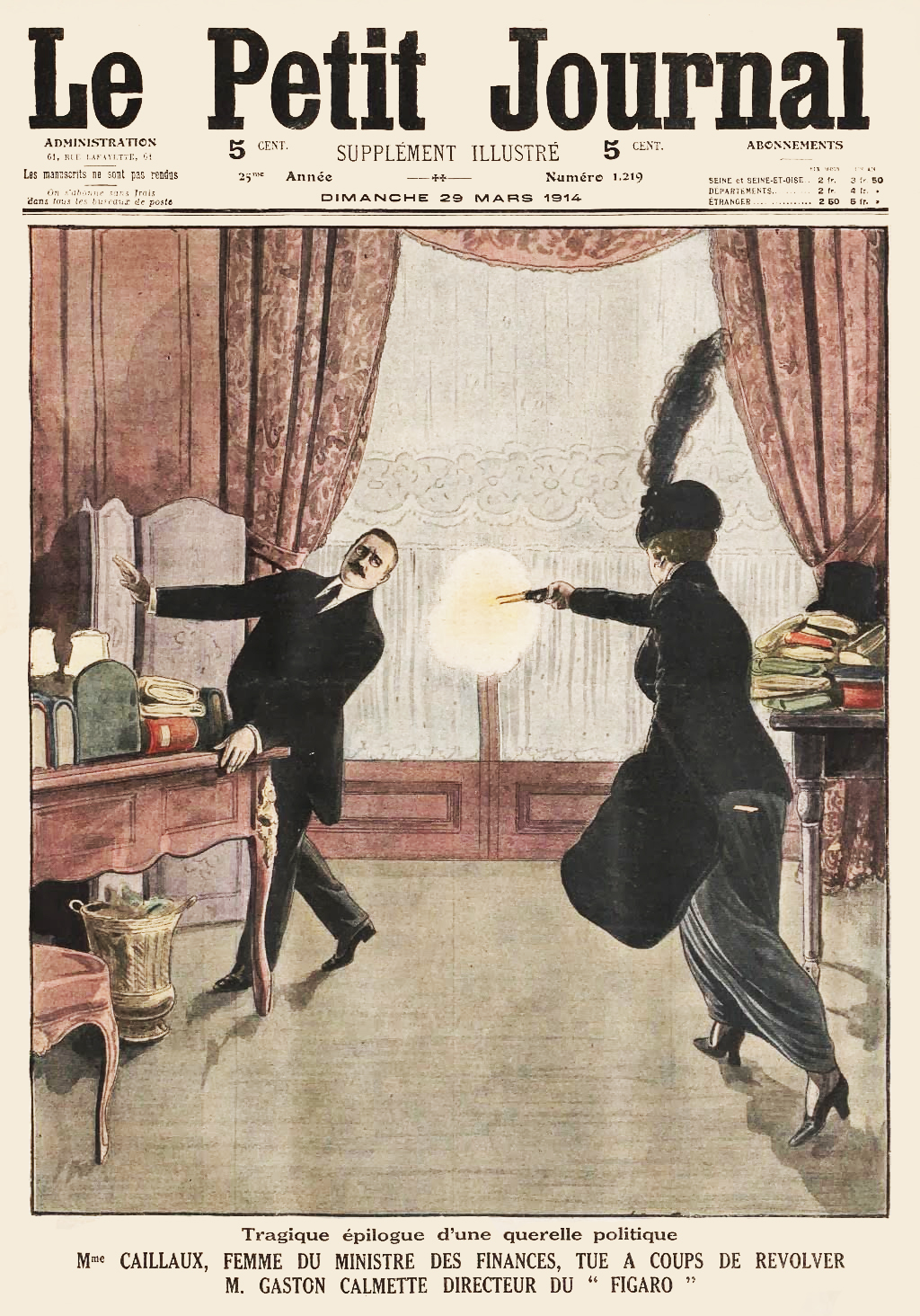
French journalist Gaston Calmette assassinated by Henriette Caillaux, Le Petit Journal, issue March 29, 1914

The following events occurred in March 1914:

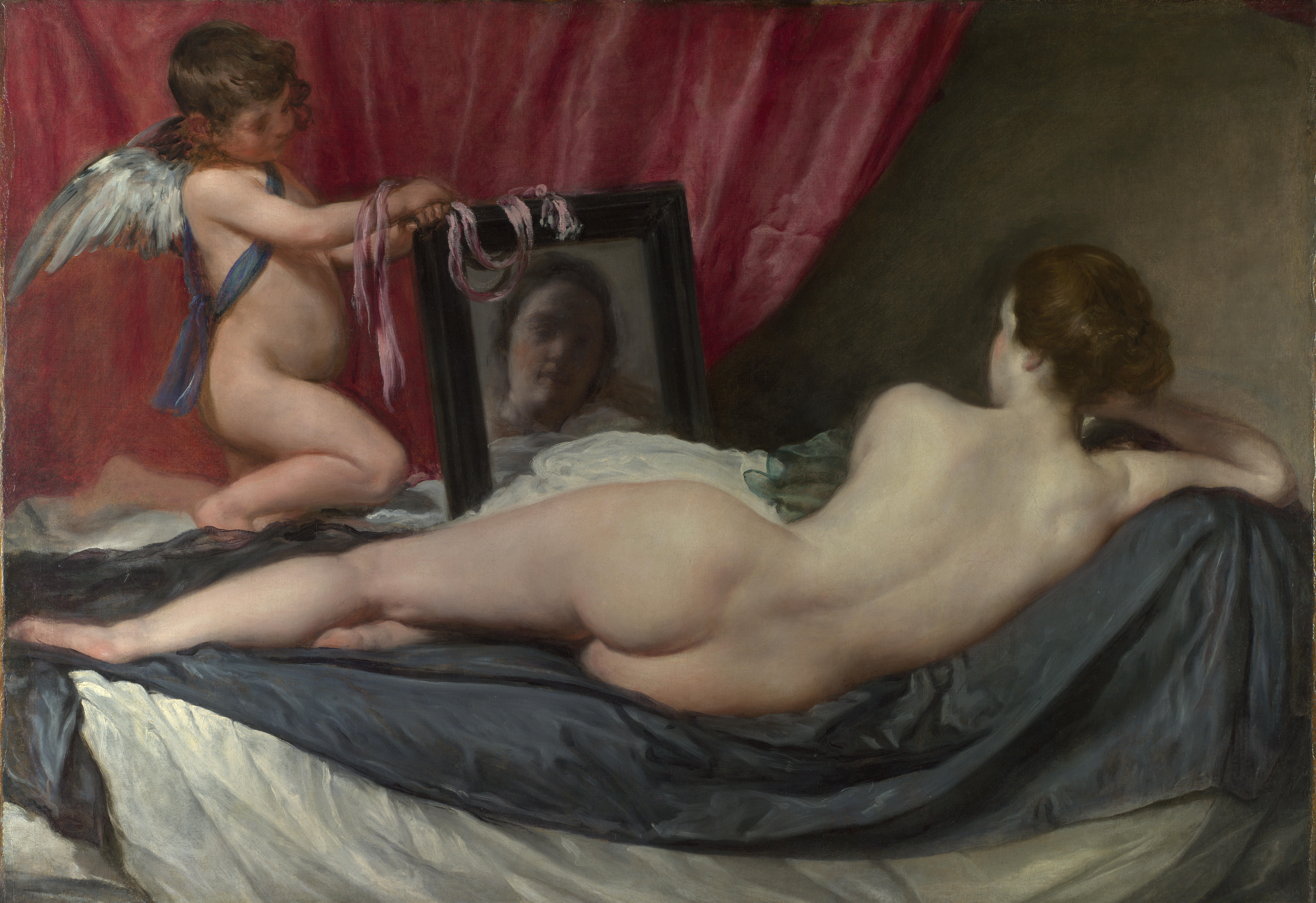
Rokeby Venus, painted by Diego Velázquez. National Gallery, London. Suffragist Mary Richardson vandalized it with a meat cleaver on March 10 to protest the arrest of suffragist leader Emmeline Pankhurst.

== March 1, 1914 (Sunday) ==
- Venceslau Brás of the Minas Republican Party won by a landslide over Ruy Barbosa of the Liberal Republican Party in the presidential election for Brazil, securing over 90 per cent of the vote. He would officially take office of the President in November.
- Venustiano Carranza, leader of the Constitutional Army in Mexico, halted continued public inquiry into the death of British rancher William S. Benton (allegedly shot and killed in Pancho Villa's office), citing any further investigations into Benton's death should be made through him and not through Villa.
- The Republic of China joined the Universal Postal Union.
- Argentine pioneering aviator Jorge Newbery was killed in a crash at Estancia "Los Tamarindos" while performing aerobatics prior to an attempt to cross the Andes by air.
- The Port Sunlight railway station opened on the Wirral Peninsula in England, initially a private station for workmen on the Birkenhead Railway.
- The Independent Artists Society held their spring exhibit in Paris, featuring the public debut of new artworks including Le Fumeur by Jean Metzinger.
- The first issue of The Little Review, edited by Margaret C. Anderson, was released, with Anderson calling for a new form of criticism for art in the first issue's editorial: “Criticism as an art has not flourished in this country. We live too swiftly to have time to be appreciative; and criticism, after all, has only one synonym: appreciation.”
- The Schiltigheim football association club was formed in Schiltigheim, Alsace when the region was still part of Germany. When Alsace became part of France in 1919, the club was renamed to reflect the region's change in sovereignty.
- The German association football club Mechtersheim was formed in Mechtersheim, Germany (now the municipality of Römerberg).
- Born: Harry Caray, American baseball broadcaster, who covered the St. Louis Cardinals, Oakland Athletics, Chicago White Sox, and Chicago Cubs; as Harry Carabina, in St. Louis, United States (d. 1998)
- Died: Gilbert Elliot-Murray-Kynynmound, British colonial leader, 17th Governor-General of India, 8th Governor General of Canada (b. 1845)

== March 2, 1914 (Monday) ==
- Around a dozen people perished in a brutal blizzard that struck Pennsylvania, New York City and Long Island. Heavy snow cut off crucial services in Scranton, Pennsylvania and stranded 4,000 parishioners overnight at an evangelical event. Blinding snow halted trains to Brooklyn, in one case stranding 200 passengers overnight at a Long Island train station.
- The Swedish sports club Enköping, which encompasses association football and ice hockey, was formed in Enköping, Sweden.
- Born:
  - Martin Ritt, American film-maker, director of Hud and Norma Rae; in New York City, United States (d. 1990)
  - Louis Chaillot, French cyclist, gold and silver medalist at the 1932 Summer Olympics and bronze medalist at the 1936 Summer Olympics; in Chaumont, Haute-Marne, France (d. 1998)

== March 3, 1914 (Tuesday) ==
- Sixteen people in Madagascar were killed after a cyclone created a storm surge that smashed settlements on the northwest region of the island.
- The Roman Catholic Diocese of El Paso was established, covering nearly 65,000 square miles (170,000 km^{2}) in West Texas and southern New Mexico.
- The English cricket team won the Test series 4-0 with one match drawn in South Africa.
- Born:
  - Asger Jorn, Danish painter and sculpture, founding member of the avant-garde movement COBRA and the Situationist International; as Asger Jørgensen, in Vejrum, Denmark (d. 1973)
  - Charlotte Henry, American actress, best known for lead roles in Alice in Wonderland and Babes in Toyland; in New York City, United States (d. 1980)
  - Puttaraj Gawai, Indian musician who performed Hindustani classical music; as Puttayya Gawayigalu, in Gadag-Betageri, British India (present-day India) (d. 2010)

== March 4, 1914 (Wednesday) ==
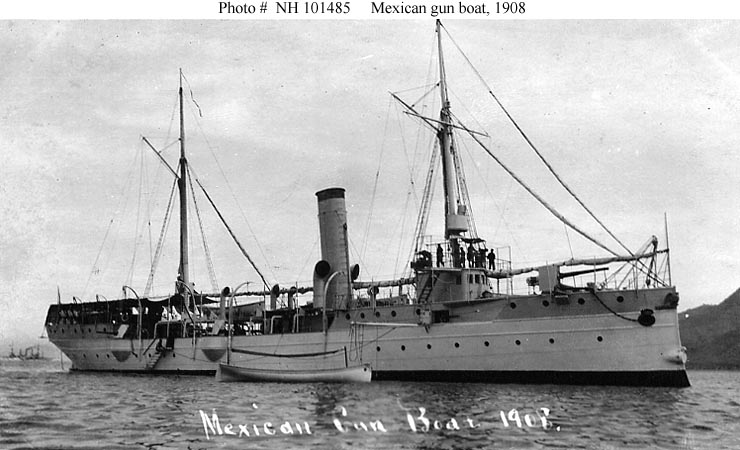
Mexican Navy gunboat Tampico

- First Battle of Topolobampo – Mexican naval gunboats Guerrero and Morelos clashed with the mutinous Tampico in a bay near Topolobampo, Mexico. Remarkably, despite rounds discharged from all three ships' 4-inch guns, neither side hit their targets. Tampico was able to escape both ships by entering the Topolobampo harbor.
- The railway line between Marsala and Frankfort, South Africa opened.
- A British-American commission into the death of rancher William S. Benton formally dissolved, citing any opportunity to exhume and examine the body had disappeared. The group did not express confidence in the three-man commission set up by Mexican rebel leader Venustiano Carranza to investigate Benton's death, allegedly shot by Pancho Villa, since the northern Mexican rebel leader has put his support behind Carranza.
- The first issue of New Numbers (dated February) was issued, a quarterly collection of work by the Dymock poets in England edited by Lascelles Abercrombie. The literary magazine only lasted a year but featured work from renowned poets as Abercrombie, Robert Frost, Rupert Brooke, Edward Thomas, Wilfrid Wilson Gibson, and John Drinkwater.
- The Bondebladet newspaper was formed for farmers and rural residents in Voss and Bergen, Norway, before becoming a regional paper in 1921. The paper folded in 1935.
- Born:
  - Ward Kimball, American animator, one of Walt Disney's Nine Old Men; in Minneapolis, United States (d. 2002)
  - Robert R. Wilson, American physicist, member of the Manhattan Project; in Frontier, Wyoming, United States (d. 2000)
  - Barbara Newhall Follett, American writer, noted for producing published novels in her early teens including The House Without Windows; in Hanover, New Hampshire, United States (disappeared, 1939)

== March 5, 1914 (Thursday) ==
- U.S. President Woodrow Wilson appeared before United States Congress to repeal the exemption for American ships from paying tolls when using the Panama Canal.
- An avalanche killed 17 soldiers within Austria-Hungary during maneuvers on Ortler, the highest mountain in the Eastern Alps.
- The Gusar rowing club was formed in Split, Croatia, eventually becoming one of the best rowing clubs with members winning numerous Olympic and World Championship medals.
- Born:
  - He Zehui, Chinese physicist, key pioneer in nuclear physics research and arms development for China; in Suzhou, Republic of China (present-day China) (d. 2011)
  - Philip Farkas, American musician, noted French horn player for the Chicago Symphony Orchestra, author of The Art of French Horn Playing; in Chicago, United States (d. 1992)
- Died: Frederic M. Halford, British angler, developed dry fly fishing (b. 1844)

== March 6, 1914 (Friday) ==
- James William Humphrys Scotland, the second New Zealander to gain a pilot's license in England, completed the cross-country flight in New Zealand in a Caudron biplane.
- The professional Serbian association football club Vojvodina was founded in Novi Sad, Vojvodina, Serbia by a group of students of the Serbian Orthodox high school. The club was formed in secrecy due to a ban by Austro-Hungarian authorities on larger organized gatherings of juveniles in the Vojvodina region. The club went on to become one of the most successful football clubs in the former Yugoslavia and Serbia.
- The recently formed sports club Halmstad was allowed membership to Riksidrottsförbundet, the Swedish Sports Confederation.
- World Baseball Tour – Thousands of baseball fans greeted the New York Giants and the Chicago White Sox as both professional baseball teams arrived on the RMS Lusitania, officially ending their five-month international sports demonstration tour.
- Born:
  - Kirill Kondrashin, Russian conductor, artistic director of the Moscow Philharmonic Orchestra from 1960 to 1975 before defecting; in Moscow, Russian Empire (present-day Russia) (d. 1981)
  - Harold Alfond, American businessman, founder of the Dexter Shoe Company; in Swampscott, Massachusetts, United States (d. 2007)
- Died: George Washington Vanderbilt II, American businessman, steamboat and railroad baron (b. 1862)

== March 7, 1914 (Saturday) ==
- Prince William of Wied arrived in Albania to begin what was ultimately to be a six-month reign of the Balkan country, while outlawing the sovereignty of the Republic of Central Albania created by Ottoman army officer and politician Essad Pasha Toptani in Durrës to oppose the Provisional Government of Albania.
- With all state appeals lost, the execution of Leo Frank, convicted in the murder of 13-year old Mary Phagan, was set on his birthday, April 17.
- The Kenya Indian Congress was established in British East Africa.
- The body of Texas rancher Clemente Vergara was finally recovered in Mexico and delivered to his relatives in Laredo, Texas. Vergara was last seen alive on February 13 as he was taken into custody by Mexican federal troops and held at a garrison in Hidalgo, Coahuila, Mexico. An autopsy on the body confirmed Vergara was shot twice in the head and in the neck, and his skull was crushed, likely from a rifle butt. Conflicting reports about how the body was recovered made headlines across the United States. The New York Times initially reported Texas Rangers had crossed the border and retrieved the body from a shallow grave in the Hidalgo cemetery, but uncovered later sources maintaining the body had been found by the bank of the Rio Grande after the Vergara family had paid for its recovery.
- The American edition of Henry James' autobiography Notes of a Son and Brother was published in hard copy by Charles Scribner's Sons in New York City.
- Born: Stephen McNichols, American politician, 35th Governor of Colorado; in Denver, United States (d. 1997)
- Died: George William Ross, Canadian politician, 5th Premier of Ontario (b. 1841)

== March 8, 1914 (Sunday) ==
- Spain held general elections to the Cortes Generales, with all 408 seats in the Congress of Deputies in competition. Under the customary system of Turno Pacifico, a long-standing power-sharing arrangement, the elections served as a rubber stamp for a routine handover of power initiated by the King of Spain. As expected, election results sanctioned the prearranged handover from the Liberals to the Conservatives.
- The Taitung rail line was extended in Taiwan with the addition of the Fuyuan and Wanrong stations.
- The first edition of Workers' Dreadnought appeared on the fifth annual International Women's Day as Women's Dreadnought, with a circulation of 30 000. The paper was started by women's suffrage leader Sylvia Pankhurst and her contemporaries Mary Patterson and Zelie Emerson on behalf of the East London Federation of Suffragettes. The newspaper was renamed Workers in 1917 as the official weekly organ of the Communist Party, with Pankhurst continuing as editor until 1924.
- The Russian women's journal Rabotnitsa (The Woman Worker) was published on the fifth annual International Women's Day and remains one of the longest running and most politically left of the women's periodicals.
- The London Group held their first exhibition at the Goupil Gallery.
- Pioneering film company Biograph premiered their first feature film Judith of Bethulia, starring Blanche Sweet in the title role and Henry B. Walthall, and produced and directed by D. W. Griffith. Based on the biblical Book of Judith, the film featured famous movie actress siblings Lillian and Dorothy Gish in supporting roles and a controversial orgy scene.
- Badminton player Guy A. Sautter, under the alias of U N Lappin, successfully defended his title in the men's singles at the All England Badminton Championships, beating challenger Frank Chesterton 15–4 and 15–10 in the final.
- Born:
  - Yakov Zeldovich, Russian physicist, key developer of Soviet nuclear and thermonuclear weapons; in Minsk, Russian Empire (present-day Belarus) (d. 1987)
  - Frank Soo, English association football player, midfielder for the England national football team from 1942 to 1945, Stoke City and Luton from 1933 to 1950; in Buxton, England (d. 1991)

== March 9, 1914 (Monday) ==
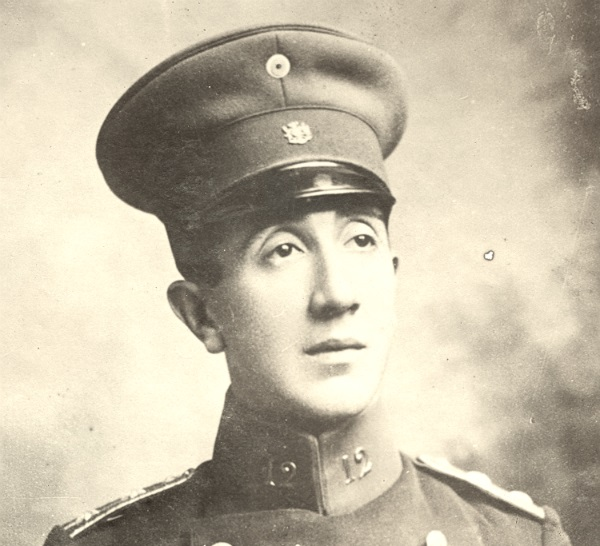
Chilean pilot Alejandro Bello

- Jesús Salgado, under orders by Emiliano Zapata, surrounded Chilpancingo, the capital of Guerrero, Mexico with an armed force of 5,000 men.
- British Prime Minister H. H. Asquith proposed to allow the Ulster counties to hold a vote on whether or not to join a Home Rule parliament in Dublin.
- A fire at the Missouri Athletic Club in St. Louis killed 30 people. The fire started in the lower levels of the seven-storey building, forcing guests to the upper floors, where many escaped using red-hot fire escapes or jumping, causing many injuries and two deaths.
- Chilean pilot Alejandro Bello disappeared while flying a Sánchez-Besa biplane over the central region of Chile as part of a flight exam for military service. Search and rescue could not locate any wreckage in the area, leading to theories he may have crashed while over the sea. Search expeditions as recent as 1988 have failed to turn up any evidence of a plane crash (In 2007, metal fragments belonging to an aircraft were found in the hills near Cuncumén, Chile but could not be conclusively matched to the aircraft Bello flew when he disappeared). His disappearance became a popular topic in South American popular fiction.
- Wyndham Lewis and other fellow artists from the Omega Workshops opened the rival Rebel Art Centre to the London public in what became a four-month run.
- Born: Al Ullman, American politician, U.S. Representative from Oregon from 1957 to 1981; as Albert Ullman, in Great Falls, Montana, United States (d. 1986)
- Died: José Luciano de Castro, Portuguese state leader, 38th, 43rd and 45th Prime Minister of Portugal (b. 1834)

== March 10, 1914 (Tuesday) ==
Damage sustained in the attack by Mary Richardson on the Rokeby Venus in the National Gallery.

- Suffragette Mary Richardson used a meat chopper to deface the Velázquez' painting Rokeby Venus on display in the National Gallery in London to protest the imprisonment of Emmeline Pankhurst, chief founder of the Women's Social and Political Union in Great Britain.
- Koopmans-de Wet House, an historic 18th-century house in Cape Town, South Africa, officially opened as a museum. The house museum would be declared a national monument in 1940.
- Born: Michael Torrens-Spence, British air force officer, held commissions in the Royal Navy Fleet Air Arm, the Royal Air Force, the British Army, Ulster Special Constabulary and Ulster Defence Regiment; as Frederick Michael Alexander Torrens-Spence, in White Abbey, Ireland (d. 2001)

== March 11, 1914 (Wednesday) ==
- A reported force of 400 to 500 "brigands" ransacked Laohekou, Hubei, China, stealing 700 rifles, several field guns, and ammunition. The militia looted and burned several public buildings, shot and killed a Norwegian missionary and wounded several others before leaving the city.
- Royal Navy gunship HMS Boscawen caught fire and sank on the River Tyne at North Shields, England.
- The Nigerian Baptist Convention was established in Ibadan, Nigeria.
- Born:
  - Élisabeth Boselli, French air force officer, first women to serve as a pilot in the French Air Force; in Paris, France (d. 2005)
  - Álvaro del Portillo, Spanish clergy, prelate of Opus Dei between 1982 and 1994, beatified by Pope Francis in 2014; in Madrid, Spain (d. 1994)

== March 12, 1914 (Thursday) ==
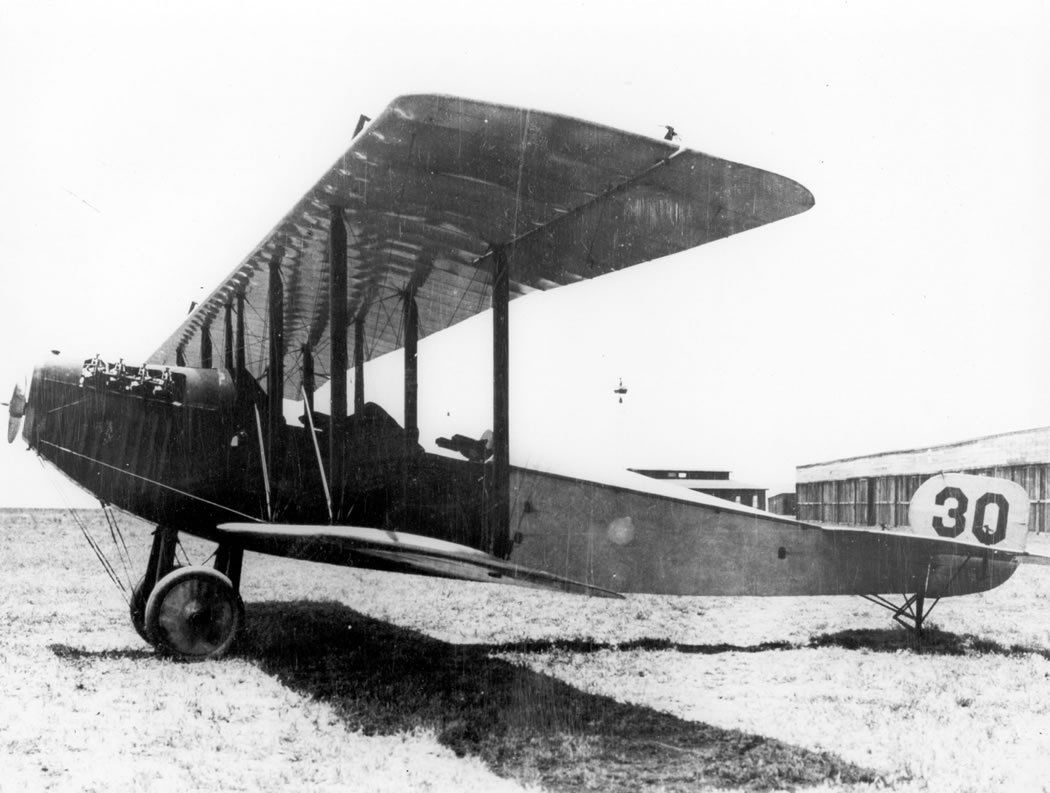
Curtiss Model J aircraft

- Canadian Arctic Expedition – Survivors of the Karluk shipwreck in the Arctic reached Wrangel Island where most would remain until rescue in August. In a correspondence to a friend from Dawson City, Yukon, expedition leader Vilhjalmur Stefansson, who had been separated from the ship back in September, speculated the Karluk was still intact and would drift in the ice to the north pole, "if she escapes being crushed by ice."
- The Curtiss Model J aircraft completed its first test flight before it was delivered to the Aviation Section of the U.S. Army Signal Corps.
- The Central Uruguay Railway Cricket Club in Montevideo changed its name to Peñarol to reflect its shift from cricket to association football.
- A partial lunar eclipse was observed in most of the Western Hemisphere.
- Born: Julia Lennon, English matriarch, mother to Beatles star John Lennon; as Julia Stanley, in Liverpool, England (d. 1958)
- Died: George Westinghouse, American entrepreneur, inventor of the railway air brake (b. 1846)

== March 13, 1914 (Friday) ==
- An Italian military column repelled an attack of 2,000 Arab tribesmen near Tripoli, killing 263 attackers while losing 42 soldiers and two officers, with another 100 wounded.
- Second Battle of Topolobampo — The rebel gunboat Tampico clashed with Mexican naval gunboats Guerrero and Morelos as the renegade vessel attempted to break out Topolobampo harbor. Tampico initially concentrated most of its fire on Morelos but was in danger of hitting the US naval cruiser USS New Orleans that was observing nearby. Tampico started firing on Guerrero instead before retreating back into the harbor safely.
- Fourteen people were killed in a railway accident at the Exeter railway station in New South Wales, Australia.
- British judge Thomas Warrington ruled in the Barron v Potter case that in the event of a deadlock with the board of directors, power reverted to the annual general meeting. The ruling in the case still stands as precedence for the balance of the power between the board and annual general meeting.
- The British edition of Henry James' autobiography Notes of a Son and Brother was published in hard copy by Macmillan and Co. in London.
- The Klamath Republican newspaper ceased publication in Klamath Falls, Oregon.
- Born:
  - Edward O'Hare, American air force officer, commander of Fighter Squadron Three during World War II, two-time recipient of the Distinguished Flying Cross, Navy Cross, and Medal of Honor; in St. Louis, United States (missing in action, 1943)
  - Saroj Dutta, Indian Communist Leader, active in the extremist Naxalite movement in West Bengal in the 1960s; in East Bengal, British India (present-day Bangladesh) (d. 1971)
  - W. O. Mitchell, Canadian writer and broadcaster, author of Who Has Seen the Wind; as William Ormond Mitchell, in Weyburn, Saskatchewan, Canada (d. 1998)
- Died:
  - John L. Leal, American physician, developed the first water system treated with chlorine in Jersey City, New Jersey (b. 1858)
  - Hakeem Noor-ud-Din, Indian religious leader, leader of the Ahmadiyya movement in 1908 to 1914 (b. 1841)

== March 14, 1914 (Saturday) ==
- An estimated 1,000 people in half a dozen Russian villages were drowned from flooding caused by water spouts on Sea of Azov creating high waves that traveled far inland. Casualties also included 128 railway workers who drowned after a wave hit their work camp. The violent storm also caused a dam to burst and flood the nearby city of Temyryuk.
- A magnitude 7.0 earthquake struck Akita Prefecture, Honshu, Japan, killing 94 people and destroying 640 homes.
- Ireland clinched the British Home Championship title in association football following a 1–1 draw with Scotland at Windsor Park, aggregating five points total in the championship. Scotland eventually finished as runners up, beating England 3–1 at Hampden Park in April. The trophy was not competed for the next six years due to World War I.
- The Italian football association club Entella, named after the river that flowed through Chiavari, Italy, was formed. The club went bankrupt in 2001 and re-formed as Unione Sportiva Valle Sturla Entella before it was renamed in its present form Virtus Entella in 2010.
- The Alishan Forest Railway opened in Taiwan, with stations Shenmu and Zhaoping serving the line.
- Born:
  - Abdias do Nascimento, Brazilian scholar, actor, artist and politician, member of "Santa Irmandad Orquidea" ["Holy Brotherhood of the Orchid"] poet group, Federal Deputy of Rio de Janeiro from 1983 to 1987 and Senator of Rio de Janeiro from 1997 to 1999; in Franca, Brazil (d. 2011)
  - Hubert Zemke, American air force officer, commander of the 56th Fighter Group during World War II, eight-time recipient of the Distinguished Flying Cross, four-time recipient of the Air Medal, two-time recipient of the Silver Star, and Distinguished Service Cross; in Missoula, Montana, United States (d. 1994)
  - Bill Owen, English actor, best known for the role Compo in the British TV series Last of the Summer Wine; as William John Owen Rowbotham, in London, England (d. 1999)
  - Lee Hays, American singer and songwriter, member of the folk singing group The Weavers, co-author of songs "If I Had a Hammer", and "Kisses Sweeter than Wine"; in Little Rock, Arkansas, United States (d. 1981)

== March 15, 1914 (Sunday) ==
- Albanian Prime Minister Turhan Pasha Përmeti formed the third Council of Ministers of Albania.
- The cover price of The Times was halved to one penny.
- Archbishop John O'Reily dedicated the opening of St Patrick's Church in Adelaide, Australia.
- Born:
  - Joe E. Ross, television actor best known for The Phil Silvers Show and Car 54, Where Are You?; as Joseph Roszawikz, in New York City, United States (d. 1982)
  - Aniello Dellacroce, American mobster, underboss for the Gambino crime family; in New York City, United States (d. 1985)
- Died: Augustus Louis Chetlain, American military officer, commander of the 12th Illinois Infantry Regiment for the Union Army during the American Civil War (b. 1824)

== March 16, 1914 (Monday) ==
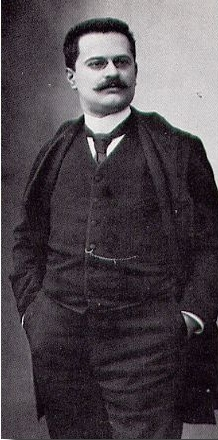
Gaston Calmette

- Henriette Caillaux, wife of French minister Joseph Caillaux, shot and killed Gaston Calmette, editor of Le Figaro, in his office, after fearing Calmette would publish letters showing she and Caillaux were romantically involved during his first marriage. She was acquitted on July 28.
- The Usher Hall opened in Edinburgh with composer Hamish MacCunn conducting the inaugural symphony performance.
- The Broadway musical The Crinoline Girl, written by Julian Eltinge, Otto Harbach, and Percy Wenrich, premiered at the Knickerbocker Theatre in New York City and ran until the end of May.
- Born:
  - Charles Crombie, Australian air force pilot, commander of the No. 176 Squadron during World War II, recipient of the Distinguished Service Order and Distinguished Flying Cross, in Brisbane (killed in plane crash, 1945)
  - Arkady Chernyshev, Russian icehockey player and coach, coach of the Soviet Union national ice hockey team; in Moscow, Russian Empire (present-day Russia) (d. 1992)
- Died:
  - Charles Albert Gobat, Swiss politician, recipient of the Nobel Peace Prize for leadership of the International Peace Bureau (b. 1843)
  - John Murray, Canadian-Scottish marine biologist and oceanographer, considered the father of modern oceanography, killed in an auto accident (b. 1841)

== March 17, 1914 (Tuesday) ==
- A massive celebration marked the arrival of the first train on the newly constructed Kansas City Southern Railway line in Hot Springs, Arkansas.
- British cargo ship Rosalind ran aground near Sambro, Nova Scotia. The entire crew were rescued but the ship was total loss.
- The Italian epic opera I Mori di Valenza by composer Amilcare Ponchielli and based on the expulsion of descendants of the Moors in 17th-century Spain, debuted at the Théâtre du Casino (now the Opéra de Monte-Carlo in Monaco).
- The farcical play A Pair of Sixes by Edward Peple debuted on Broadway at the Longacre Theatre in Manhattan and achieved over two hundred runs before closing in September.
- Born:
  - Sammy Baugh, American football player, quarterback for the Washington Redskins from 1937 to 1952; as Samuel Baugh, in Temple, Texas, United States (d. 2008)
  - Juan Carlos Onganía, Argentine state leader, 35th President of Argentina, part of the de facto military junta of the 1960s and 1970s; as Juan Carlos Onganía Carballo, in Marcos Paz, Buenos Aires, Argentina (d. 1995)
- Died: Antun Gustav Matoš, Croatian poet and author writer, considered champion of Croatian modernist literature (b. 1873)

== March 18, 1914 (Wednesday) ==
- An estimated 3,000 people were reported drowned in a fishing village located at the mouth of the Don River following a fierce storm that swept over Russia.
- Canadian Arctic Expedition – Captain Robert Bartlett of the shipwreck Karluk left survivors on Wrangel Island accompanied by one of the Inuit guides on the expedition to look for signs of the other parties that went out earlier. With no sign of them, the pair turned south and reached landfall on the Siberian coast by April 4, where Bartlett was able to locate help and arrange rescue for the remaining survivors.
- Elections were held in Southern Rhodesia to fill 12 elected positions in the Legislative Council, together with six members nominated by the British South Africa Company, and the Administrator of Southern Rhodesia.
- Born: Gurbaksh Singh Dhillon, Indian army officer, one of the defendants in the Indian National Army trials at the end of World War II (d. 2006)
- Died: Adolph Francis Alphonse Bandelier, Swiss-American archaeologist, expert on Native American cultures in southwestern United States, Mexico, and South America; Bandelier National Monument in New Mexico is named after him (b. 1840)

== March 19, 1914 (Thursday) ==
- A ferry boat carrying 50 passengers and a naval ship collided in Venice, resulting in 14 deaths.
- The Royal Ontario Museum opened to the public in Toronto.
- The Toronto Blueshirts swept the Victoria Capitals in three games to win the Stanley Cup.
- The first Mass was celebrated in the new St. Paul Cathedral in Yakima, Washington.
- Born: Jiang Qing, Chinese politician, wife of Mao Zedong, Cultural Revolution leader; as Li Shumeng or Li Jinhai, in Zhucheng, Republic of China (present-day China) (d. 1991)
- Died: Giuseppe Mercalli, Italian geologist, developer of the Mercalli scale to measure earthquakes, accidentally burned to death (b. 1850)

== March 20, 1914 (Friday) ==
- Pancho Villa sent a force of 12,000 men to recapture Torreón, Coahuila, Mexico from 9,000 federal troops stationed in the city.
- Curragh incident – British Army officers stationed at the Curragh Camp resigned their commissions rather than be ordered to resist action by Unionist Ulster Volunteers if the Home Rule Bill was passed. The government backed down and they were reinstated.
- Over 9,000 French citizens attended the funeral of newspaper editor Gaston Calmette in Paris. The editor of the Le Figaro was assassinated on March 16.
- The first U.S. Figure Skating Championships were held in New Haven, Connecticut. The second championship would not be held until 1918 due to World War I.
- The film adaptation of the Grace Miller White novel Tess of the Storm Country was released, with Mary Pickford in the starring role and directed by Edwin S. Porter. The film was preserved by the Library of Congress.
- Born: Tom Derrick, Australian soldier, recipient of the Victoria Cross for action during the Battle of Tarakan; as Thomas Derrick, in Medindie, South Australia, Australia (d. 1945)
- Died: Marie Jansen, American musical theater actress, best known for lead roles in comic operas such as Iolanthe and Erminie (b. 1857)

== March 21, 1914 (Saturday) ==
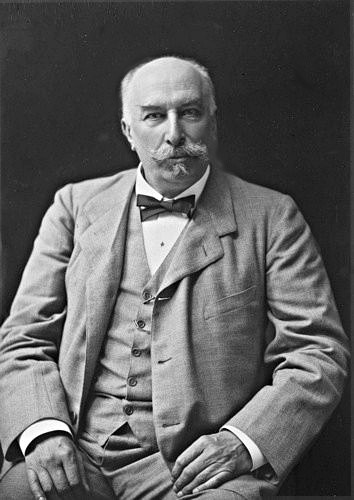
Giovanni Giolitti, Prime Minister of Italy

- Outgoing Italian Prime Minister Giovanni Giolitti dissolved his fourth cabinet, and was replaced by the first cabinet of incoming Prime Minister Antonio Salandra.
- The commission set up by Venustiano Carranza confirmed British rancher William S. Benton had been stabbed to death in Pancho Villa's office by fellow officer Major Rudolfo Fierro. The commission claimed Villa concocted the story of the court martial against Benton to protect Fierro, a distant relative to the rebel leader.
- The Methodist Episcopal Church in Nashville, Tennessee began work to build a seminary school after severing ties with Vanderbilt University, leading to the establishment of the Candler School of Theology in Atlanta in the fall.
- The English College Johore Bahru, one of the ten oldest English schools in Malaysia, opened its doors with 21 students (all boys) under the tutelage of two teachers from England. As of its centennial, the school serves over 1200 students.
- Boxer Tom McCormick lost the welterweight title to Matt Wells after more than 20 rounds in Sydney.
- U.S. Figure Skating Championships — Figure skater Theresa Weld won gold in women's competition while Norman M. Scott captured gold in the men's competition.
- The opera Béatrice by French composer André Messager debuted at Théâtre du Casino now the Opéra de Monte-Carlo in Monaco.
- Born:
  - Hernán Siles Zuazo, Bolivian state leader, 46th President of Bolivia; in La Paz, Bolivia (d. 1996)
  - Paul Tortelier, French musician and composer, cellist for the Monte-Carlo Philharmonic Orchestra, and Boston Symphony Orchestra; in Paris, France (d. 1980)
  - Sakae Ōba, Japanese military officer, led Japanese guerrilla resistance in Saipan from 1944 to 1945; in Gamagōri, Empire of Japan (present-day Japan) (d. 1992)

== March 22, 1914 (Sunday) ==
- Argentina held legislative elections, with Radical Civic Union winning the majority of seats in the Argentine Chamber of Deputies and securing their road to government by 1916.
- En route to recapture Torreón, Pancho Villa attacked Gómez Palacio, Durango, Mexico. The four-day battle resulted in 1,000 killed and 3,000 wounded but emboldened Villa to continue marching on to Torreón.
- Belgian cyclist Marcel Buysse won the second Tour of Flanders in Ghent.
- Born: John Stanley, American cartoonist and comic book writer, creator of Little Lulu; in New York City, United States (d. 1993)

== March 23, 1914 (Monday) ==
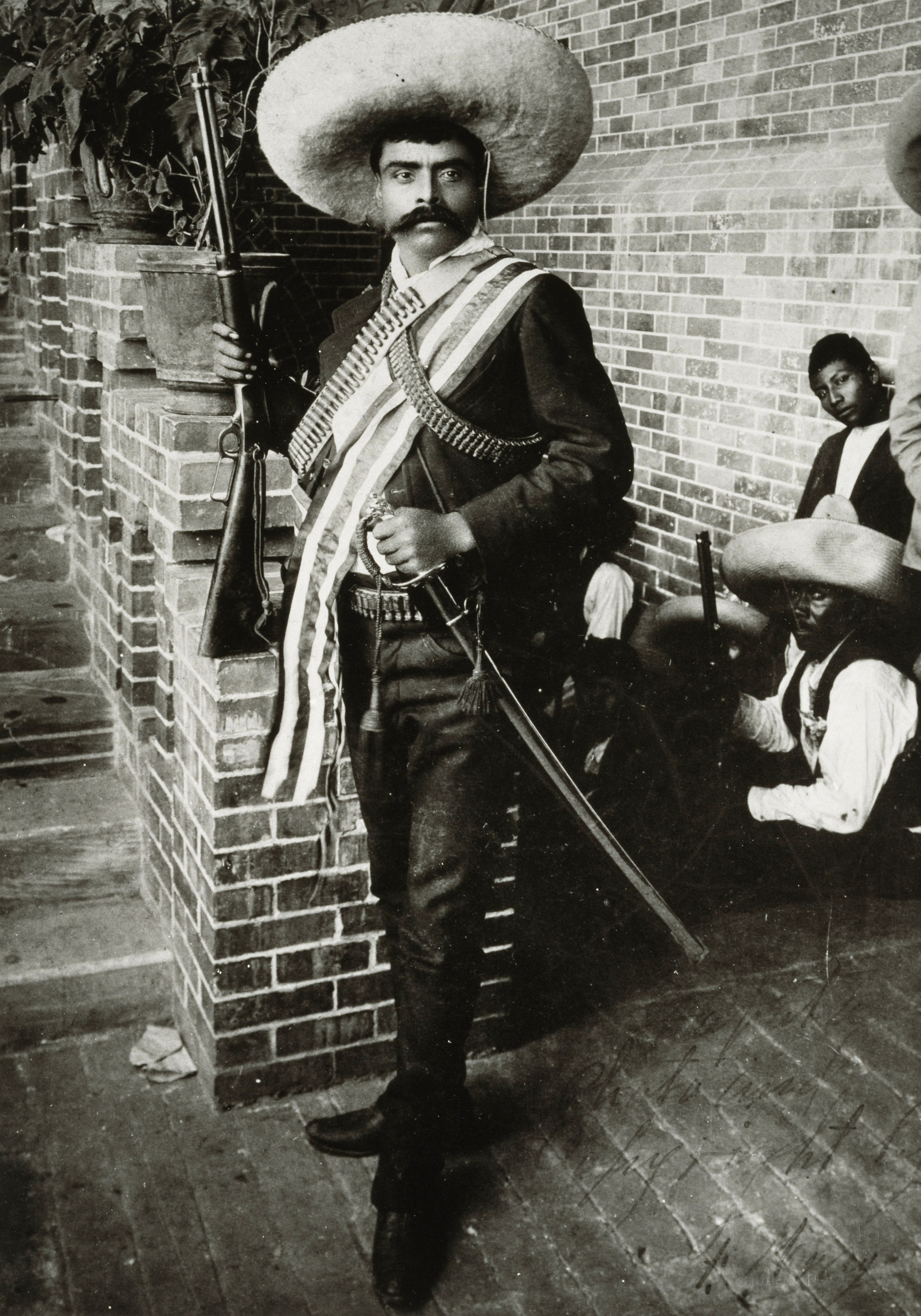
General Emiliano Zapata

- The city of Chilpancingo, Mexico fell to revolutionary forces under command of Jesús Salgado and Emiliano Zapata.
- The U.S. Navy battleship USS Oklahoma was launched by the New York Shipbuilding Corporation of Camden, New Jersey. The famed battleship gained prestige in protecting convoys in World War I. The ship was sunk during the Imperial Japanese Navy's attack on Pearl Harbor on December 7, 1941.
- The Baker Street train station opened in Fort Wayne, Indiana. It eventually closed in 1990.
- Born:
  - Carmen Planas, Filipino politician, first woman elected to public office in the Philippines, member of the Manila City Council from 1934 to 1940, 8th Vice Mayor of Manila; in Tondo, Manila, Philippine Islands (present-day Philippines) (d. 1964)
  - Norman Low, Scottish association football player, central defender for Liverpool, Newport, and Norwhich from 1933 to 1950; in Aberdeen, Scotland (d. 1994)
- Died: Rafqa Pietra Choboq Ar-Rayès, Lebanese nun, member of the Lebanese Maronite Order, canonized by Pope John Paul II in 2001 (b. 1832)

== March 24, 1914 (Tuesday) ==
- Admiral Count Yamamoto Gonnohyōe, the 8th Prime Minister of Japan, resigned from office along with his entire cabinet after both houses of National Diet (Japan legislature) refused to pass the budget for the Imperial Japanese Navy. The budget was plagued by the Siemens scandal, which resulted in many Japanese naval officers admitting to taking bribes for naval contracts offered by foreign companies Siemens and Vickers.
- Ekebergbanen was formed to build and operate the Ekeberg light rail line in Oslo, Norway. Construction of the line started immediately, but delivery of technical equipment and rolling stock was delayed due to World War I.
- Blanche Sweet and Henry B. Walthall re-teamed with director D. W. Griffith for The Avenging Conscience, loosely based on the Edgar Allan Poe short story "The Tell-Tale Heart".

== March 25, 1914 (Wednesday) ==
- The Tokushima railroad was extended in the Tokushima Prefecture, Japan, with new stations Kawata, Anabuki, Oshima, Sadamitsu, Awa-Handa, Eguchi, Awa-Kamo, and Tsuji opened to serve the line.
- Sports club Aris Thessaloniki was established in Thessaloniki, Greece, with the club names after the Greek god of war. Along with the Aris football program, the club also offers basketball, volleyball, water polo, hockey, swimming, boxing, and athletics.
- Born: Norman Borlaug, American agricultural scientist, referred to as the "father of the Green Revolution," recipient of the Nobel Peace Prize in 1970; in Cresco, Iowa, United States (d. 2009)
- Died: Frédéric Mistral, French writer, recipient of the Nobel Prize in Literature, best known for the long poem Mirèio (b. 1830)

== March 26, 1914 (Thursday) ==
- Pancho Villa's forces reached Torreón and attacked 12,000 federal troops occupying the city. Vicious fighting over the next six days yielded heavy losses on both sides, but Villa was able to recapture the city he had previously conquered in September, 1913.
- A Farman MF.7 military plane was the first aircraft to use Værnes Air Station in Norway. The military air base was eventually expanded to civilian air traffic and became Trondheim Airport.
- Born:
  - William Westmoreland, American army officer, commanded American military operations in the Vietnam War from 1964 to 1968, in Saxon, South Carolina (d. 2005)
  - Ian McGeoch, British naval officer, commander of the submarine HMS Splendid; in Helensburgh, Scotland (d. 2007)

== March 27, 1914 (Friday) ==
- Sweden held an early general election, following the premature dissolving of the Swedish Parliament by the cabinet of Hjalmar Hammarskjöld.
- In Brussels, surgeon Albert Hustin made the first successful non-direct blood transfusion using anticoagulant.
- The Royal Thai Air Force opened an air base near Bangkok. It expanded to commercial aircraft in 1924 and became Don Mueang International Airport.
- Jockey Bill Smith, riding horse Sunloch, won the 76th renewal of the Grand National at Aintree near Liverpool, England.
- Born:
  - Budd Schulberg, American screenwriter, television producer, novelist and sports writer, recipient of the Academy Award for Best Original Screenplay for On the Waterfront; as Seymour Wilson Schulberg, in New York City, United States (d. 2009)
  - Ces Burke, New Zealand cricketer, batman for Auckland and the New Zealand national cricket team from 1937 to 1954; as Cecil Burke, in Ellerslie, New Zealand (d. 1997)

== March 28, 1914 (Saturday) ==
- The Cambridge University Boat Club won the 71st Oxford and Cambridge Boat Race.
- Runner Alfred Nichols won gold at the International Cross Country Championships, held in Amersham, England. Team England also captured gold in the competition, which included 45 athletes from five countries.
- Born:
  - Edmund Muskie, American politician, 58th United States Secretary of State; in Rumford, Maine, United States (d. 1996)
  - Bohumil Hrabal, Czech poet and novelist, known for works such as Dancing Lessons for the Advanced in Age; in Židenice, Austria-Hungary (present-day Brno, Czech Republic) (d. 1997)
  - Sesenne, St. Lucian singer, leading performance artist through Radio St. Lucia, recipient of the British Empire Medal and Order of the British Empire; as Marie Selipha Charlery, in Micoud Quarter, Saint Lucia (d. 2010)
- Died: Randolph McCoy, American patriarch, head of the McCoy clan of the infamous Hatfield–McCoy feud (b. 1825)

== March 29, 1914 (Sunday) ==
- Katherine and William Scoresby Routledge arrived on Easter Island on the ship Mana for a one-year archaeological expedition of the remote island and its famous Moai (giant statues).
- The Milano Greco Pirelli railway station opened on the Milan–Monza railway in Milan.
- Born: Chapman Pincher, British journalist and author, best known for exposés on British espionage; as Henry Chapman Pincher, in Ambala, British Raj (present-day India) (d. 2014)

== March 30, 1914 (Monday) ==
- Civil War broke out in the Dominican Republic, forcing the United States to intervene.
- The sealing ship SS Newfoundland was entrapped in ice during the annual seal hunt off the coast of Newfoundland and Labrador. Its sister ship SS Stephano was nearby, giving Captain Wes Kean of SS Newfoundland a false sense of security. Kean ordered much of his crew out on the ice to hunt seals and stay overnight on the SS Stephano. Miscommunication between both ships resulted in 132 crew members becoming lost on the ice between ships in worsening weather.
- A World Flyweight Championship (108 lb to 112 lb) was proposed for the first time after Jimmy Wilde defeated Eugene Husson in London. Wilde, subsequently ranked by most experts as the greatest-ever flyweight, held the title until 1923.
- Born: Sonny Boy Williamson, American musician, singer and songwriter, pioneer of the blues harmonica; as John Lee Curtis Williamson, in Madison County, Tennessee, United States (d. 1948)
- Died: John Henry Poynting, English physicist, discovered the Poynting–Robertson effect and developed the Poynting vector (b. 1852)

== March 31, 1914 (Tuesday) ==
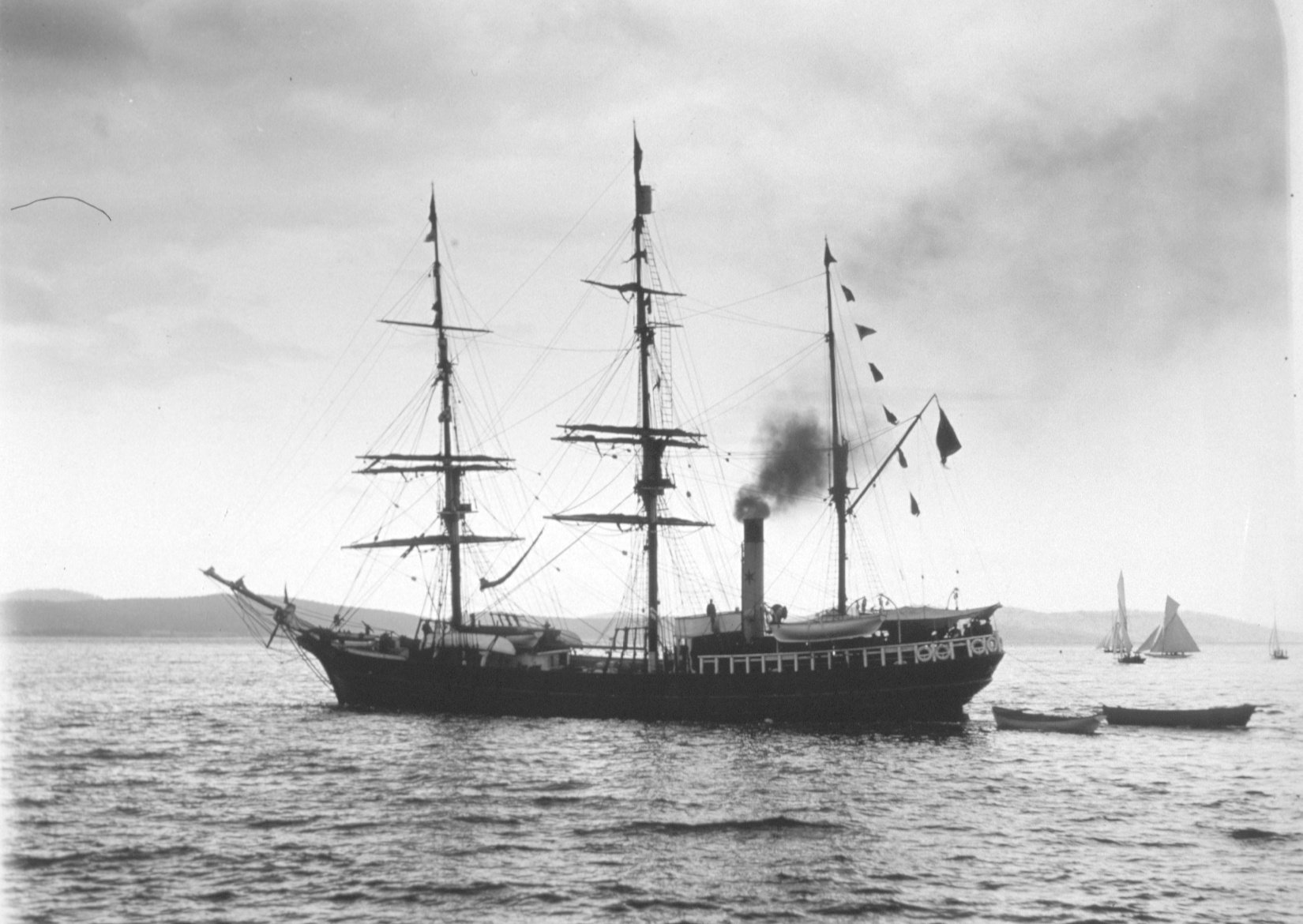
SS Southern Cross

- Third Battle of Topolobampo — Mexican rebel gunship Tampico attacked Mexican naval gunship Guerrero as it attempted to break out of naval blockage set up around the bay of Topolobampo. In the ensuing battle, Tampico hit Guerrero three times, wounding three of the ship's crew. Tampico was struck four to six times but was able to retreat back into the harbor and run aground.
- The sealing vessel SS Southern Cross was spotted for the last time by SS Portia off the Avalon Peninsula, Newfoundland before disappearing and believed sunk with all 173 crew on board.
- The Portuguese Football Federation was formed in Lisbon.
- The second episode of the serial The Perils of Pauline, starring Pearl White, was released.
- The borough of Ogdensburg, New Jersey was incorporated.
- Born: Octavio Paz, Mexican writer and diplomat, recipient of the Nobel Prize in Literature, known for his book The Labyrinth of Solitude; as Octavio Paz Lozano, in Mexico City, Mexico (d. 1998)
- Died:
  - Timothy Daniel Sullivan, Irish journalist, politician and poet, wrote the Irish national hymn God Save Ireland (b. 1827)
  - Christian Morgenstern, German author and poet, best known for his poetry collection Gallows Songs (b. 1871)
  - Hubert von Herkomer, British painter and composer, best known for paintings such as Hard Times (b. 1849)
