= SS Pengreep =

1914 British cargo ship

History
- Name: Pengreep (1914–40); Ste Jacqueline (1940–43); Pengreep (1943); Empire Fal (1943–45)
- Owner: R B Chellew Steam Navigation Company (1914); Admiralty (1914–20); R B Chellew Steam Navigation Company (1920–40); Vichy French Government (1940–42); R B Chellew Steam Navigation Company (1942–43); Ministry of War Transport (1943–45)
- Operator: R B Chellew Steam Navigation Company (1914); Admiralty (1914–20); R B Chellew Steam Navigation Company (1920–40); Vichy French Government (1940–42); R B Chellew Steam Navigation Company (1942–45)
- Port of registry: (United Kingdom of Great Britain and Ireland) Falmouth, United Kingdom (1914–23); (United Kingdom) Falmouth (1923–40); Vichy France (1940–42); (United Kingdom) Falmouth (1942–45)
- Builder: Irvine's Shipbuilding and Drydock Co Ltd
- Launched: 8 April 1914
- Completed: May 1914
- Out of service: 2 July 1945
- Identification: United Kingdom Official Number 133349 (1914–40, 1942–45); Code Letters JFNQ (1914–34); Code Letters GQPT (1934–40, 1942–45)
- Fate: Scuttled

General characteristics
- Type: Cargo ship
- Tonnage: 4,806 GRT; 3,007 NRT
- Length: 390 ft 0 in (118.87 m)
- Beam: 52 ft 0 in (15.85 m)
- Draught: 24 ft 3 in (7.39 m)
- Depth: 26 ft 9 in (8.15 m)
- Installed power: 402 nhp
- Propulsion: Triple expansion steam engine, single screw propeller
- Speed: 8.5 knots (15.7 km/h)
- Armament: 1 × 4-inch gun (Pengreep, 1940); 1 × 12-pounder gun, 2 x Bofors guns, 3 x machine guns (Empire Fal, 1943); 1 × 3-inch or 12-pounder gun, 5 x machine guns (Empire Fal, 1944)

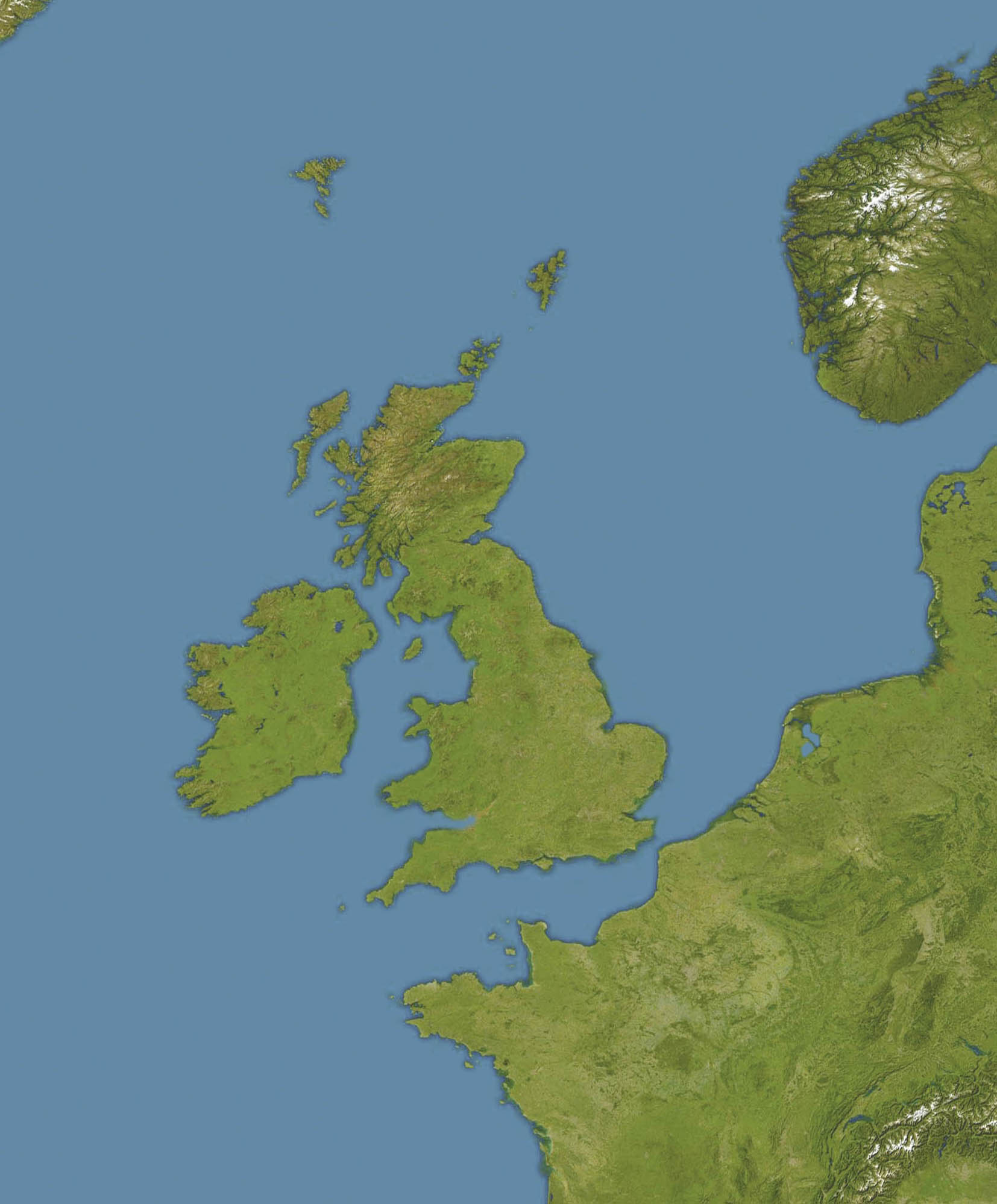
Location where Empire Fal was scuttled off Scotland.

Pengreep was a 8,806 GRT cargo ship that was built in 1914 by Irvine's Shipbuilding and Drydock Co Ltd, West Hartlepool, Co Durham, United Kingdom for a British company. She was requisitioned by the Admiralty on completion and returned to her owners in 1920. She was seized in June 1940 by Vichy French forces and renamed Ste Jacqueline. In 1942, she was seized by British forces, being renamed Pengreep in 1943. She was passed to the Ministry of War Transport (MoWT) later that year and renamed Empire Fal. In July 1945, she was scuttled with a cargo of gas bombs.

== Description ==
The ship was built in 1914 by Irvine's Shipbuilding and Drydock Co Ltd, West Hartlepool, Co Durham.

The ship was 390 feet 0 inches (118.87 m) long, with a beam of 52 feet 0 inches (15.85 m). She had a depth of 26 feet 9 inches (8.15 m) and a draught of 24 feet 8 inches (7.52 m). She was assessed at 4,806 GRT, 3,007 NRT,

The ship was propelled by a 402 nhp triple expansion steam engine, which had cylinders of 25½ inches (65 cm), 42 inches (110 cm) and 70 inches (180 cm) diameter by 48 inches (120 cm) stroke. The engine was built by Richardsons, Westgarth & Co Ltd, West Hartlepool and drove a single screw propeller. It could propel the ship at a speed of 8.5 knots (15.7 km/h).

== History ==
Pengreep was launched 8 April 1914, with completion in May and trials on 19 May. Built for R B Chellew Steam Navigation Company, she was requisitioned by the Admiralty in 1914, not returning to Chellew until 1920. Her port of registry was Falmouth, Cornwall. The United Kingdom Official Number 133349 and Code Letters JFNQ were allocated. On 10 March 1929, Pengreep was in collision with flotsam 7 nautical miles (13 km) north north west of the Newarp Lightship. She issued a call for assistance a 05:55, which was cancelled at 07:12. On 14 July 1930, Pengreep ran aground at Rosario, Argentina, whilst on a voyage from Buenos Aires to Dakar, Senegal. She was refloated on 18 July. With the changes to Code Letters in 1934, Pengreep was allocated the letters GQPT.

Little is known of Pengreep's service during World War II. She departed from Southend, Essex, United Kingdom on 31 October 1939 as a member of Convoy OA 28G, which formed Convoy OG 5 at sea on 3 November. Her destination was Cardiff, Glamorgan, where she arrived on 3 November. She is next recorded in Convoy OG 24F, which formed at sea on 29 March 1940 and arrived at Gibraltar on 3 April. Pengreep returned to the United Kingdom with Convoy HG 28, which sailed on 29 April and arrived at Liverpool, Lancashire on 9 May. She was carrying a cargo of ore bound for Middlesbrough, Yorkshire. Her armament consisted a 4-inch gun.

From Middlesbrough, Pengreep sailed to Sunderland, Co Durham, from where she joined Convoy FS 180, which departed from the Tyne on 26 May and arrived at Southend on 28 May. She was a member of Convoy OA 158GF, which departed on 30 May and formed Convoy OG 32F at sea on 2 June. OG 32F arrived at Gibraltar on 7 June. Pengreep was carrying a cargo of coal. She then sailed to Casablanca, Morocco, arriving on 9 June. On 25 June, Pengreep was seized by Vichy French forces. She was renamed Ste Jacqueline. In November 1942, she was seized by the British. At the time she was in a damaged and unseaworthy state. In 1943, Ste Jacqueline was renamed Pengreep. She returned to the United Kingdom as a member of Convoy XK 3, which departed from Gibraltar on 16 March and arrived at Liverpool on 28 March. She was carrying a cargo of iron ore and was due for repairs on arrival in the United Kingdom. Following repairs, she was passed to the MoWT and renamed Empire Fal. She regained her previous Official Number and Code Letters, again being registered at Falmouth. She was placed under the management of her former owners.

Empire Fal departed from Newport, Monmouthshire on 15 June 1943 for Milford Haven, Pembrokeshire, arriving the next day. She sailed that day to join Convoy OS50KM, which had departed from Liverpool and separated at sea on 27 June, forming convoys OS 50 and KMS 17. OS 50 arrived at Freetown, Sierra Leone on 8 July. Empire Fal was in the part of the convoy that formed KMS 17 and arrived at Gibraltar on 29 June. She was carrying a cargo of coal. Her armament consisted a 12-pounder gun, two Bofors guns and three machine guns. On 20 July, she sailed to Almería, Spain, returning to Gibraltar on 24 July. Empire Fal was a member of Convoy MKS 20, which departed on 31 July and arrived at Liverpool on 10 August. She was carrying a cargo of iron ore bound for Barrow in Furness, Lancashire, where she arrived on 13 August.

Empire Fal sailed on 26 August for Cardiff, arriving the next day. On 4 September, she sailed for Milford Haven, arriving later that day and departing on 5 September to join Convoy KMS 26G. That convoy had departed from Liverpool and arrived at Gibraltar on 18 September. She then joined Convoy KMS 26, which departed that day and arrived at Port Said, Egypt on 29 September. She arrived at Malta on 24 September. Empire Fal sailed on 23 October to join Convoy GUS 19, which had departed from Alexandria, Egypt on 19 October and arrived at the Hampton Roads, Virginia, United States on 15 November. She left the convoy at Casablanca, on 29 October. She sailed on 3 November to join Convoy MKS29G which departed from Gibraltar that day and arrived at Liverpool on 18 November. She sailed on to Loch Ewe, arriving on 18 November. Empire Fal joined Convoy WN 507, which departed on 19 November and arrived at Methil, Fife on 21 November. She departed on 21 November with Convoy FS 1279, which arrived at Southend on 23 November. Her destination was Immingham, Lincolnshire, where she arrived on 23 November.

Empire Fal sailed on 10 December to join Convoy FN 1201, which had departed from Southend earlier that day and arrived at Methil on 12 December. She then joined Convoy EN 318A, which arrived at Loch Ewe on 14 December and sailed on to Oban, Argyllshire, arriving the next day. She departed on 16 December to join Convoy OS 62KM, which had departed from Liverpool the previous day and split at sea on 2 January 1944 to form convoys OS 62 and KMS 36. OS 62 arrived at Freetown on 11 January. Empire Fal was in the portion that formed KMS 36 and arrived at Gibraltar on 3 January. Her destination was Lisbon, Portugal, where she arrived on 3 January. She sailed on 17 January for Gibraltar, arriving two days later. Empire Fal then made a return trip to Melilla, Spain, arriving back at Gibraltar on 22 January. She was a member of Convoy MKS38G, which departed on 1 February and rendezvoused at sea with Convoy SL 147 the next day. The combined convoys arrived at Liverpool on 13 February. Empire Fal sailed on to Loch Ewe, from where she joined Convoy WN 545 to Methil and then Convoy FS 1365 to Southend, arriving on 19 February.

Empire Fal was a member of Convoy FN 1278, which departed on 25 February and arrived at Methil on 27 February. She left the convoy at Hull, Yorkshire on 26 February. She sailed on 10 March to join Convoy FN 1292, which had departed from Southend earlier that day and arrived at Methil on 12 March. She sailed the next day with Convoy EN 358, which was destined for Loch Ewe. Empire Fal sailed on to Oban, arriving on 15 March. She departed on 24 March to join Convoy OS 72KM, which had departed from Liverpool the previous day and split at sea on 5 April to form convoys OS 72 and KMS 46. OS 72 arrived at Freetown on 14 April. Empire Fal was in the portion of the convoy that formed KMS 46G and arrived at Gibraltar on 6 April. She was carrying a cargo of coal. Her armament consisted a 3-inch or a 12-pounder gun and five machine guns. She joined Convoy KMS 46, which departed that day and arrived at Port Said on 16 April. Her destination was Bône, Algeria, where she arrived on 9 April. Empire Fal departed on 22 April to join Convoy GUS 37, which had departed from Port Said on 14 April and arrived at the Hampton Roads on 11 May. She left the convoy at Gibraltar, where she arrived on 25 April. She departed three days later to make a round trip to Melilla, arriving back at Gibraltar on 2 May. She was a member of Convoy MKS 48G, which departed on 10 May and rendezvoused at sea with Convoy SL 157 the next day. Empire Fal was carrying a cargo of iron ore and three passengers. The combined convoys arrived at Liverpool on 22 May. She left the convoy at Loch Ewe, arriving that day. She then joined Convoy WN 586 to Methil before departing on 25 May as a member of Convoy FS 1463, which arrived at Southend on 27 May. Empire Fal left the convoy at Sunderland on 26 May.

Empire Fal departed on 16 June for Hull, arriving the next day. She sailed on 28 June to join Convoy FN1402, which had departed from Southend and arrived at Methil on 30 June. She then joined Convoy EN 404, which departed on 3 July and arrived at Loch Ewe on 5 July. Empire Fal was a member of Convoy OS83KM, which departed from Liverpool on 12 July 1944 and split at sea on 23 July to form convoys OS 83 and KMS 57. OS 83 arrived at Freetown on 3 August whilst KMS 57 arrived at Gibraltar on 25 July. She was carrying coal bound for Bizerta, Algeria, but she collided with Tweedbank and returned, arriving at Rothesay, Buteshire on 14 July. She then sailed to the Clyde, from where she departed on 29 July for Liverpool, arriving on 2 August. Empire Fal was a member of Convoy OS90KM, which departed on 24 September and split at sea on 1 October to form convoys OS 90 and KMS 64. OS 90 arrived at Freetown on 11 October. Empire Fal was in the portion of the convoy that formed KMS 64 and arrived at Gibraltar on 2 October. She continued past Gibraltar. Her next recorded movement is an arrival at Marseille, France on 14 November. She sailed five days later for Toulon, arriving that day. She departed on 29 November for Algiers, where she arrived on 1 December, sailing that day for Oran, arriving the next day. Empire Fal then sailed to Benisaf, from where she departed on 10 December for Gibraltar, arriving the next day. She was a member of Convoy MKS 70G, which departed on 11 December and arrived at Liverpool on 19 December. Empire Fal was carrying a cargo of iron ore. She sailed on to The Downs, off the coast of Kent, arriving on 21 December and then sailing to Southend. She joined Convoy FN 1580, which departed on 23 December and arrived at Methil on 25 December. Her destination was Middlesbrough, where she arrived on 24 December.

Empire Fal departed on 21 January 1945 to join Convoy FN 1608, which had departed from Southend the previous day and arrived at Methil on 22 January. She then joined Convoy EN 471, which departed on 23 January and arrived at Loch Ewe two days later. She sailed on to the Belfast Lough, arriving on 26 January. On 30 January, Empire Fal joined Convoy ONS 41, which had departed from Liverpool the previous day and arrived at Halifax, Nova Scotia, Canada on 20 February. Laden with a cargo of woodpulp, she returned with Convoy SC 170, which departed on 17 March and arrived at Liverpool on 31 March. She left the convoy at the Clyde on 30 March.

Empire Fal sailed on 21 May for Hull, arriving on 29 May. She departed on 20 June for Immingham, arriving later that day. Her final voyage began on 29 June. On 2 July 1945, Empire Fal was scuttled north west of Scotland with a cargo of Italian gas bombs that were deemed too dangerous to discharge. The location was 58°00′09″N 11°00′00″W and she sank in 6,600 feet (2,000 m) of water.
