= Jesús Salgado =

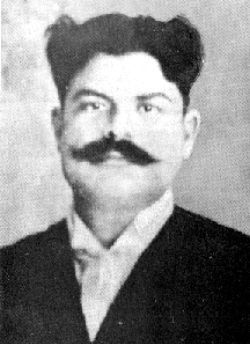
- Born: February 5, 1873; Teloloapan, Guerrero, Mexico
- Died: February 14, 1920 (aged 47) Tecpan de Galeana, Guerrero, Mexico
- Allegiance: Independent guerrilla chief, Liberation Army of the South
- Service years: 1910–1920
- Rank: Brigadier General
- Conflicts: Mexican Revolution

Jesús Salgado (February 5, 1873 – February 14, 1920) was a revolutionary leader and soldier in the Mexican Revolution, sometimes called the "Guerrero Zapata". He initially supported Francisco Madero but in 1911 threw his support behind Emiliano Zapata and remained loyal to the Zapatista cause until his death in 1919.

== Early life ==
Salgado was born to Ponciano Salgado and Maria de Jesus Hernandez, a middle-class family, in the village of Los Sauces in the district of Teloloapan in Guerrero in 1873.

== With Madero ==
In March 1911, in Apaxtla, he joined the Maderista movement against the dictatorial rule of Porfirio Diaz. Initially Salgado only had 55 men with him but this soon grew to more than three hundred. With this group of his own guerrillas he took the town of Iguala for Madero, as well as Tetela del Rio and Arcelia in mid April, and then Tlalchapa, Ajuchitlán and San Miguel Totolapan by the end of the month.

In November 1911 the archaeologist and mineralogist William Niven passed through Guerrero and was stopped by Salgado's rebels. Learning of his presence, Salgado expressed an interest in meeting the famous explorer but by the time Salgado's courier reached Niven, he had gone too far down the Balsas river. Salgado however guaranteed Niven free passage through his territory. A later encounter between Niven and Salgadistas, while tense (the rebels "bought" the explorers' weapons) ended amicably with both parties exchanging cries of "Viva Salgado!".

== Independent chief in Guerrero ==
Initially, he remained more or less an independent guerrilla leader, although he generally supported and admired Zapata. Unsatisfied with Madero's actions as president, Salgado remained in the field in 1912 and led a 3,000 strong rebel army in the southern state of Oaxaca in an agrarian uprising. According to the account given to Niven, Salgado rose in revolt against Madero because Madero had appointed Ambrosio Figureoa, Salgado's enemy, as governor of Guerrero. Subsequently Figureoa had Salgado temporarily imprisoned in Mexico City and burned down his house in Iguala.

Both in Guerrero and Oaxaca Salgado recruited troops from the peasants by promising them rich landowners' land, which was to be divided amongst them after the revolution. As a result, many of his soldiers engaged in immediate seizures and generally were a lot more undisciplined than other Zapatista troops. According to Frank McLynn, the Selgado revolt often shaded from a political one into straight forward banditry.

== With Zapata ==
Salgado came under Zapata's direct orders when he signed on to the Plan of Ayala in 1913. In 1914, he joined the fight against the coup d'état of Victoriano Huerta. In early February 1914 he was charged by Zapata with planning the attack on the capital of Guerrero, Chilpancingo. He subsequently led 5,000 Zapatista troops in the successful taking of the capital. After the battle, he was made the provisional governor of Guerrero based on Article 13 of the Plan of Ayala. He took office in March, purged the local bureaucracy and minted Zapatista pesos with silver from Guerrero's mines, but then delegated most of the day-to-day operations of running Guerrero to his subordinates and continued as a military field general.

He moved his troops to the northern part of Guerrero, took Iguala again (this time for Zapata), Taxco and, Buenavista de Cuéllar. In 1915, together with Genovevo de la O, Salgado led an offensive against troops of Venustiano Carranza.

== Death ==
Salgado died February 14, 1920, in the Sierra Madre del Sur mountains, fighting the troops of Carranza.
