= Hokusei Chūō Kōenguchi Station =

Railway station in Yokkaichi, Mie prefecture, Japan

Hokusei Chūō Kōenguchi Station 北勢中央公園口駅
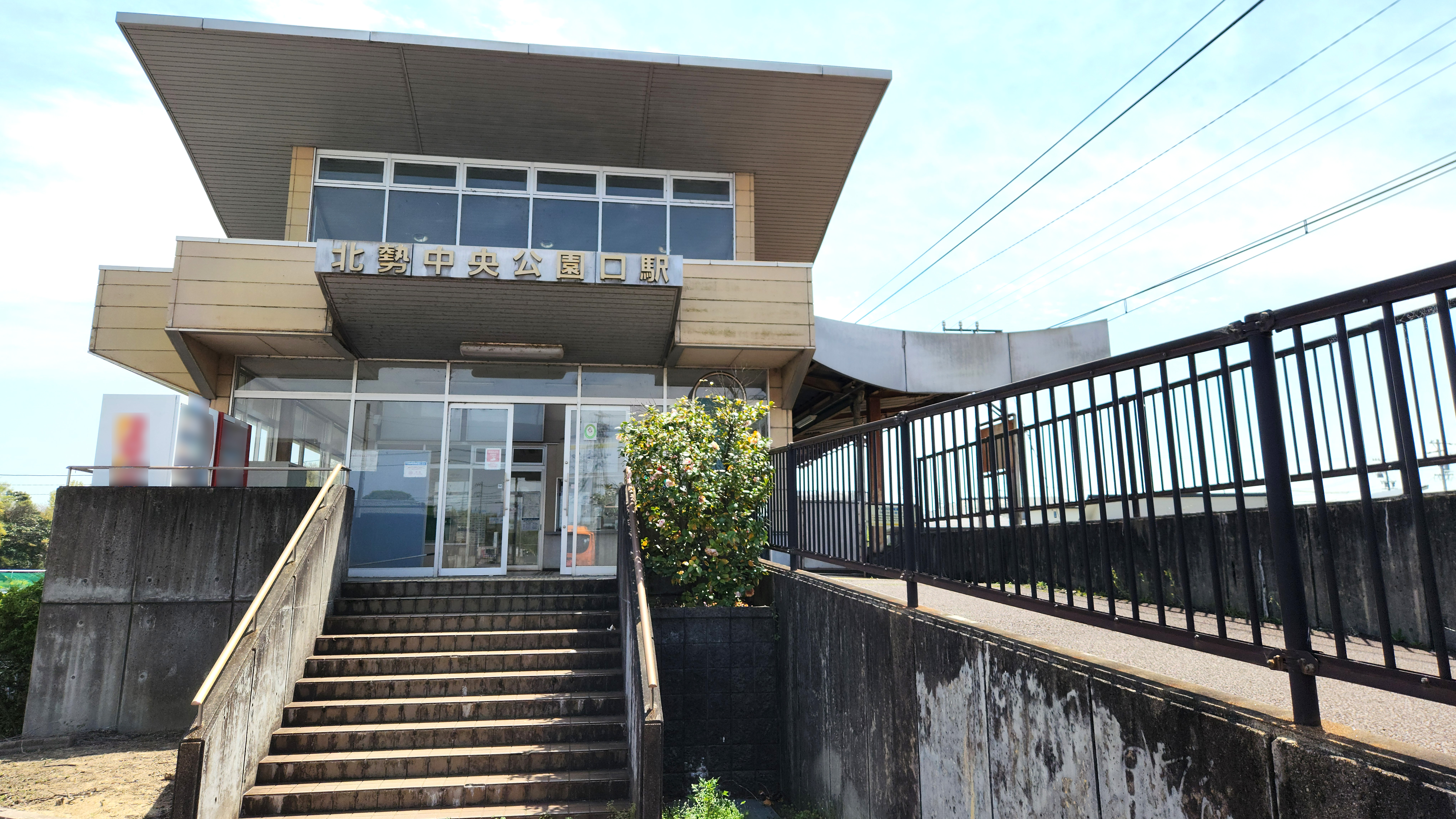
- Hokusei Chūō Kōenguchi Station in April 2025

General information
- Location: Ichiba-cho 536-2, Yokkaichi-shi, Mie-ken 512-1302; Japan
- Coordinates: 35°03′38.19″N 136°33′58.28″E
- Operator: Sangi Railway
- Line: Sangi Line
- Distance: 11.2 km from Kintetsu-Tomida
- Platforms: 1 side platform

History
- Opened: July 23, 1931
- Former names: Daichō (until 1997)

Passengers
- FY2019: 285 daily

Services
Preceding station	Sangi Railway	Following station
Hobo towards Kintetsu-Tomida	Sangi Line	Umedoi towards Nishi-Fujiwara
Location
- Location within Mie Prefecture Location within Japan

Hokusei Chūō Kōenguchi Station (北勢中央公園口駅, Hokusei Chūō Kōenguchi-eki) is a passenger railway station located in the city of Yokkaichi, Mie Prefecture, Japan, operated by the private railway operator Sangi Railway.

== Lines ==
Hokusei Chūō Kōenguchi Station is served by the Sangi Line, and is located 11.2 kilometres from the terminus of the line at Kintetsu-Tomida Station.

== Layout ==
The station consists of a single side platform serving bi-directional traffic.

=== Platforms ===
1	■ Sangi Line	For Kintetsu-Tomida; For Nishi-Fujiwara

== History ==
Hokusei Chūō Kōenguchi Station was opened on July 23, 1931 as Daichō Station (大長). It was renamed to its present name on April 1, 1997 when the station was reconstructed 100 meters in the direction of Tomida.

== Passenger statistics ==
In fiscal 2019, the station was used by an average of 285 passengers daily (boarding passengers only).

== Surrounding area ==
- Prefectural Hokusei Chuo Park (about 20 minutes on foot)
- Takamidai (residential area)

== See also ==
- List of railway stations in Japan
