= Heizu Station =

Railway station in Yokkaichi, Mie prefecture, Japan

Heizu Station 平津駅
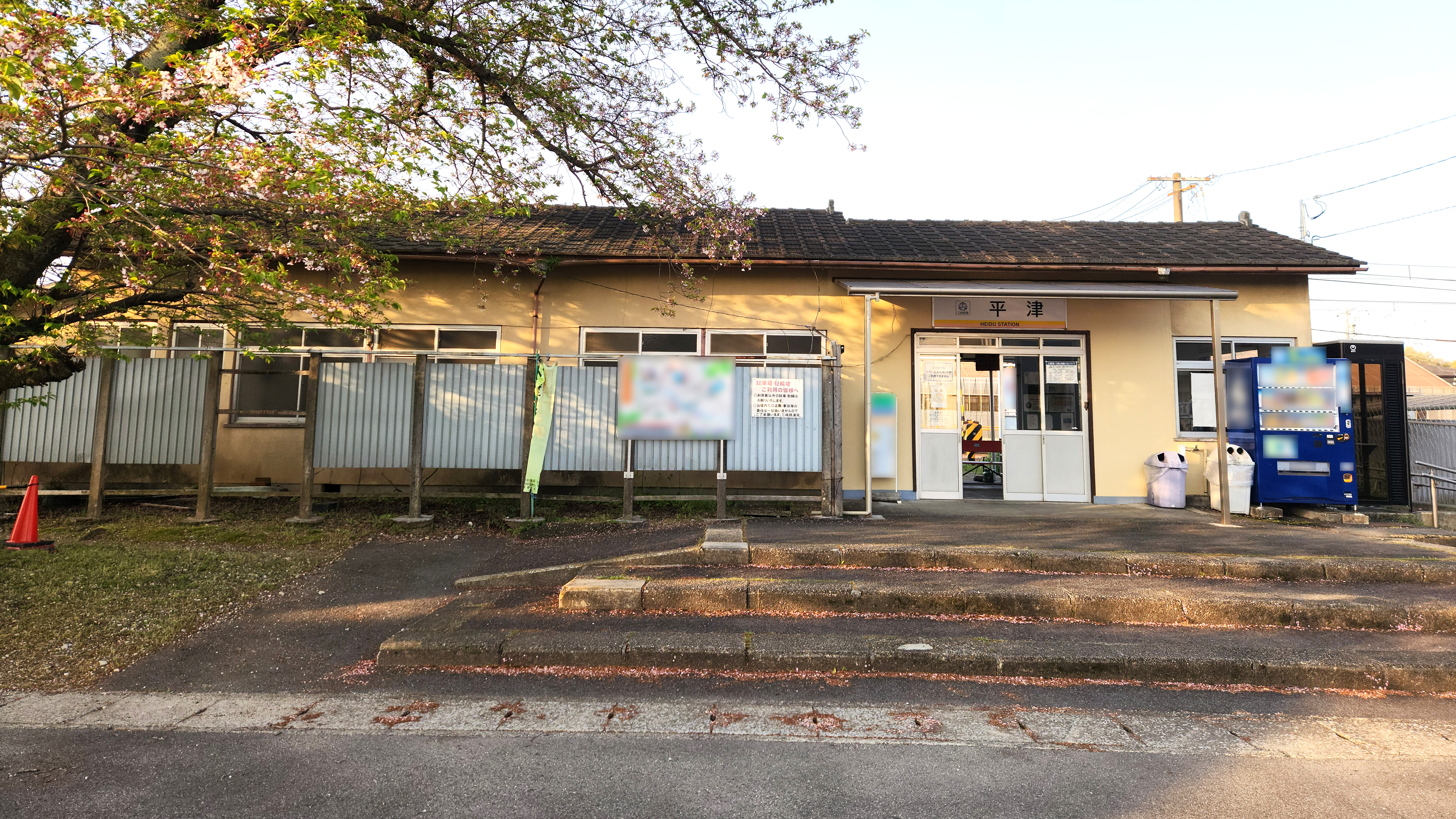
- The station building in April 2025

General information
- Location: Heizu-cho 385-2, Yokkaichi-shi, Mie-ken 512-8042; Japan
- Coordinates: 35°01′58.01″N 136°36′21.27″E
- Operator: Sangi Railway
- Line: Sangi Line
- Distance: 4.1 km from Kintetsu-Tomida
- Platforms: 1 island platform

History
- Opened: July 23, 1931

Passengers
- FY2019: 183 daily

Services
Preceding station	Sangi Railway	Following station
Ōyachi towards Kintetsu-Tomida	Sangi Line	Akatsuki Gakuenmae towards Nishi-Fujiwara
Location
- Location within Mie Prefecture Location within Japan

Heizu Station (平津駅, Heizu-eki) is a passenger railway station located in the city of Yokkaichi, Mie Prefecture, Japan, operated by the private railway operator Sangi Railway.

== Lines ==
Heizu Station is served by the Sangi Line, and is located 4.1 kilometres from the terminus of the line at Kintetsu-Tomida Station.

== Layout ==
The station consists of a single island platform connected to the station building by a level crossing.

=== Platforms ===
1	■ Sangi Line	For Kintetsu-Tomida
2	■ Sangi Line	For Nishi-Fujiwara

== History ==
Heizu Station was opened on July 23, 1931.

== Passenger statistics ==
In fiscal 2019, the station was used by an average of 183 passengers daily (boarding passengers only).

== Surrounding area ==
- Yokkaichi City Hall Hachigo District Citizen Center
- Yokkaichi City Asake Junior High School
- Yokkaichi Municipal Hachigo Elementary School
- Yokkaichi Municipal Hachigo Nishi Elementary School
- Yokkaichi University

== See also ==
- List of railway stations in Japan
