= Akatsuki Gakuenmae Station =

Railway station in Yokkaichi, Mie prefecture, Japan

Akatsuki Gakuenmae Station 暁学園前駅
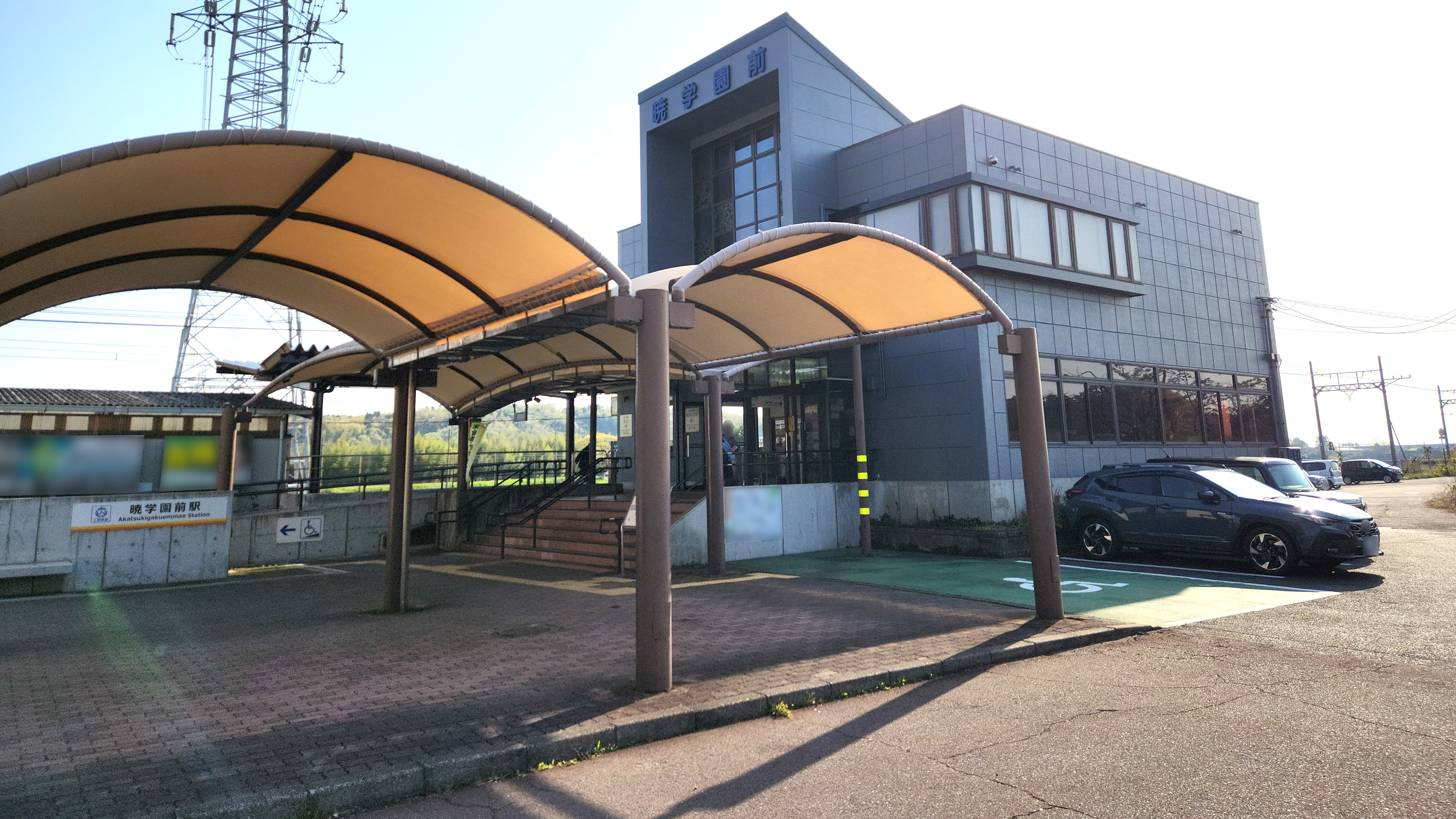
- The station building in April 2025

General information
- Location: Nakamura-cho 393-2, Yokkaichi-shi, Mie-ken 512-8044; Japan
- Coordinates: 35°01′58.01″N 136°36′21.27″E
- Operator: Sangi Railway
- Line: Sangi Line
- Distance: 5.3 km from Kintetsu-Tomida
- Platforms: 1 side platform

History
- Opened: July 23, 1931
- Former names: Kayo (until 1965)

Passengers
- FY2019: 1548 daily

Services
Preceding station	Sangi Railway	Following station
Heizu towards Kintetsu-Tomida	Sangi Line	Yamajo towards Nishi-Fujiwara
Location
- Location within Mie Prefecture Location within Japan

Akatsuki Gakuenmae Station (暁学園前駅, Akatsuki Gakuenmae-eki) is a passenger railway station located in the city of Yokkaichi, Mie Prefecture, Japan, operated by the private railway operator Sangi Railway.

== Lines ==
Akatsuki Gakuenmae Station is served by the Sangi Line, and is located 5.3 kilometres from the terminus of the line at Kintetsu-Tomida Station.

== Layout ==
The station consists of a single side platform serving bi-directional traffic

=== Platforms ===
1	■ Sangi Line	For Kintetsu-Tomida; For Nishi-Fujiwara

== History ==
Akatsuki Gakuenmae Station was opened on July 23, 1931, as Kayo Station (萱生駅; Kayo-eki). It was renamed to its present name on August 21, 1965, when the station building was rebuilt.

== Passenger statistics ==
In fiscal 2019, the station was used by an average of 1548 passengers daily (boarding passengers only).

== Surrounding area ==
- Akatsuki Junior High School / High School (Kayou Castle Ruins)
- Mie Prefectural Kuwana Nishi High School

== See also ==
- List of railway stations in Japan
