= Yamajō Station =

Railway station in Yokkaichi, Mie Prefecture, Japan

Yamajo Station 山城駅
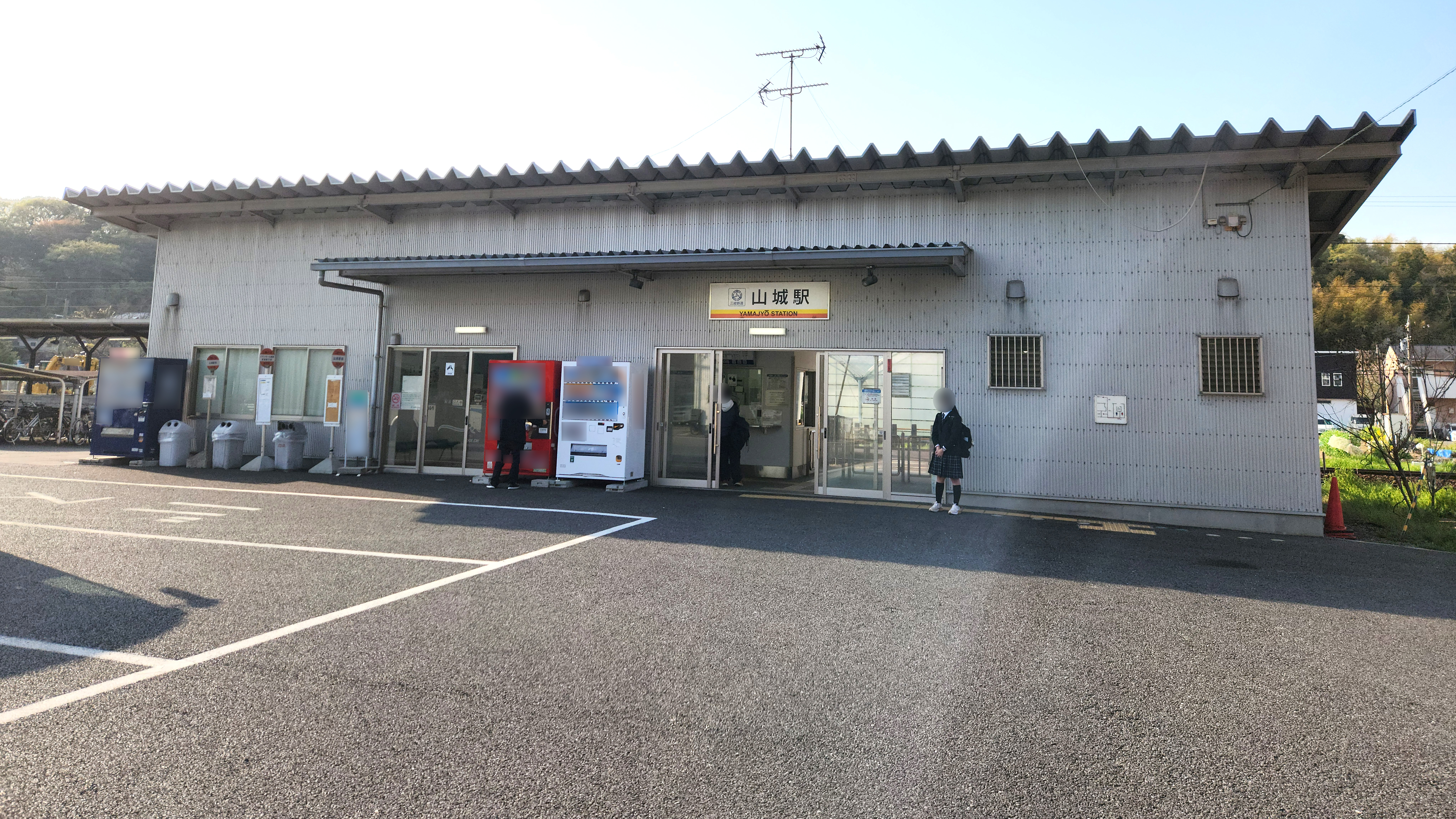
- The station building in April 2025

General information
- Location: Yamajo-cho 1106-2, Yokkaichi-shi, Mie-ken 512-8048; Japan
- Coordinates: 35°02′7.22″N 136°35′16.32″E
- Operator: Sangi Railway
- Line: Sangi Line
- Distance: 7.0 km from Kintetsu-Tomida
- Platforms: 1 island platform

History
- Opened: July 23, 1931

Passengers
- FY2019: 491 daily

Services
Preceding station	Sangi Railway	Following station
Akatsuki Gakuenmae towards Kintetsu-Tomida	Sangi Line	Hobo towards Nishi-Fujiwara
Location
- Location within Mie Prefecture Location within Japan

Yamajō Station (山城駅, Yamajō-eki) is a passenger railway station located in the city of Yokkaichi, Mie Prefecture, Japan, operated by the private railway operator Sangi Railway.

== Lines ==
Yamajo Station is served by the Sangi Line, and is located 7.0 kilometres from the terminus of the line at Kintetsu-Tomida Station.

== Layout ==
The station consists of a single island platform connected to the station building by a level crossing.

=== Platforms ===
1	■ Sangi Line	For Kintetsu-Tomida
2	■ Sangi Line	For Nishi-Fujiwara

== History ==
Yamajo Station was opened on July 23, 1931.

== Passenger statistics ==
In fiscal 2019, the station was used by an average of 491 passengers daily (boarding passengers only).

== Surrounding area ==
- Yokkaichi City Hall Shimono District Civic Center
- Yokkaichi Yamajo Post Office

== See also ==
- List of railway stations in Japan
