= Umedoi Station =

Railway station in Inabe, Mie Prefecture, Japan

Umedoi Station 梅戸井駅
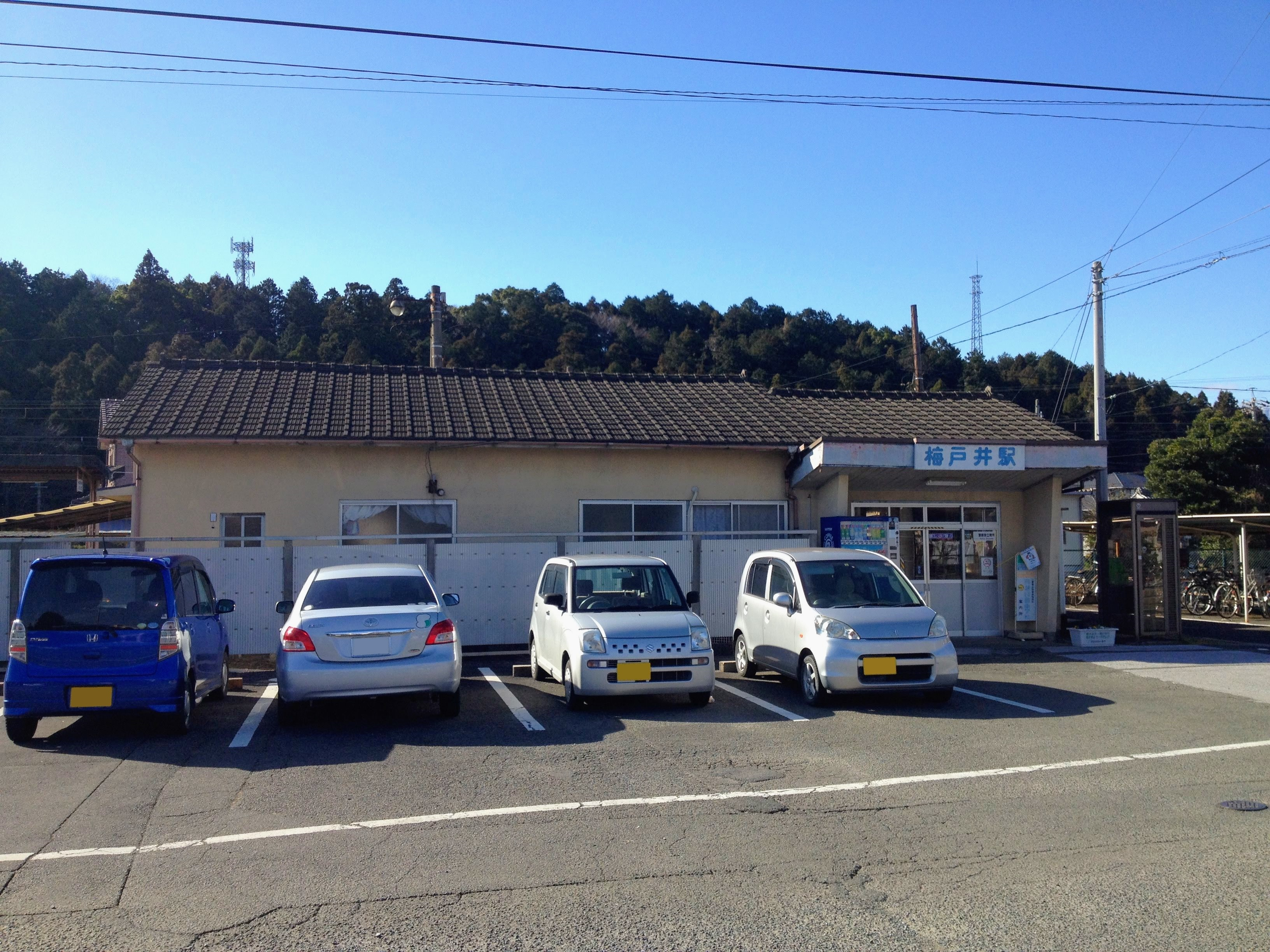
- Umedoi Station, January 2018

General information
- Location: Daian-cho Umedo 2354-2, Inabe-shi, Mie-ken 511-0284; Japan
- Coordinates: 35°04′31.02″N 136°33′25.3″E
- Operator: Sangi Railway
- Line: Sangi Line
- Distance: 13.1 km from Kintetsu-Tomida
- Platforms: 1 island platform

History
- Opened: July 23, 1931

Passengers
- FY2019: 135 daily

Services
| Preceding station | Sangi Railway | Following station |
|---|---|---|
| Hokusei Chūō Kōenguchi towards Kintetsu-Tomida | Sangi Line | Daian towards Nishi-Fujiwara |
Location
- Location within Mie Prefecture Location within Japan

Umedoi Station (梅戸井駅, Umedoi-eki) is a passenger railway station located in the city of Inabe, Mie Prefecture, Japan, operated by the private railway operator Sangi Railway.

== Lines ==
Umedoi Station is served by the Sangi Line, and is located 13.1 kilometres from the terminus of the line at Kintetsu-Tomida Station.

== Layout ==
The station consists of a single island platform connected to the station building by a level crossing.

=== Platforms ===
| 1 | ■ Sangi Line | For Kintetsu-Tomida |
| 2 | ■ Sangi Line | For Nishi-Fujiwara |

== History ==
Umedoi Station was opened on July 23, 1931.

== Passenger statistics ==
In fiscal 2019, the station was used by an average of 135 passengers daily (boarding passengers only).

== Surrounding area ==
- Umedoi Post Office

== See also ==
- List of railway stations in Japan
