= Higashi-Fujiwara Station =

Railway station in Inabe, Mie prefecture, Japan

Higashi-Fujiwara Station 東藤原駅
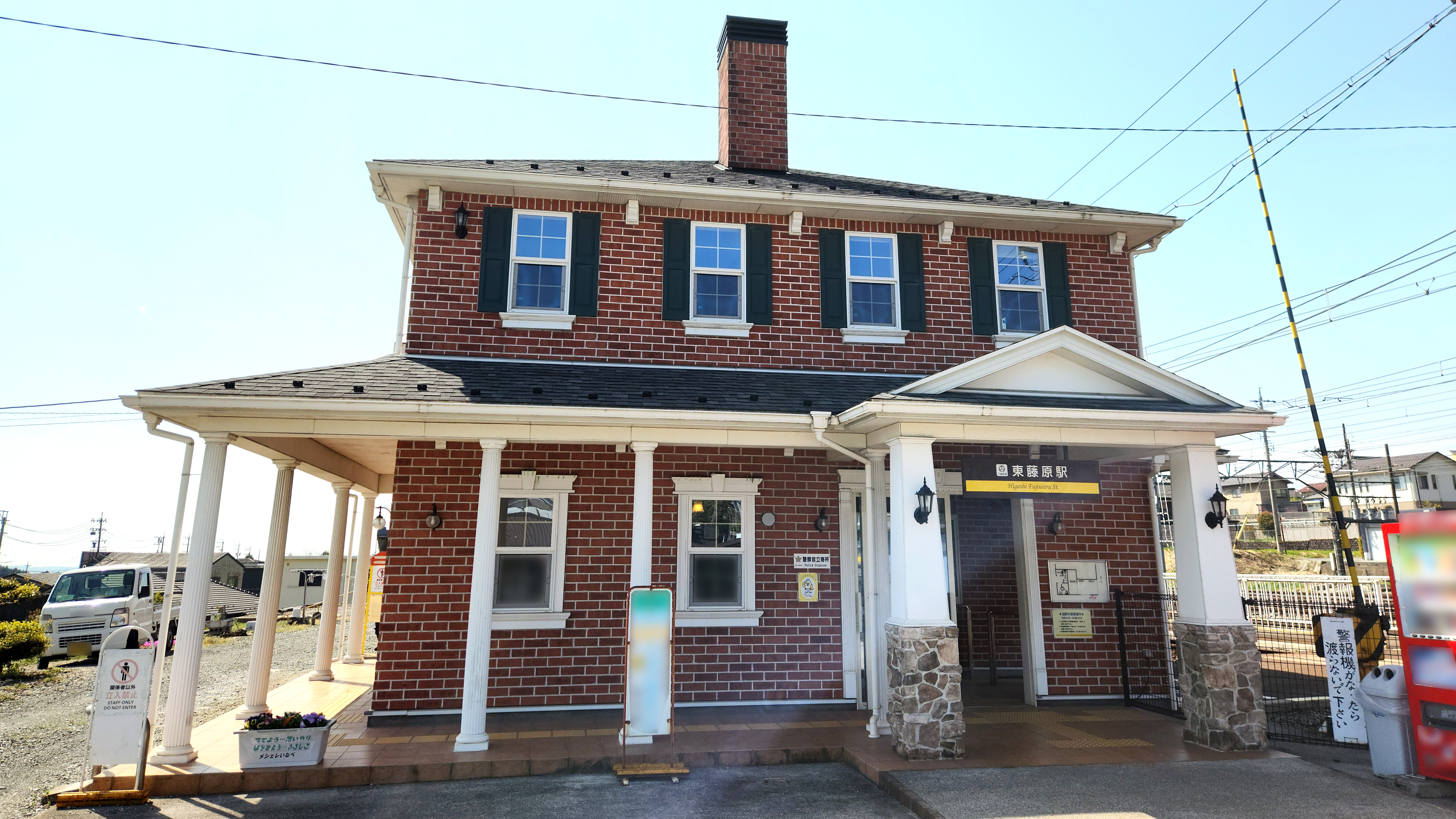
- The station building in April 2025

General information
- Location: Fujiwara-cho Tozenji 895, Inabe-shi, Mie-ken 511-0515; Japan
- Coordinates: 35°08′51.54″N 136°29′56.04″E
- Operator: Sangi Railway
- Line: Sangi Line
- Distance: 23.1 km from Kintetsu-Tomida
- Platforms: 1 island platform

History
- Opened: July 23, 1931

Passengers
- FY2019: 37 daily

Services
| Preceding station | Sangi Railway | Following station |
|---|---|---|
| Ise-Hatta towards Kintetsu-Tomida | Sangi Line | Nishi-Nojiri towards Nishi-Fujiwara |
Location
- Location within Mie Prefecture Location within Japan

Higashi-Fujiwara Station (東藤原駅, Higashi-Fujiwara-eki) is a passenger railway station located in the city of Inabe, Mie Prefecture, Japan, operated by the private railway operator Sangi Railway.

== Lines ==
Higashi-Fujiwara Station is a terminus by the Sangi Line, and is located 23.1 kilometres from the opposing terminus of the line at Kintetsu-Tomida Station.

== Layout ==
The station consists of a single island platform connected to thewooden station building by a level crossing. A Hoki Type 5700 Hopper car is on display outside the station.

=== Platforms ===
| 1 | ■ Sangi Line | For Kintetsu-Tomida |
| 2 | ■ Sangi Line | For Nishi-Fujiwara |

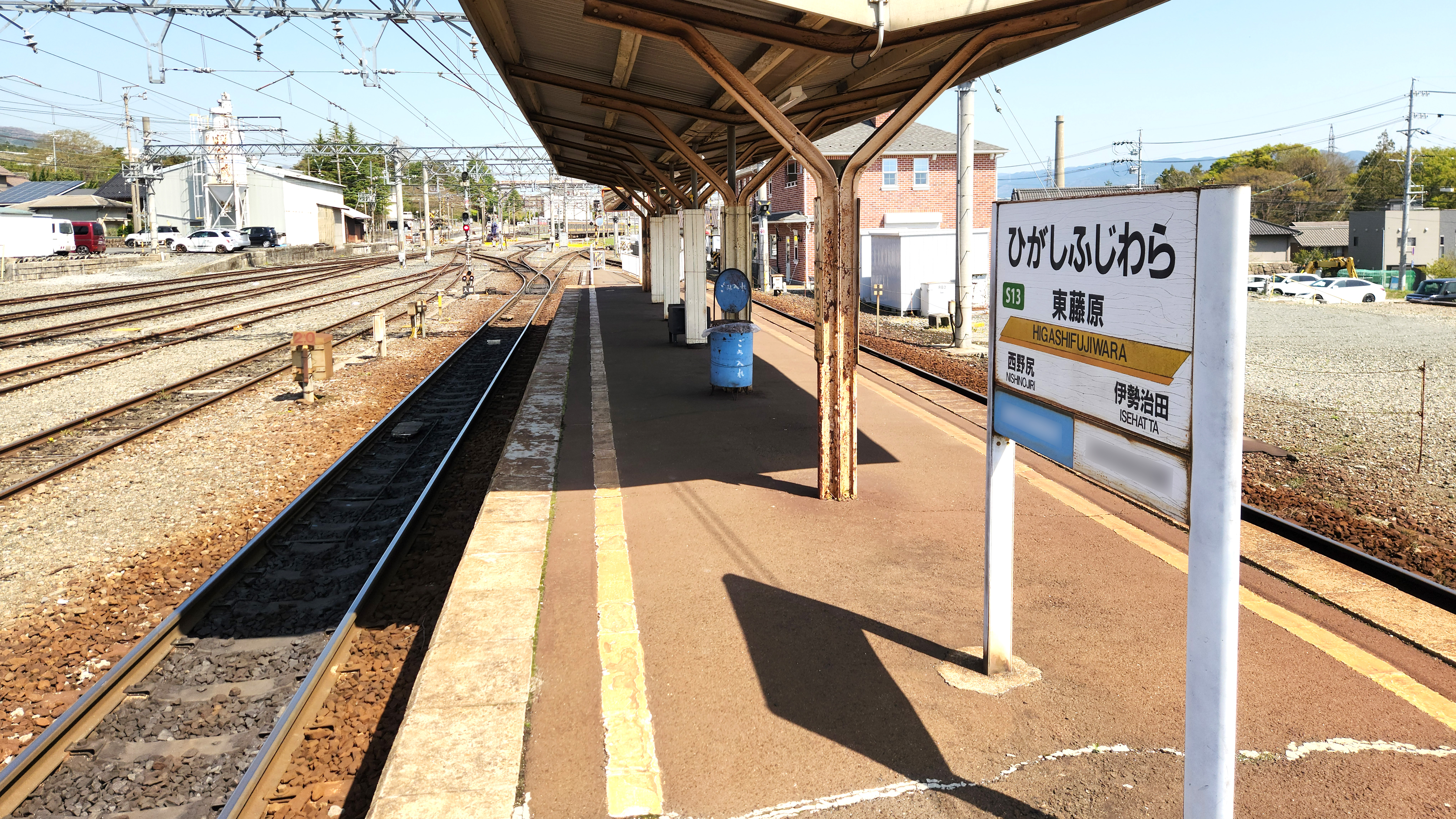
Platform in April 2025

== History ==
Higashi-Fujiwara Station was opened on July 23, 1931.

== Passenger statistics ==
In fiscal 2019, the station was used by an average of 39 passengers daily (boarding passengers only).

== Surrounding area ==
- Taiheiyo Cement Fujiwara Factory

== See also ==
- List of railway stations in Japan
