= Ise-Hatta Station =

Railway station in Inabe, Mie prefecture, Japan

Ise-Hatta Station 伊勢治田駅
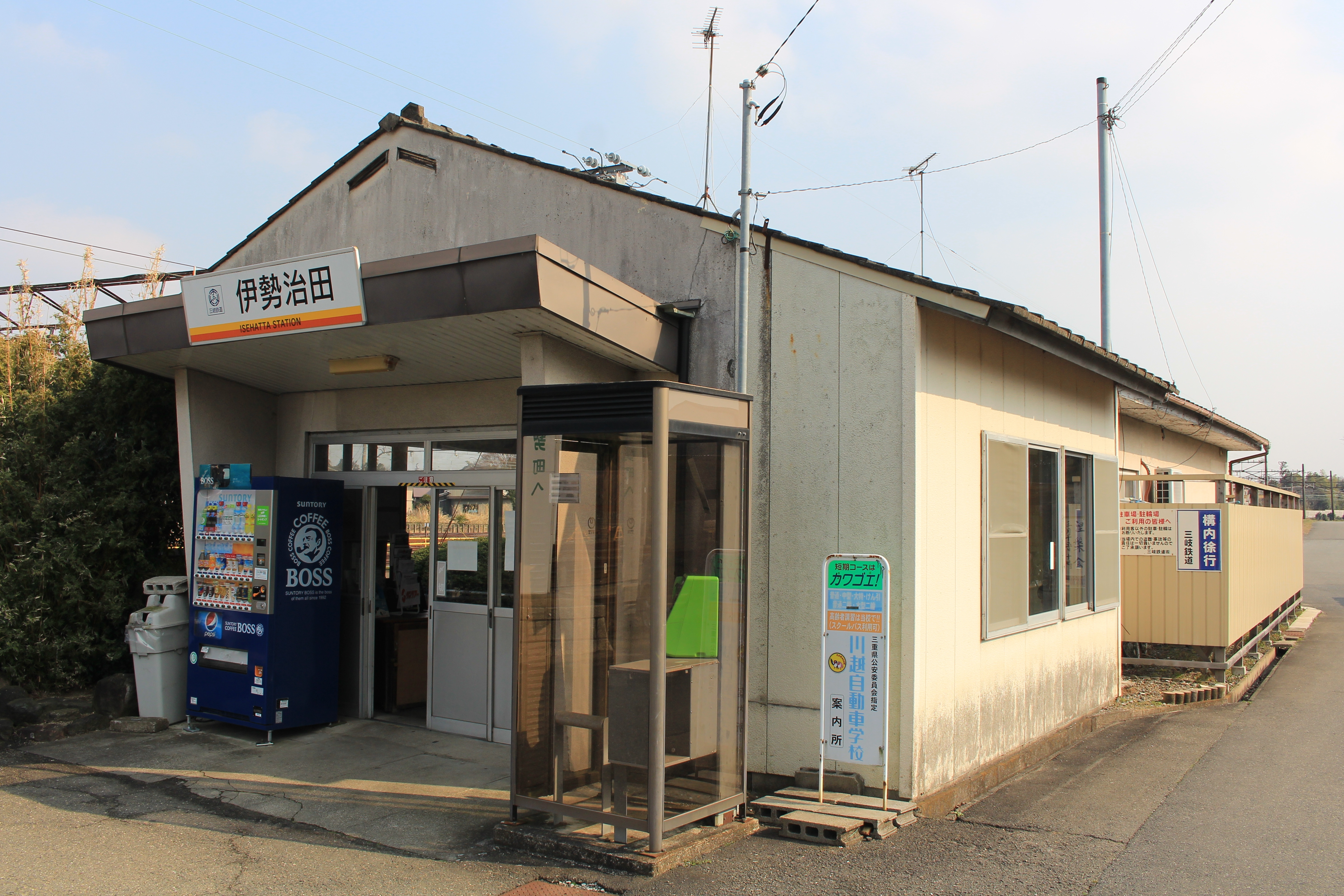
- Ise-Hatta Station in March 2016

General information
- Location: Hokusei-cho Higashi-mura 103, Inabe-shi, Mie-ken 511-0432; Japan
- Coordinates: 35°07′59.29″N 136°30′51.9″E
- Operator: Sangi Railway
- Line: Sangi Line
- Distance: 20.8 km from Kintetsu-Tomida
- Platforms: 1 island platform

History
- Opened: July 23, 1931

Passengers
- FY2019: 180 daily

Services
Preceding station	Sangi Railway	Following station
Nyūgawa towards Kintetsu-Tomida	Sangi Line	Higashi-Fujiwara towards Nishi-Fujiwara
Location
- Location within Mie Prefecture Location within Japan

Ise-Hatta Station (伊勢治田駅, Ise-Hatta-eki) is a passenger railway station located in the city of Inabe, Mie Prefecture, Japan, operated by the private railway operator Sangi Railway.

== Lines ==
Ise-Hatta Station is served by the Sangi Line, and is located 20.8 kilometres from the terminus of the line at Kintetsu-Tomida Station.

== Layout ==
The station consists of a single island platform connected to the wooden station building by a level crossing.

=== Platforms ===
1	■ Sangi Line	for Kintetsu-Tomida
2	■ Sangi Line	for Nishi-Fujiwara

== History ==
Ise-Hatta Station opened on July 23, 1931.

== Passenger statistics ==
In fiscal 2019, the station was used by an average of 180 passengers daily (boarding passengers only).

== Surrounding area ==
- Inabe City Harita Elementary School

== See also ==
- List of railway stations in Japan
