= Nyūgawa Station (Mie) =

Railway station in Inabe, Mie Prefecture, Japan

Nyūgawa Station 丹生川駅
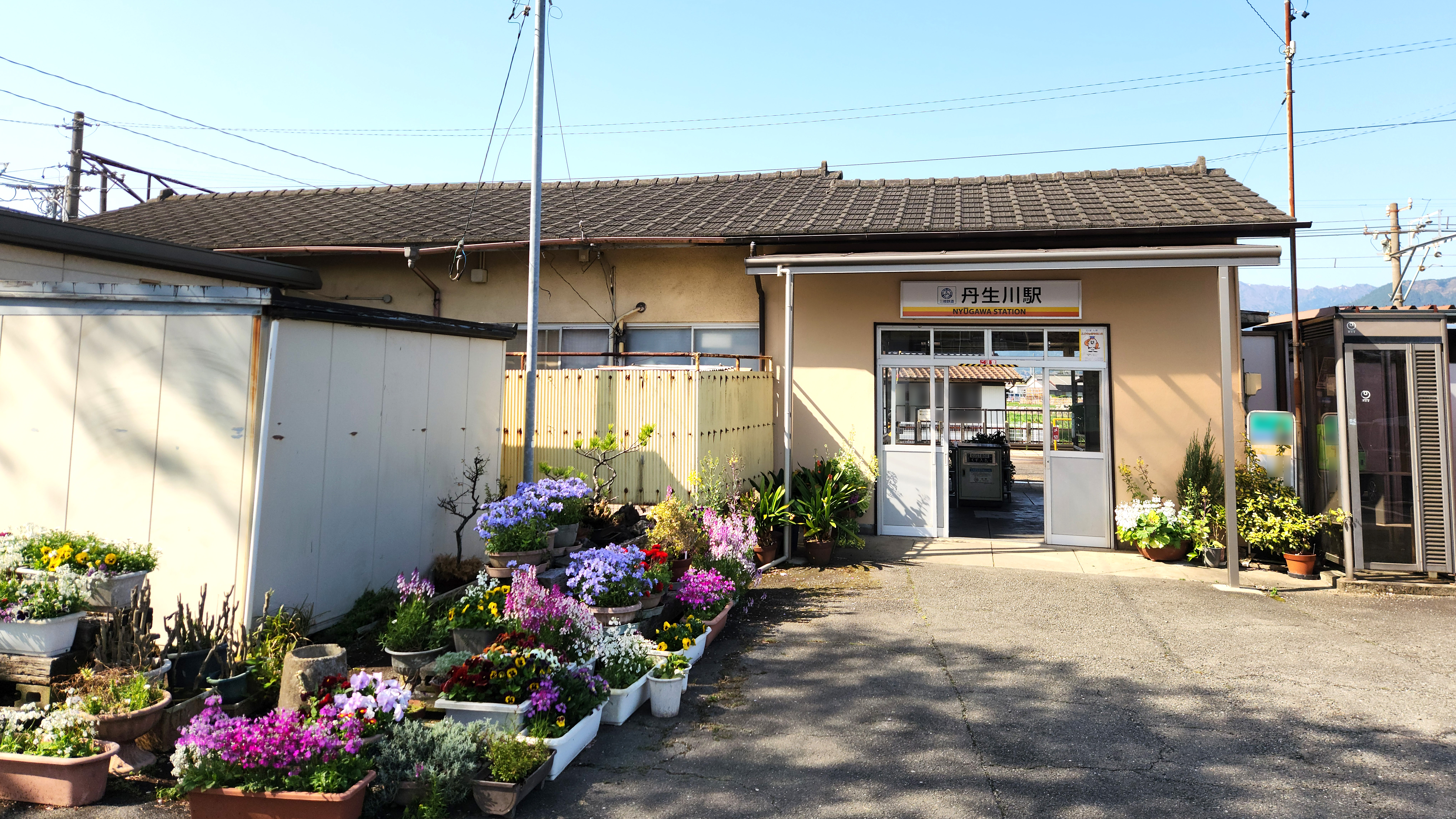
- The station building in April 2025

General information
- Location: Daian-cho Nyugawa-naka 1170-1, Inabe-shi, Mie-ken 511-0262; Japan
- Coordinates: 35°07′21.23″N 136°31′11.81″E
- Operator: Sangi Railway
- Line: Sangi Line
- Distance: 19.6 km from Kintetsu-Tomida
- Platforms: 1 island platform

History
- Opened: July 23, 1931

Passengers
- FY2019: 121 daily

Services
Preceding station	Sangi Railway	Following station
Misato towards Kintetsu-Tomida	Sangi Line	Ise-Hatta towards Nishi-Fujiwara
Location
- Location within Mie Prefecture Location within Japan

Nyūgawa Station (丹生川駅, Nyūgawa-eki) is a passenger railway station located in the city of Inabe, Mie Prefecture, Japan, operated by the private railway operator Sangi Railway.

== Lines ==
Nyūgawa Station is served by the Sangi Line, and is located 19.6 kilometres from the terminus of the line at Kintetsu-Tomida Station.

== Layout ==
The station consists of a single island platform connected to the station building by a level crossing.

=== Platforms ===
1	■ Sangi Line	For Kintetsu-Tomida
2	■ Sangi Line	For Nishi-Fujiwara

== History ==
Nyūgawa Station was opened on July 23, 1931.

== Passenger statistics ==
In fiscal 2019, the station was used by an average of 121 passengers daily (boarding passengers only).

== Surrounding area ==
- Freight Railway Museum
- Inabe City Nyugawa Elementary School

== See also ==
- List of railway stations in Japan
