= Nishi-Nojiri Station =

Railway station in Inabe, Mie prefecture, Japan

Coordinates: 35°09′50.07″N 136°29′17.71″E

Nishi-Nojiri Station 西野尻駅
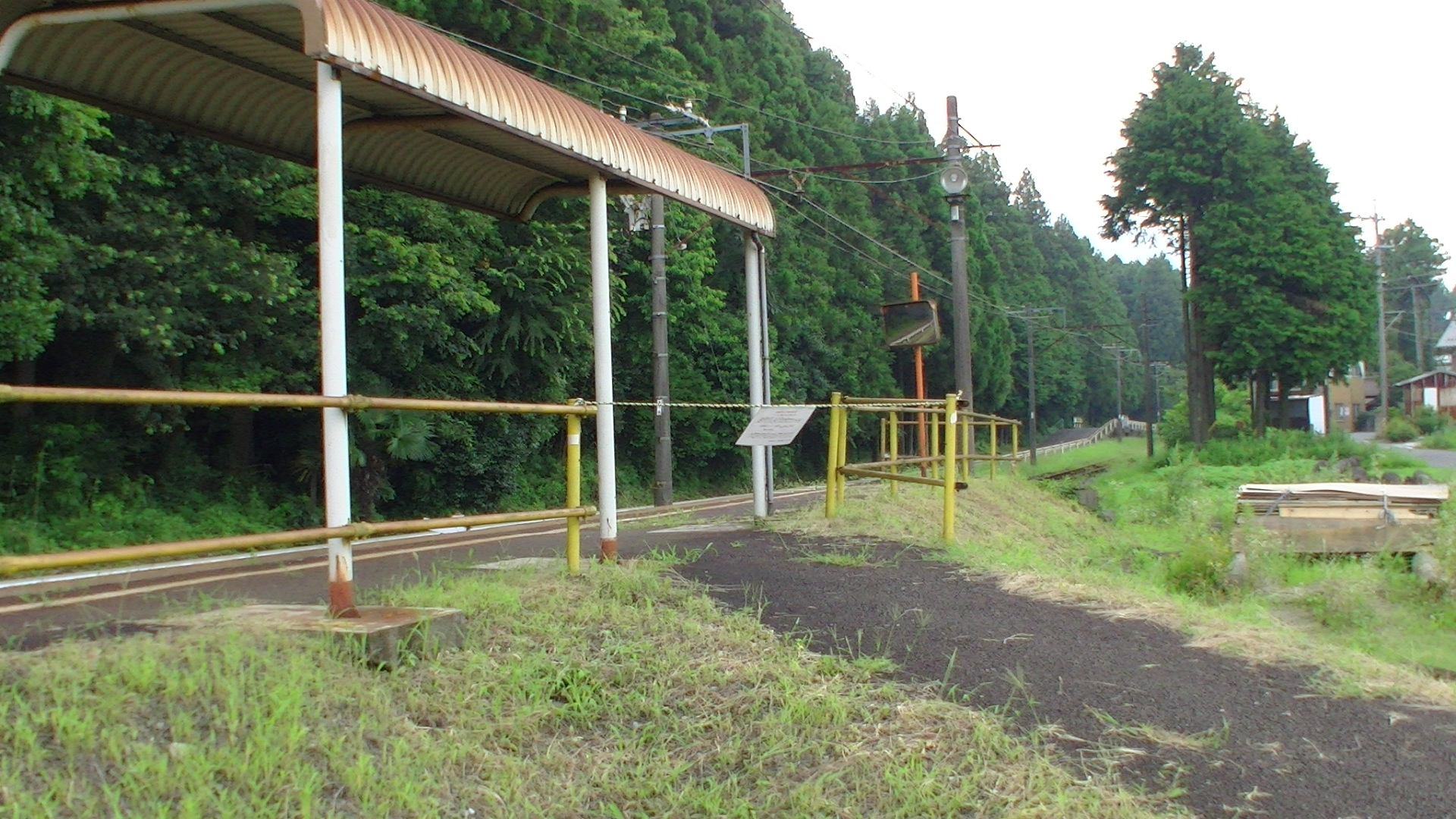
- Nishi-Nojiri Station

General information
- Location: Fujiwara-cho Nishinojiri, Inabe, Mie （三重県いなべ市藤原町西野尻） Japan
- Operator: Sangi Railway
- Line: Sangi Line

History
- Opened: 1931

Passengers
- 2024: 14 daily

Services
| Preceding station | Sangi Railway | Following station |
|---|---|---|
| Higashi-Fujiwara towards Kintetsu-Tomida | Sangi Line | Nishi-Fujiwara Terminus |
Location

Nishi-Nojiri Station (西野尻駅, Nishi-Nojiri-eki) is a railway station in Inabe, Mie Prefecture, Japan. It is located 25.3 rail kilometres from the terminus of the Sangi Line at Kintetsu-Tomida Station.

== Lines ==
- Sangi Railway
  - Sangi Line

== Layout ==
Nishi-Nojiri Station has a single side platform serving bi-directional traffic. The station is unattended.

=== Platforms ===
| 1 | ■ Sangi Line | For Kintetsu-Tomida; For Nishi-Fujiwara |

== History ==
Nishi-Nojiri Station was opened on December 23, 1931.

In 2024, the station had an annual ridership of 5,020, averaging to a daily ridership of approximately 14.
