= Daian Station =

Railway station in Inabe, Mie prefecture, Japan

Daian Station 大安駅
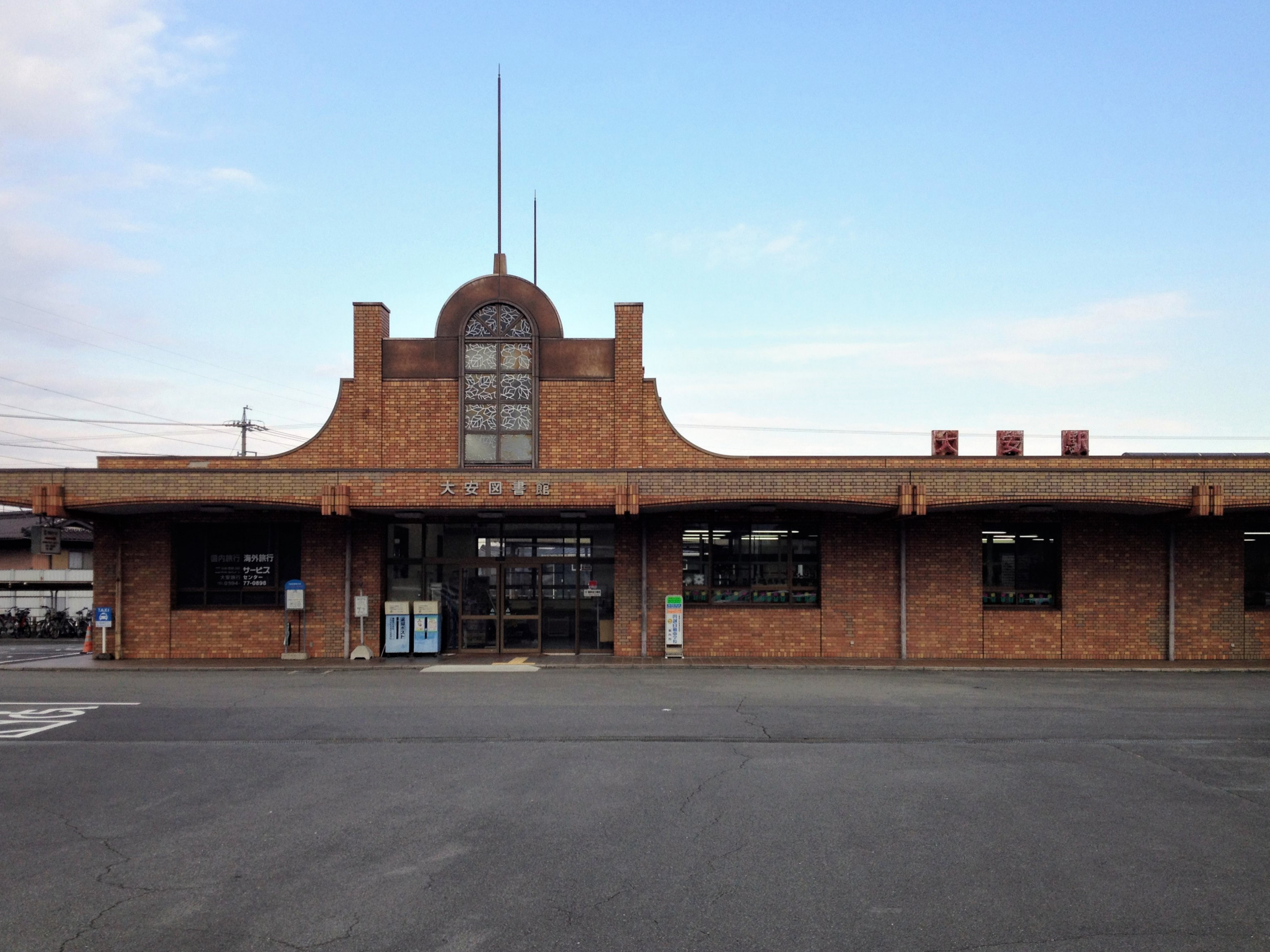
- Daian Station in December 2017

General information
- Location: 1305 Oida, Daian-cho, Inabe-shi, Mie-ken 511-0274; Japan
- Coordinates: 35°05′31.06″N 136°32′43.33″E
- Operator: Sangi Railway
- Line: Sangi Line
- Distance: 15.3 km from Kintetsu-Tomida
- Platforms: 1 side platform

History
- Opened: July 23, 1931
- Former names: Ōida (until 1986)

Passengers
- FY2019: 403 daily

Services
Preceding station	Sangi Railway	Following station
Umedoi towards Kintetsu-Tomida	Sangi Line	Misato towards Nishi-Fujiwara
Location
- Location within Mie Prefecture Location within Japan

Daian Station (大安駅, Daian-eki) is a passenger railway station located in the city of Inabe, Mie Prefecture, Japan, operated by the private railway operator Sangi Railway.

== Lines ==
Daian Station is served by the Sangi Line, and is located 15.3 kilometres from the terminus of the line at Kintetsu-Tomida Station.

== Layout ==
The station consists of a single side platform serving bi-directional traffic. The station building incorporates a travel office run by the Sangi Railway, and a library.

=== Platforms ===
1	■ Sangi Line	for Kintetsu-Tomida for Nishi-Fujiwara

== History ==
The station opened on July 23, 1931, as Ōida Station (大井田駅). The station building was rebuilt and renamed Daian Station on March 25, 1986.

== Passenger statistics ==
In fiscal 2019, the station was used by an average of 403 passengers daily (boarding passengers only).

== Surrounding area ==
- former Daian Town Hall

== See also ==
- List of railway stations in Japan
