= Misato Station (Mie) =

Railway station in Inabe, Mie prefecture, Japan

Misato Station 三里駅
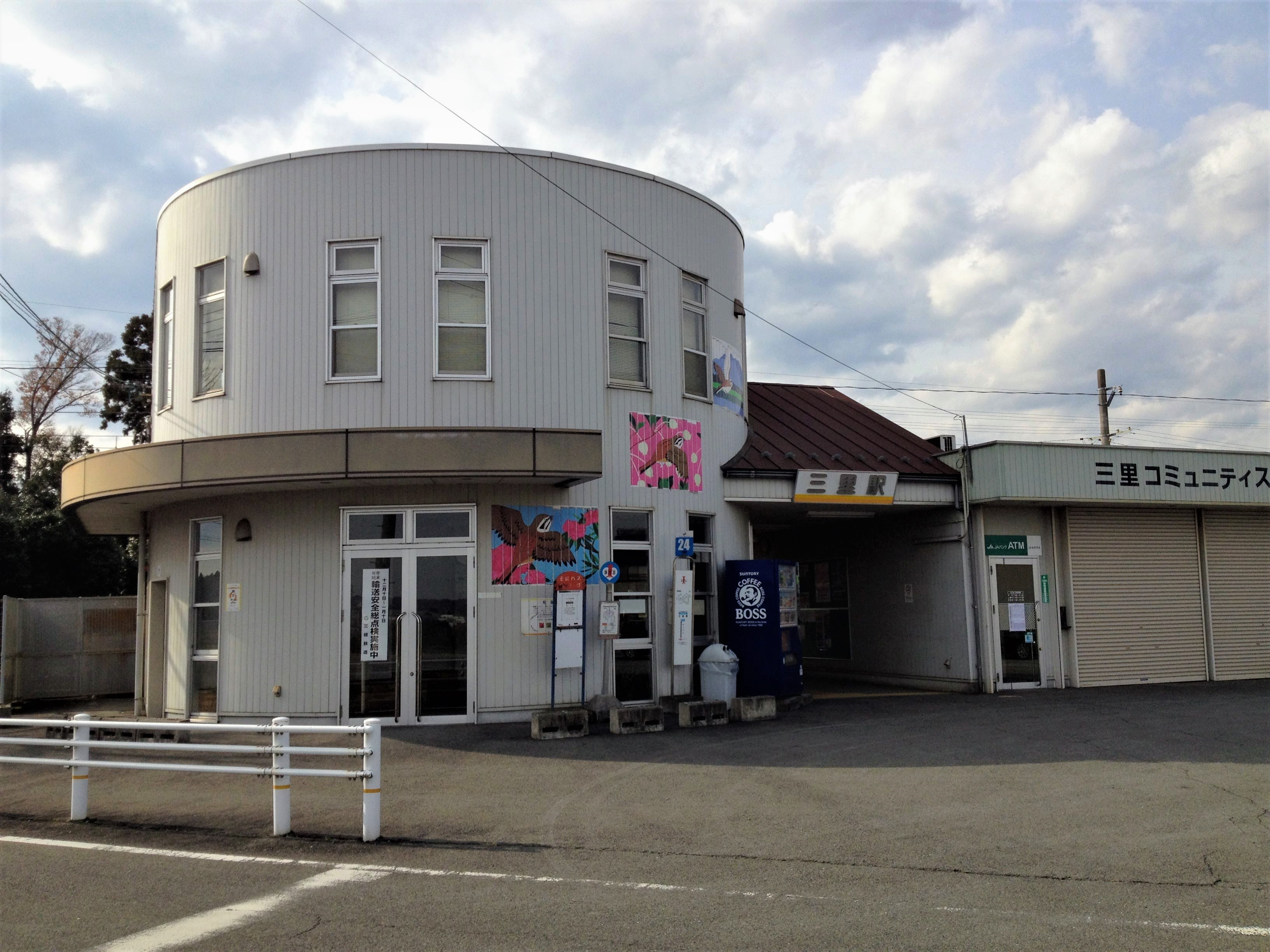
- Misato Station, December 2017

General information
- Location: Daian-cho Hiratsuka 512-11, Inabe-shi, Mie-ken 511-0273; Japan
- Coordinates: 35°06′25.23″N 136°32′19.29″E
- Operator: Sangi Railway
- Line: Sangi Line
- Distance: 17.1 km from Kintetsu-Tomida
- Platforms: 1 island platform

History
- Opened: July 23, 1931

Passengers
- FY2019: 311 daily

Services
Preceding station	Sangi Railway	Following station
Daian towards Kintetsu-Tomida	Sangi Line	Nyūgawa towards Nishi-Fujiwara
Location
- Location within Mie Prefecture Location within Japan

Misato Station (三里駅, Misato-eki) is a passenger railway station located in the city of Inabe, Mie Prefecture, Japan, operated by the private railway operator Sangi Railway.

== Lines ==
Misato Station is served by the Sangi Line, and is located 17.1 kilometres from the terminus of the line at Kintetsu-Tomida Station.

== Layout ==
The station consists of a single island platform connected to the station building by a level crossing.

=== Platforms ===
1	■ Sangi Line	For Kintetsu-Tomida
2	■ Sangi Line	For Nishi-Fujiwara

== History ==
Misato Station was opened on July 23, 1931. From June 1, 1968, to March 25, 1986, the station was named Ugakeiguchi Station (宇賀渓口駅). The station building was rebuilt in 1986. On November 8, 2012, a derailment accident occurred at this station.

== Passenger statistics ==
In fiscal 2019, the station was used by an average of 311 passengers daily (boarding passengers only).

== Surrounding area ==
- Inabe City Misato Elementary School

== See also ==
- List of railway stations in Japan
