= Hobo Station (Mie) =

Railway station in Yokkaichi, Mie Prefecture, Japan

Hobo Station 保々駅
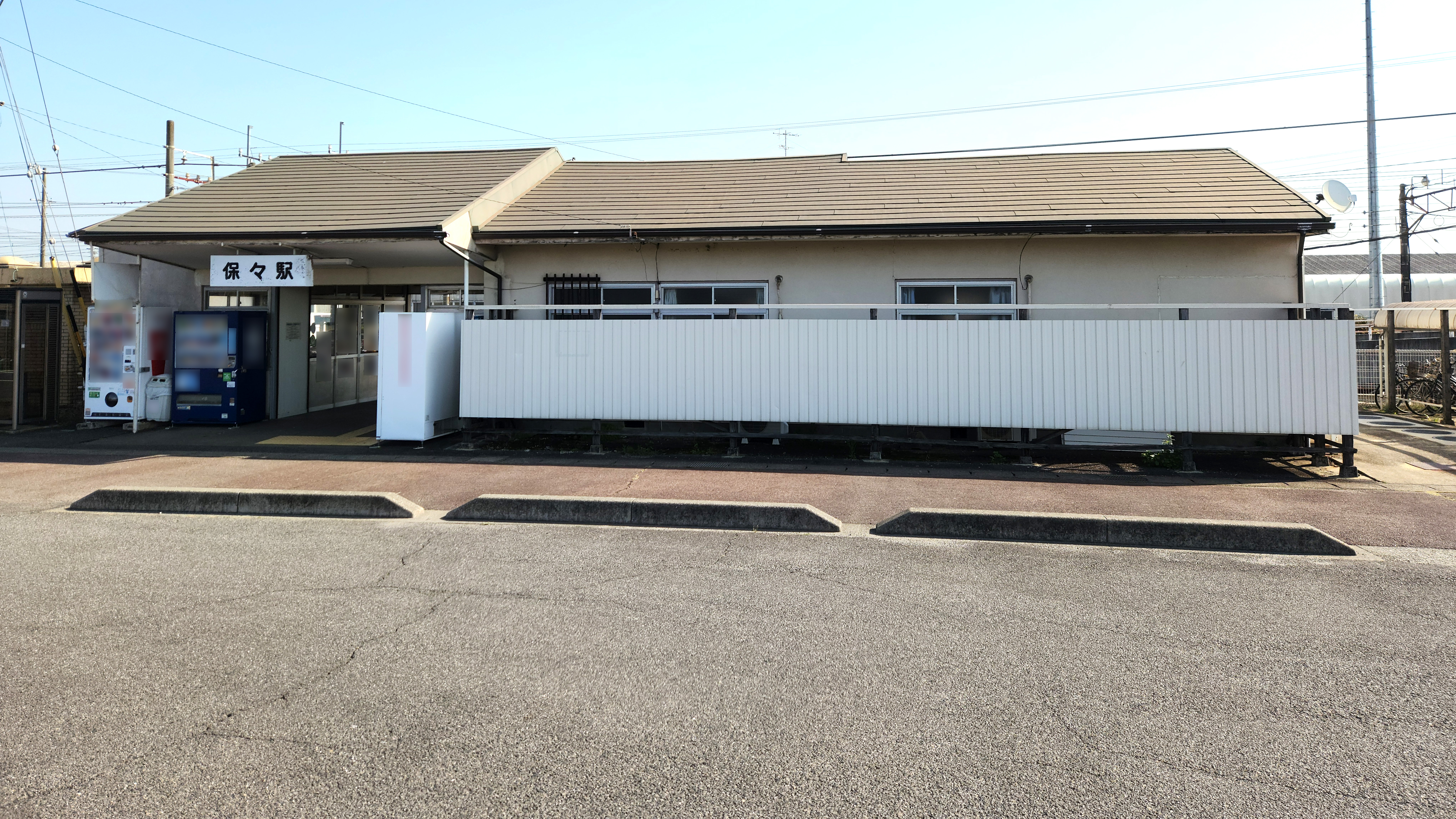
- The station building in April 2025

General information
- Location: Komaki-cho 1937, Yokkaichi-shi, Mie-ken 512-1303; Japan
- Coordinates: 35°02′48.63″N 136°33′56.13″E
- Operator: Sangi Railway
- Line: Sangi Line
- Distance: 9.5 km from Kintetsu-Tomida
- Platforms: 1 island platform

History
- Opened: July 23, 1931

Passengers
- FY2019: 583 daily

Services
| Preceding station | Sangi Railway | Following station |
|---|---|---|
| Yamajō towards Kintetsu-Tomida | Sangi Line | Hokusei Chūō Kōenguchi towards Nishi-Fujiwara |
Location
- Location within Mie Prefecture Location within Japan

Hobo Station (保々駅, Hobo-eki) is a passenger railway station located in the city of Yokkaichi, Mie Prefecture, Japan, operated by the private railway operator Sangi Railway.

The station is used as a central station for the Sangi Railway, with a rail yard and a control center.

== Lines ==
Hobo Station is served by the Sangi Line, and is located 9.5 kilometres from the terminus of the line at Kintetsu-Tomida Station.

== Layout ==
The station consists of a single island platform connected to the station building by a level crossing.

=== Platforms ===
| 1 | ■ Sangi Line | For Kintetsu-Tomida |
| 2 | ■ Sangi Line | For Nishi-Fujiwara |

== History ==
Hobo Station was opened on July 23, 1931.

== Passenger statistics ==
In fiscal 2019, the station was used by an average of 583 passengers daily (boarding passengers only).

== Surrounding area ==
- Yokkaichi City Hall Hobo District Citizen Center
- Yokkaichi Municipal Hobo Elementary School
- Yokkaichi Municipal Hobo Junior High School
- Mie Prefectural Asahi High School

There used to be a Museum of Scales, called "秤乃館", but closed in March 30th 2014.

== See also ==
- List of railway stations in Japan
