= Ōyachi Station =

Ōyachi Station may refer to:

- Ōyachi Station (Hokkaido), a train station in Hokkaido, Japan
- Ōyachi Station (Mie), a train station in Mie Prefecture, Japan
