= Hokusei, Mie =

Former Japanese town

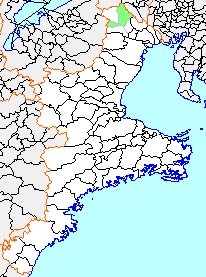

Hokusei (北勢町, Hokusei-chō) was a town located in Inabe District, Mie Prefecture, Japan.

On December 1, 2003, Hokusei, along with the towns of Inabe (former), Daian, and Fujiwara (all from Inabe District), was merged to create the city of Inabe.
