= Ōyachi Station (Mie) =

Railway station in Yokkaichi, Mie Prefecture, Japan

Ōyachi Station 大矢知駅
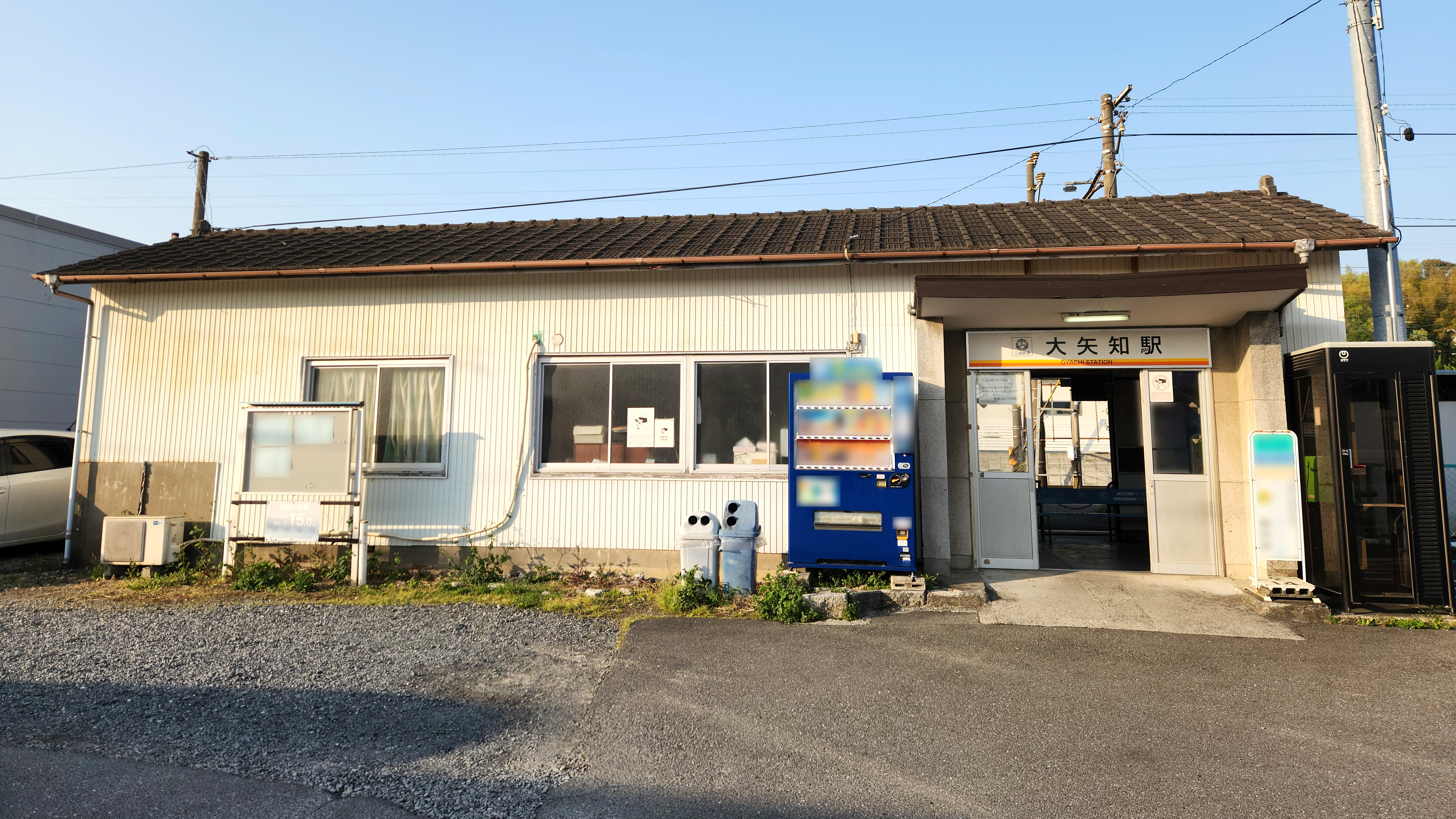
- Station building in April 2025

General information
- Location: 3279 Ōyachi-cho, Yokkaichi-shi, Mie-ken 510-8034; Japan
- Coordinates: 35°01′19.26″N 136°38′2.1″E
- Operator: Sangi Railway
- Line: Sangi Line
- Distance: 2.5 km from Kintetsu-Tomida
- Platforms: 1 island platforms

History
- Opened: July 23, 1931

Passengers
- FY2019: 369 daily

Services
Preceding station	Sangi Railway	Following station
Kintetsu-Tomida Terminus	Sangi Line	Heizu towards Nishi-Fujiwara
Location
- Location within Mie Prefecture Location within Japan

Ōyachi Station (大矢知駅, Ōyachi-eki) is a passenger railway station located in the city of Yokkaichi, Mie Prefecture, Japan, operated by the private railway operator Sangi Railway.

== Lines ==
Ōyachi Station is served by the Sangi Line, and is located 2.5 kilometres from the terminus of the line at Kintetsu-Tomida Station.

== Layout ==
The station consists of a single island platform connected to the station building by a level crossing.

=== Platforms ===
1	■ Sangi Line	for Kintetsu-Tomida
2	■ Sangi Line	for Nishi-Fujiwara

== History ==
Ōyachi Station was opened on July 23, 1931.

== Passenger statistics ==
In fiscal 2019, the station was used by an average of 369 passengers daily (boarding passengers only).

== Surrounding area ==
- Yokkaichi Municipal Oyachikojo Elementary School
- Kurube Kanga ruins

== See also ==
- List of railway stations in Japan
