= Nyūgawa Station =

Nyūgawa Station is the name of two train stations in Japan:

- Nyūgawa Station (Ehime) (壬生川駅)
- Nyūgawa Station (Mie) (丹生川駅)
