= Misato Station =

Misato Station is the name of three train stations in Japan:

- Misato Station (Mie) (三里駅)
- Misato Station (Nagano) (美里駅)
- Misato Station (Saitama) (三郷駅)
