= Daian, Mie =

Dissolved municipality in Mie prefecture, Japan

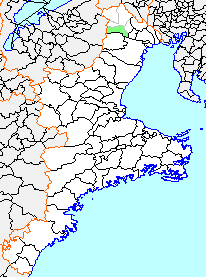

Daian (大安町, Daian-chō) was a town located in Inabe District, Mie Prefecture, Japan.

On December 1, 2003, Daian, along with the towns of Inabe (former), Hokusei, and Fujiwara (all from Inabe District), was merged to create the city of Inabe.
