= Inabe, Mie (town) =

Dissolved municipality in Mie prefecture, Japan

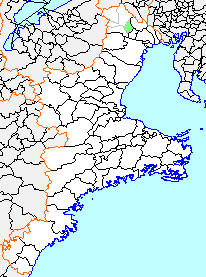

Inabe (員弁町, Inabe-chō) was a town located in Inabe District, Mie Prefecture, Japan.

On December 1, 2003, Inabe absorbed the towns of Hokusei, Daian and Fujiwara (all from Inabe District) to create the city of Inabe.
