= Fujiwara, Mie =

Dissolved municipality in Mie prefecture, Japan

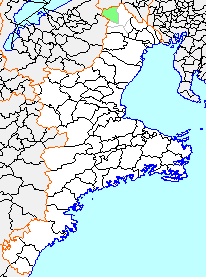

Fujiwara (藤原町, Fujiwara-chō) was a town located in Inabe District, Mie Prefecture, Japan.

On December 1, 2003, Fujiwara, along with the towns of Inabe (former), Hokusei and Daian (all from Inabe District), was merged to create the city of Inabe.
