= Inabe District =

District in Mie prefecture, Japan

Coordinates: 35.0752°N 136.584°E

Location of Inabe District in Mie Prefecture

Inabe (員弁郡, Inabe-gun) is a district located in Mie Prefecture, Japan.

As of 2005, the district has an estimated population of 26,312 and a population density of 1,161.2 people per km^{2}. The total area is 22.66 km^{2}.

== Towns and villages ==
- Tōin

== Mergers ==
- December 1, 2003 - The towns of Inabe, Hokusei, Daian, and Fujiwara merged to form the new city of Inabe. (1 town)
