= Sangi Railway Sangi Line =

Railway line in Mie Prefecture, Japan

Sangi Line

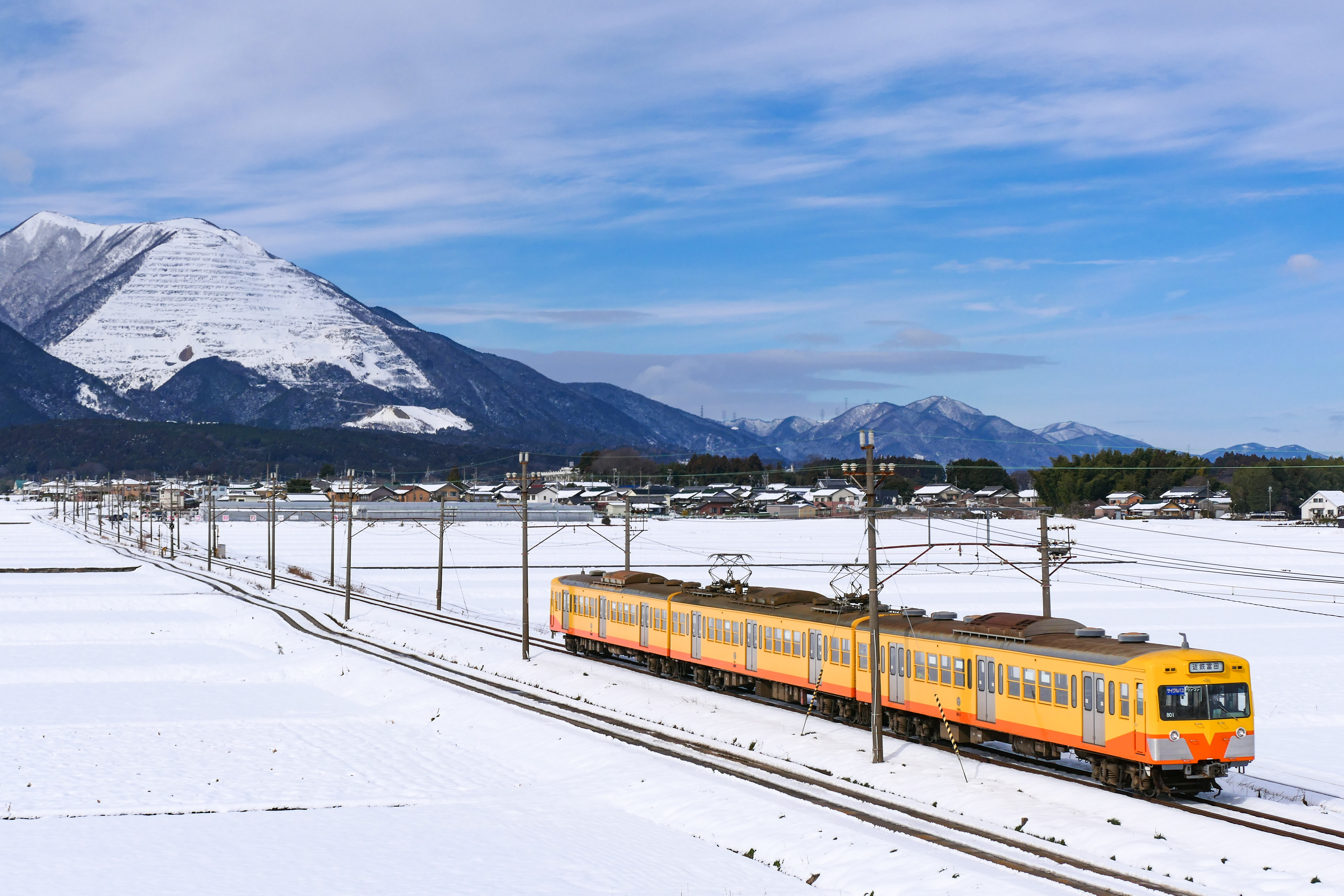
- A Sangi Line 801 series train bound for Kintetsu-Tomida Station, with Mount Fujiwara visible in the background

Overview
- Locale: Mie Prefecture
- Termini: Kintetsu-Tomida; Nishi-Fujiwara
- Stations: 15 on the Sangi Line, 1 on the Kintetsu Line

Service
- Type: Commuter rail
- Operator: Sangi Railway

History
- Opened: 23 July 1931; 95 years ago

Technical
- Line length: 26.5 km (16.5 mi)
- Number of tracks: 1
- Track gauge: 1,067 mm (3 ft 6 in)
- Electrification: Overhead, 1,500 V DC
- Operating speed: 70 km/h (43 mph)

The Sangi Line (三岐線, Sangi-sen) is a 1,067 mm (3 ft 6 in) narrow gauge railway line owned and operated by Sangi Railway, a Japanese private railway company. The line runs in Mie Prefecture and connects Nishi-Fujiwara Station in Inabe with Tomida and Kintetsu-Tomida Station in Yokkaichi. The section between Tomita Station and Sangi-asake Signal Station is exclusively for freight trains, with passenger trains providing through service to Kintetsu-Tomita Station via the Kintetsu Line. All trains depart from and arrive at Kintetsu-Tomita Station.

The name Sangi (三岐) is a combination of the first characters from Mie (三重) and Gifu (岐阜) as, in 1928, it was originally envisioned to connect the city of Yokkaichi in Mie to Sekigahara via Kamiishizu in Ōgaki, Gifu Prefecture.

The Sangi Line is an electrified, single-track line. Freight services also operate on the line, carrying mainly cement.

== Services ==
All services are classified as "Local" (普通, futsū), stopping at every station, and are driver-only operations. There are 1–2 services per hour during the day, increased to 3–4 per hour during the morning peak.

== Stations ==
Station		Distance (km)	Transfers	Location	
Tomida (freight only)	富田	–		Yokkaichi	Mie Prefecture
Kintetsu-Tomida	近鉄富田	0.0	Kintetsu Nagoya Line	Yokkaichi	Mie Prefecture
Sangi-asake Signal Station	三岐朝明信号場	1.1		Yokkaichi	Mie Prefecture
Ōyachi	大矢知	2.5		Yokkaichi	Mie Prefecture
Heizu	平津	4.1		Yokkaichi	Mie Prefecture
Akatsuki Gakuenmae	暁学園前	5.3		Yokkaichi	Mie Prefecture
Yamajō	山城	7.0		Yokkaichi	Mie Prefecture
Hobo	保々	9.5		Yokkaichi	Mie Prefecture
Hokusei Chūō Kōenguchi	北勢中央公園口	11.2		Yokkaichi	Mie Prefecture
Umedoi	梅戸井	13.1		Inabe	Mie Prefecture
Daian	大安	15.3		Inabe	Mie Prefecture
Misato	三里	17.1		Inabe	Mie Prefecture
Nyūgawa	丹生川	19.6		Inabe	Mie Prefecture
Ise-Hatta	伊勢治田	20.8		Inabe	Mie Prefecture
Higashi-Fujiwara	東藤原	23.1		Inabe	Mie Prefecture
Nishi-Nojiri	西野尻	25.3		Inabe	Mie Prefecture
Nishi-Fujiwara	西藤原	26.5		Inabe	Mie Prefecture

== History ==
- 1928:

- 9 March: Subsidies for railway licenses to Fujiwara Railway (Yokkaichi City-Sekigahara Town, Fuwa District, Yokkaichi City-Shiohama Village, Mie District, Onaga Village, Inabe District-Tomita Town, Mie District, Mie Village, Mie District-Kawashima Village, Mie District) were issued.
- 20 September: Sangi Railway was established

- 1931:

- 23 July: Section from Tomida Station (now operated by JR) to Higashi Fujiwara was opened.
- 23 December: Section from Higashi Fujiwara to Nishi Fujiwara was opened.

- 1937

- 2 December: Railway license expired (Nishifujiwara-mura, Inabe-gun-Sekigahara-cho, Fuwa-gun designated deadline Mateni construction work approval application)

- 1950

- 30 October: Sangi Asaki station opened in between Tomida and Oyachima stations.

- 1952

- 1 December: Direct passenger train operation started from Tomida Station to Yokkaichi Station on the Japanese National Railways

- 1954

- 29 March: All lines are electrified and electric locomotives are used for freight trains

- 1964

- 1 October: Direct passenger train operation from Tomida Station to Yokkaichi Station was cut.

- 1965

- 1 July: Tomida Nishiguchi station opened
- 21 August: Kayou Station was renamed to Akatsuki Gakuenmae station

- 1968

- Misato Station was renamed to Ugakeiguchi Station

- 1970

- 25 June: The section from Kintetsu-Tomida to Sangi Asaki

- 1974

- The section from Tomida/Kintetsu-Tomida - Higashi Fujiwara becomes CTC compatible

- 1985

- 14 March: Sanuki Asaki and Tomida Nishiguchi stations closed
- 16 May: Driverless operation began for freight services.

- 1986

- 25 March: Ōida station was relocated and renamed to Dainan station. Ugakeiguchi station was renamed back to Misato station

- 1988

- 7 January: Driverless operation began for passenger services.

- 1989

- 1 April: Sangi Asaki station became Sangi Asaki signal box. The morning express service that was operated was cut.

- 1994

- 3 December: The line speed was increased from 60 km/h (37 mph) to 70 km/h (43 mph)

- 1994

- 1 April: Ōchō station was relocated and renamed to Hokusei Chūō Kōenguchi

- 2011

- 4 September: Typhoon 12 struck and the entire line was closed due to the Asake River flowing over its banks.
- 6 September: Kintetsu-Tomida to Yamajo and Misato to Nishi-Fujiwara were reopened following the Typhoon.
- 7 September: Yamajo to Hodo reopened.
- 8 September: Umedoi to Misato reopened.
- 11 October: Hodo to Umedoi reopened, thus reopening the entire line.

- 2012

- 8 February: A derailment of an electric train occurred at Higashi-Fujiwara, and as a result, all services between Ise Hatta and Nishi Fujiwara were suspended.
- 30 June: The section between Ise Hatta and Nishi Fujiwara reopened following the derailment 4 months prior.
- 8 November: A 3 car passenger train derailed at Misato station, and as a result, the section from Umedoi to Nishi Fujiwara was suspended.
- 11 November: Umedoi to Higashi Fujiwara reopened. Rail replacement buses ran from Higashi Fujiwara to Nishi Fujiwara

- 2013

- 12 January: Higashi Fujiwara to Nishi Fujiwara section reopened following the derailment in November 2012.

== Gallery ==
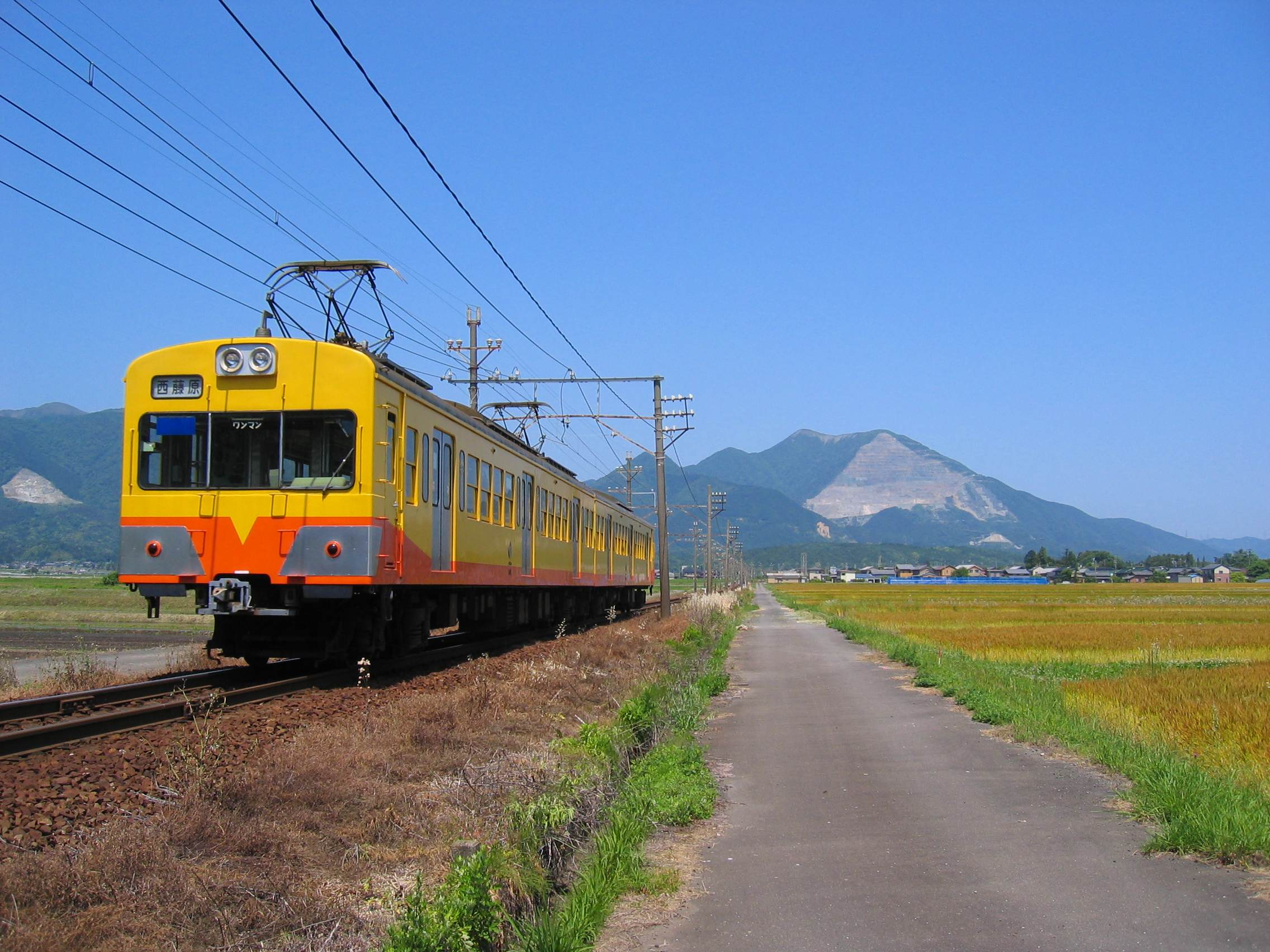
A train between Misato and Nyūgawa Stations
