= Inabe =

Inabe いなべ市
- City
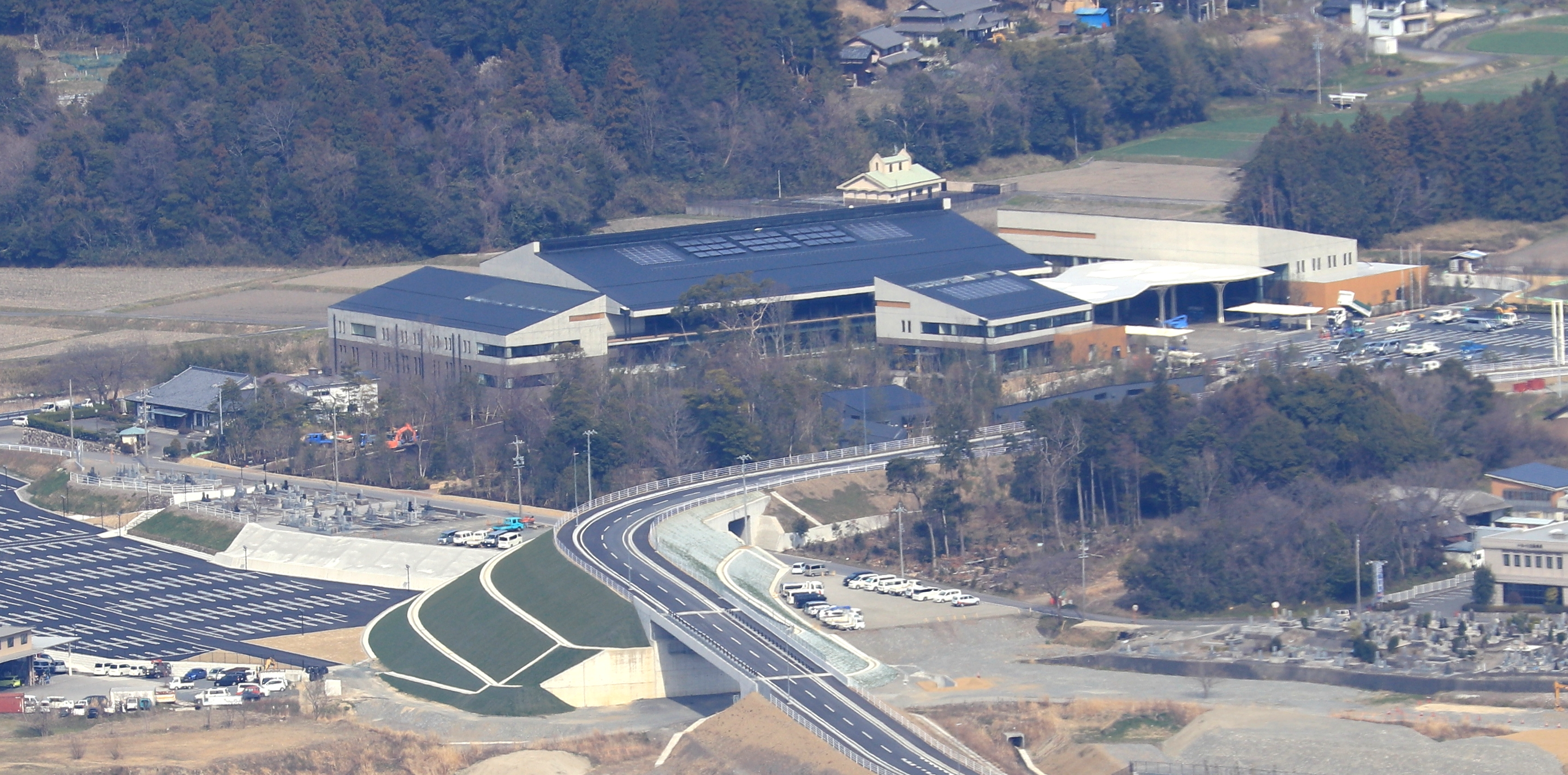
- Inabe City Hall

- Flag Seal

- Location of Inabe in Mie Prefecture

- Coordinates: 35°6′56″N 136°33′41″E
- Country: Japan
- Region: Kansai
- Prefecture: Mie

Government
  - Mayor: Yasushi Hioki

Area
  - Total: 219.58 km^{2} (84.78 sq mi)

Population (August 2021)
  - Total: 43,114
  - Density: 196.35/km^{2} (508.54/sq mi)
- Time zone: UTC+9 (Japan Standard Time)
- Phone number: 0594-74-5820
- Address: 111 Kasada-shinden, Inabe-chō, Inabe-shi, Mie-ken 511-0293
- Website: Official website

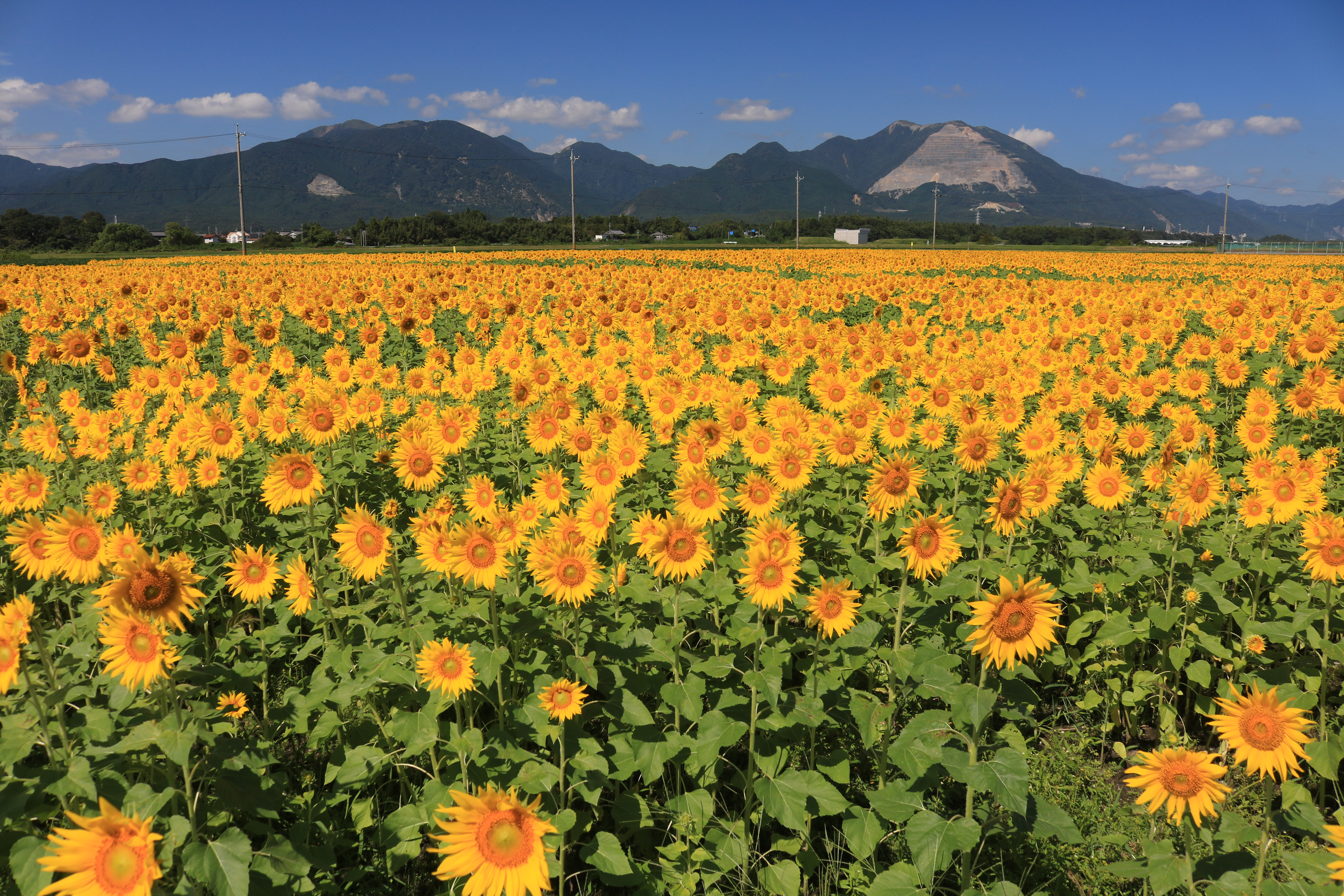
Mount Ryu and Mount Fujiwara with Sunflower field

Inabe (いなべ市, Inabe-shi; Japanese pronunciation: [í.nä̀.bè̞, ì.nä́.bé̞(.ɕì)]) is a city located in Mie Prefecture, Japan. As of 1 August 2021, the city had an estimated population of 43,114 in 17,314 households and a population density of 200 persons per km^{2}. The total area of the city is 219.58 square kilometres (84.78 sq mi).

== Geography ==
Inabe is located in the far northeastern tip of the Kii Peninsula, and the far northwestern corner of Mie Prefecture, along the border with Gifu and Shiga prefectures. The Inabe River flows through the city center.

=== Neighboring municipalities ===
- Gifu Prefecture
  - Kaizu
  - Ōgaki
  - Yōrō
- Mie Prefecture
  - Komono
  - Kuwana
  - Tōin
  - Yokkaichi
- Shiga Prefecture
  - Higashiōmi
  - Taga

== Climate ==
Inabe has a humid subtropical climate (Köppen Cfa) characterized by warm summers and cool winters with light to no snowfall. The average annual temperature in Inabe is 13.0 °C. The average annual rainfall is 1960 mm with September as the wettest month.

Climate data for Hokusei（1981 - 2010）
Month	Jan	Feb	Mar	Apr	May	Jun	Jul	Aug	Sep	Oct	Nov	Dec	Year
Average precipitation mm (inches)	74.1 (2.92)	93.2 (3.67)	152.4 (6.00)	178.9 (7.04)	231.9 (9.13)	290.4 (11.43)	289.2 (11.39)	213.4 (8.40)	286.4 (11.28)	144.5 (5.69)	97.1 (3.82)	65.9 (2.59)	2,117.4 (83.36)
Average precipitation days (≥ 1.0 mm)	10.5	10.4	12.0	10.3	11.6	13.4	14.3	11.0	12.3	9.6	8.3	9.8	133.5
Source: Japan Meteorological Agency

== Demographics ==
Per Japanese census data, the population of Inabe has remained relatively steady over the past 30 years.

Historical population
Year	Pop.	±%
1920	32,074	—
1930	34,058	+6.2%
1940	32,920	−3.3%
1950	43,568	+32.3%
1960	40,007	−8.2%
1970	38,414	−4.0%
1980	41,591	+8.3%
1990	43,882	+5.5%
2000	45,630	+4.0%
2010	45,675	+0.1%

== History ==
The area of modern Inabe was part of ancient Ise Province was mostly under the control of Kuwana Domain in then Edo period. With the creation of the modern municipalities system on April 1, 1889, the village of Ageki was established within Inabe District, Mie. Ageki was raised to town status on March 10, 1929, and merged with the neighboring villages of Toyashiro and Yamasato on April 1, 1955, to form the town of Hokusei. The city of Inabe was established on December 1, 2003, from the merger of the former town of Hokusei with neighboring Inabe, Daian, and Fujiwara.

== Government ==
Inabe has a mayor-council form of government with a directly elected mayor and a unicameral city council of 18 members. Inabe, together with the town of Tōin, contributes two members to the Mie Prefectural Assembly. In terms of national politics, the city is part of Mie 3rd district of the lower house of the Diet of Japan.

== Economy ==
Inabe is a regional commercial center and has a mixed industrial and agricultural economy. Toyota Motor, Denso and other automobile-related industries form a strong component of the local economy.

== Education ==
Inabe has 11 public elementary schools and four public middle schools operated by the city government and one public high school operated by the Mie Prefectural Department of Education.

== Transportation ==
=== Railway ===
Sangi Railway – Sangi Line

- Umedoi – Daian - Misato – Nyūgawa – Ise-Hatta - Higashi-Fujiwara – Nishi-Nojiri – Nishi-Fujiwara

Sangi Railway – Hokusei Line

- Ōizumi – Sohara - Ohda – Ageki

=== Highway ===
- National Route 306
- National Route 365
- National Route 421

== Local attractions ==
- Freight Railway Museum

== Notable people ==
- Kiyoshi Itô, mathematician
- Tatsuma Itō, tennis player
- Yūji Nishida, volleyball player
- Junto Nakatani, boxer
