= Kintetsu-Tomida Station =

Railway station in Yokkaichi, Mie Prefecture, Japan

Kintetsu-Tomida Station 近鉄富田駅
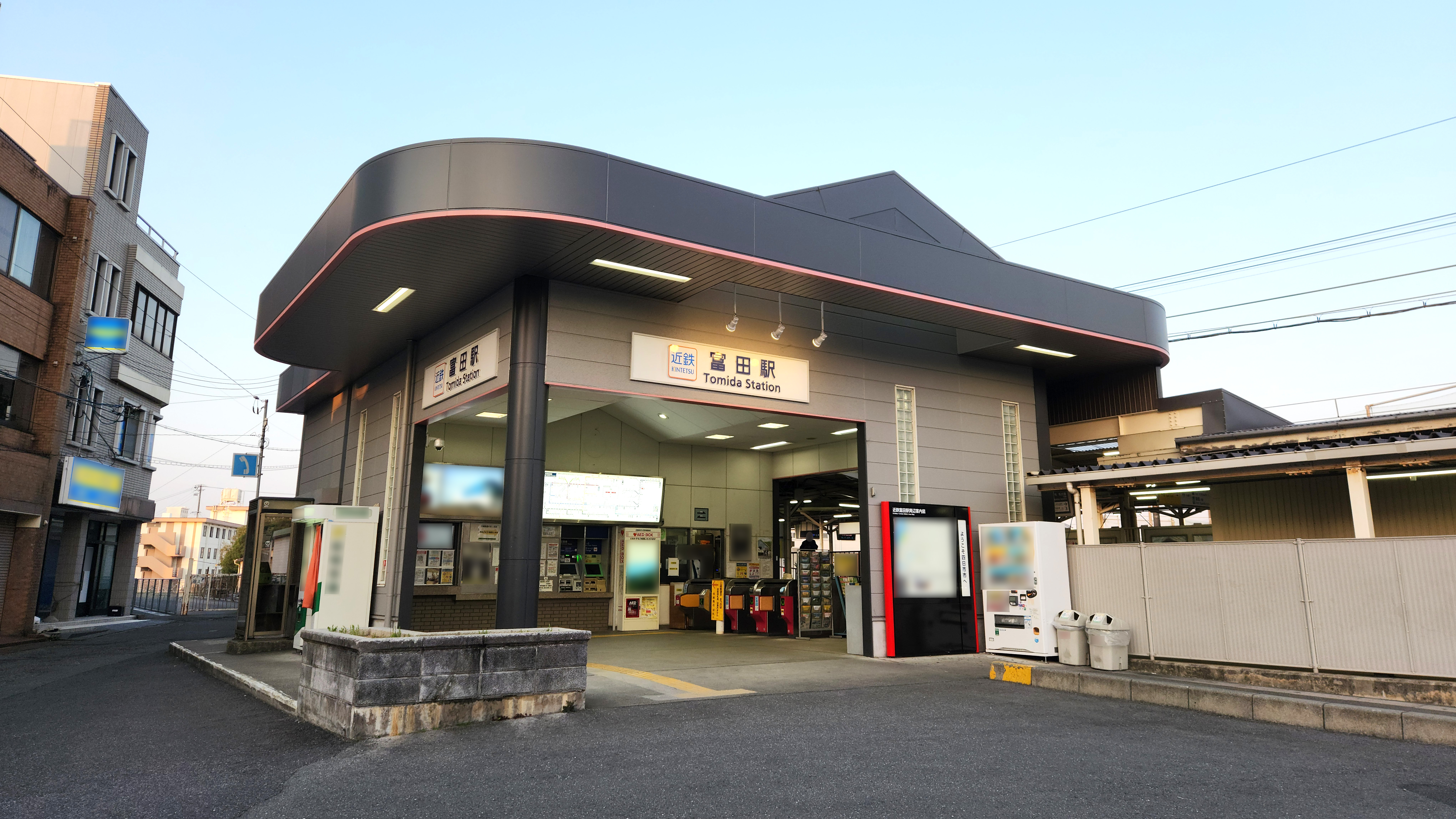
- The east station building in April 2025

General information
- Location: 1-26-19 Tomida-chō, Yokkaichi-shi, Mie-ken 510-8014; Japan
- Coordinates: 35°0′24.53″N 136°38′58.94″E
- Operator: Kintetsu Railway; Sangi Railway
- Lines: Nagoya Line; Sangi Line
- Distance: 31.6 km from Kintetsu Nagoya
- Platforms: 1 side + 1 island platform

Other information
- Station code: E17
- Website: Official website

History
- Opened: January 30, 1929
- Former names: Nishi-Tomida (to 1941); Kankyu-Tomida (to 1944); Kinki-Nihon Tomida (to 1970)

Passengers
- FY2019: 9,722 daily (Kintetsu); 3,549 daily (Sangi Railway)

Services
Preceding station	Kintetsu Railway	Following station
Kasumigaura E18 towards Ise-Nakagawa	Nagoya Line Local	Kawagoe Tomisuhara E16 towards Kintetsu-Nagoya
Kasumigaura E18 towards Kintetsu Yokkaichi	Nagoya Line Semi-Express	Kawagoe Tomisuhara E16 towards Kintetsu-Nagoya
Kintetsu Yokkaichi E21 towards Ise-Nakagawa	Nagoya Line Express	Kuwana E13 towards Kintetsu-Nagoya
Preceding station	Sangi Railway	Following station
Terminus	Sangi Line	Ōyachi towards Nishi-Fujiwara
Location
- Location within Mie Prefecture Location within Japan

Kintetsu-Tomida Station (近鉄富田駅, Kintetsu Tomida-eki) is an interchange passenger railway station in located in the city of Yokkaichi, Mie, Japan. It is operated jointly by the private railway operators Kintetsu Railway and Sangi Railway.

== Lines ==
Kintetsu-Tomida Station is a station on the Kintetsu Nagoya Line, and is located 31.6 rail kilometers from the terminus of the line at Kintetsu Nagoya Station. It is also a terminus for the Sangi Railway's Sangi Line and is 26.6 kilometers from the opposing terminus of that line at Nishi-Fujiwara Station.

== Station layout ==
The station consists of one side platform and one island platform.

=== Platforms ===
1	■ Kintetsu Nagoya Line	for Yokkaichi, Osaka, Kobe and Kashikojima
2	■ Kintetsu Nagoya Line	for Kuwana and Nagoya
3	■ Sangi Railway Sangi Line	for Hobo, Daian and Nishi-Fujiwara

== History ==
Kintetsu-Tomida Station opened on January 30, 1929, as Nishi Tomida Station (西富田駅, Nishi Tomida-eki), on the Ise Railway. The Ise Railway became the Sangu Express Electric Railway's Ise Line on September 15, 1936. The line was renamed the Nagoya Line on December 7, 1938. After merging with Osaka Electric Kido on March 15, 1941, the line became the Kansai Express Railway's Nagoya Line and the station was renamed Kankyu Tomida Station (関急富田駅, Kankyu Tomida-eki). The Kansai Express was merged with the Nankai Electric Railway on June 1, 1944, to form Kintetsu, with the station becoming Kinki-Nihon Tomida Station (近畿日本富田駅, Kinki Nihon Tomida-eki). The station was renamed to its present name on March 1, 1970. The Sangi Railway began operations at this station on June 25, 1970.

== Passenger statistics ==
In fiscal 2019, the Kintetsu station was used by an average of 9,722 passengers daily (boarding passengers only). During the same period, the Sangi Railway portion of the station was used by 3,549 passengers daily.

== Surrounding area ==
- Yokkaichi City Tomida District Civic Center
- Yokkaichi Tomita Nishi Post Office
- Mie Prefectural Yokkaichi Senior High School
- Mie Prefectural Hokusei High School
- Yokkaichi City Tomida Elementary School

== See also ==
- List of railway stations in Japan
