= Nishi-Fujiwara Station =

Railway station in Inabe, Mie prefecture, Japan

Coordinates: 35°09′50.07″N 136°29′17.71″E

Nishi-Fujiwara Station 西藤原駅
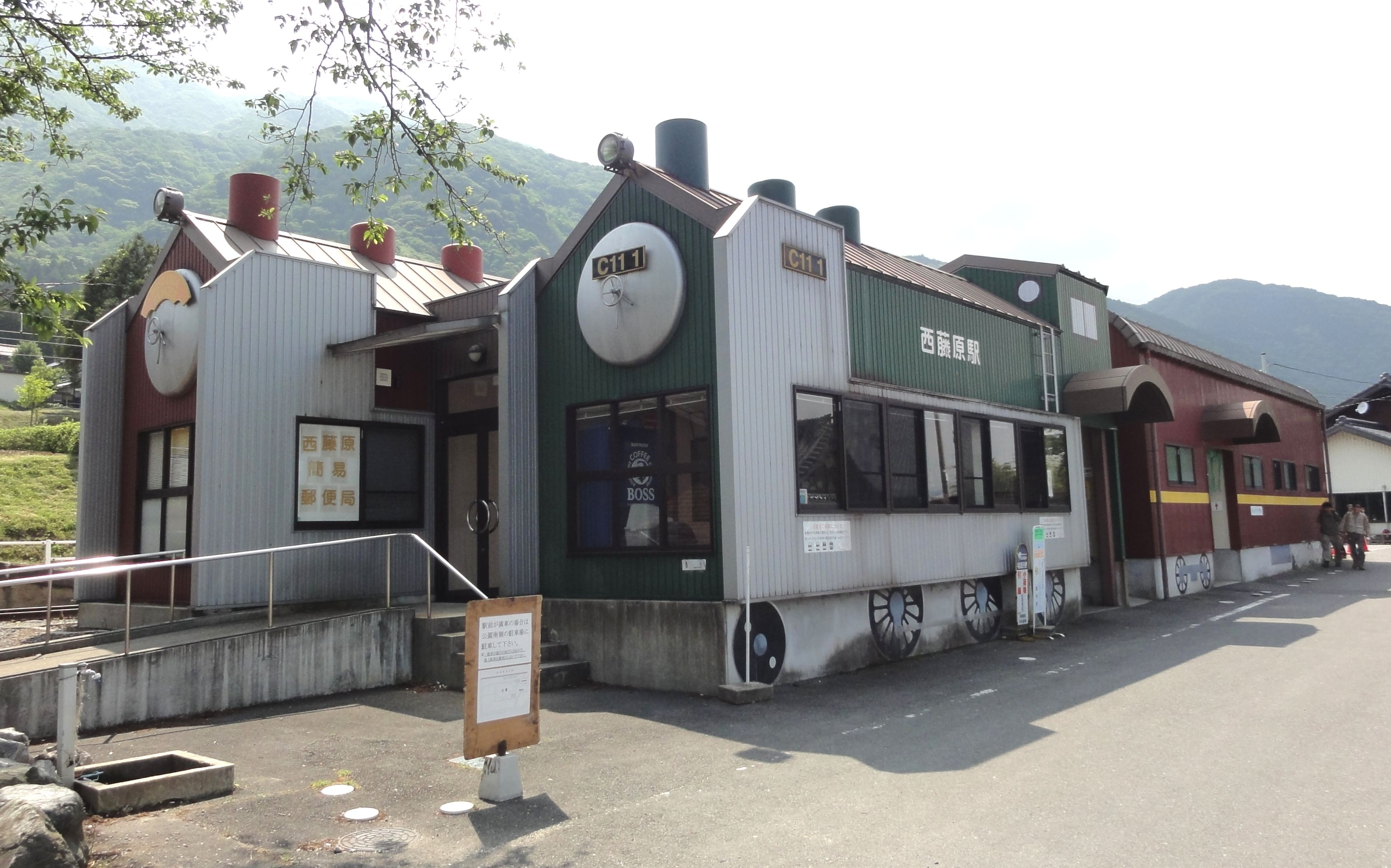
- Nishi-Fujiwara Station

General information
- Location: Fujiwara-cho Ogaito 336, Inabe, Mie （三重県いなべ市藤原町大貝戸336） Japan
- Operator: Sangi Railway
- Line: Sangi Line

History
- Opened: 1931

Passengers
- 2011: 112 daily

Services
Preceding station	Sangi Railway	Following station
Nishi-Nojiri towards Kintetsu-Tomida	Sangi Line	Terminus
Location

Nishi-Fujiwara Station (西藤原駅, Nishi-Fujiwara -eki) is a terminal railway station in Inabe, Mie Prefecture, Japan. It is located 26.5 rail kilometres from the opposing terminus of the Sangi Line at Kintetsu-Tomida Station.

== Lines ==
- Sangi Railway
  - Sangi Line

== Layout ==
Nishi-Fujiwara Station has a single island platform; however, one side of the platform is used to display three old locomotives, and is not in use. The station building is designed to resemble a steam locomotive.

=== Platforms ===
1	■ Sangi Line	For Kintetsu-Tomida

== History ==
Nishi-Fujiwara Station was opened on December 23, 1931. A new station building was completed in July 2002.
