= Sangi Railway =

Railway company in Mie Prefecture, Japan

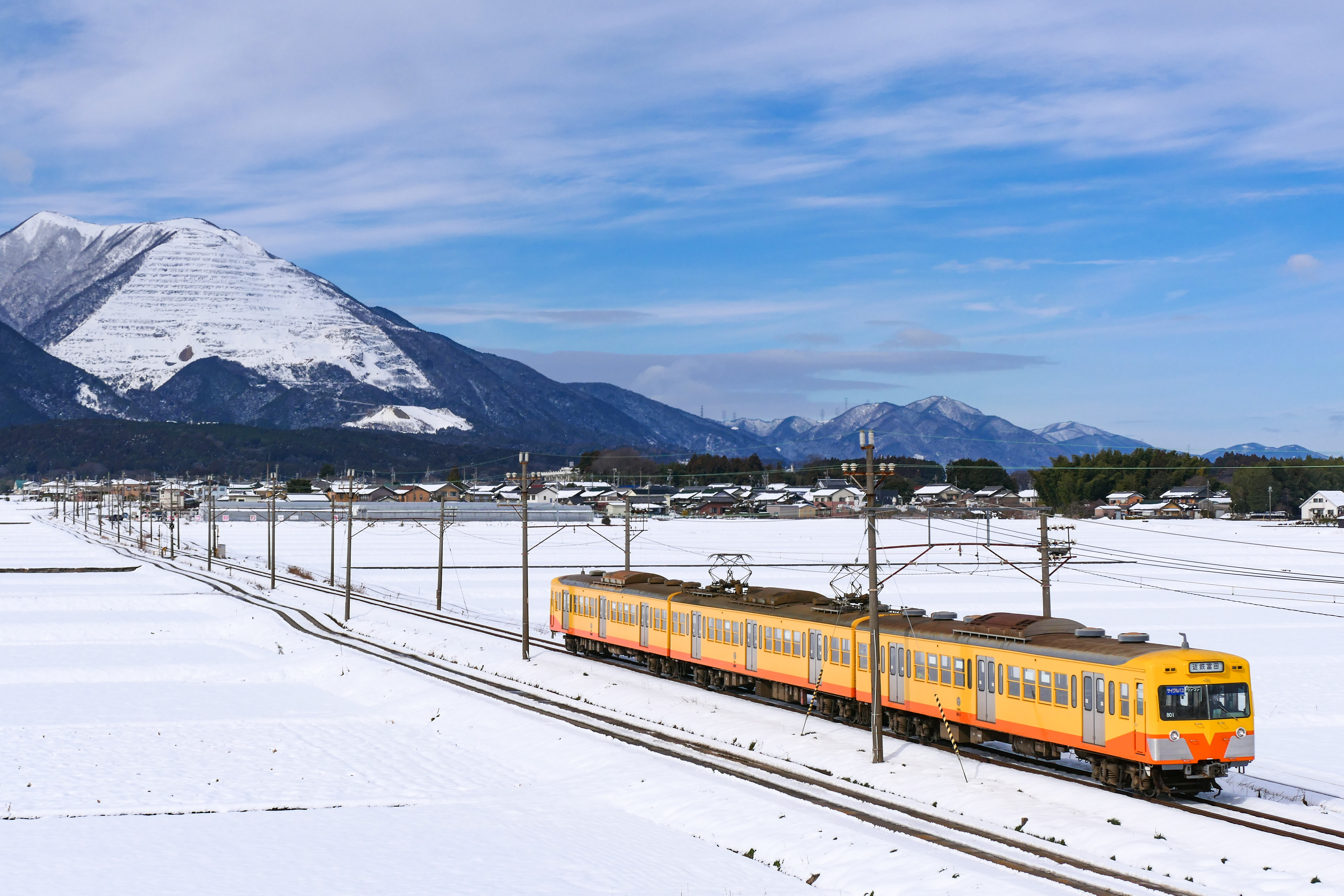
- A Sangi Line 801 series train

Overview
- Main regions: Mie Prefecture, Japan
- Dates of operation: 1928; 98 years ago–

Other
- Website: sangirail.co.jp

Sangi Railway Co., Ltd. (三岐鉄道株式会社, Sangi Tetsudō Kabushiki-gaisha) is a private railway and bus company in Mie Prefecture, Japan. The company was founded in 1928 and its initial line, the Sangi Line, originally functioned as a freight line transporting cement, but later developed into an important commuter railway line for the city of Yokkaichi. The Hokusei Line was transferred from Kintetsu Railway in 2003 when Kintetsu abandoned the line. Whereas the Sangi Line has a track gauge of 1,067 mm (3 ft 6 in), the Hokusei Line is one of only a few 762 mm (2 ft 6 in) narrow gauge lines remaining in the country.

== History ==
The Sangi Line was opened by Onoda Cement in 1931 as a freight-only line to service its cement plant at Nishi-Fujiwara. Passenger services were introduced in 1952. In 1954, the line was electrified at 1,500 V DC, and the company purchased an electric locomotive from Japanese National Railways to haul its cement trains. CTC signalling was commissioned on the line in 1974.

== Rolling stock ==
=== Sangi Line ===
The Sangi Line (三岐線) runs from Kintetsu-Tomida Station in Yokkaichi to Nishi-Fujiwara Station in Inabe.

==== EMUs ====
- 801 series - Former Seibu 701 series trains acquired in 1989
- 101 series - Former Seibu 401 series trains acquired in 1990
- 851 series - Former Seibu 701 series trains acquired in 1995
- 751 series 3-car EMUs - Former Seibu 101 series trains acquired in 2009
- 5000 series - Former JR Central 211 series trains acquired in 2025
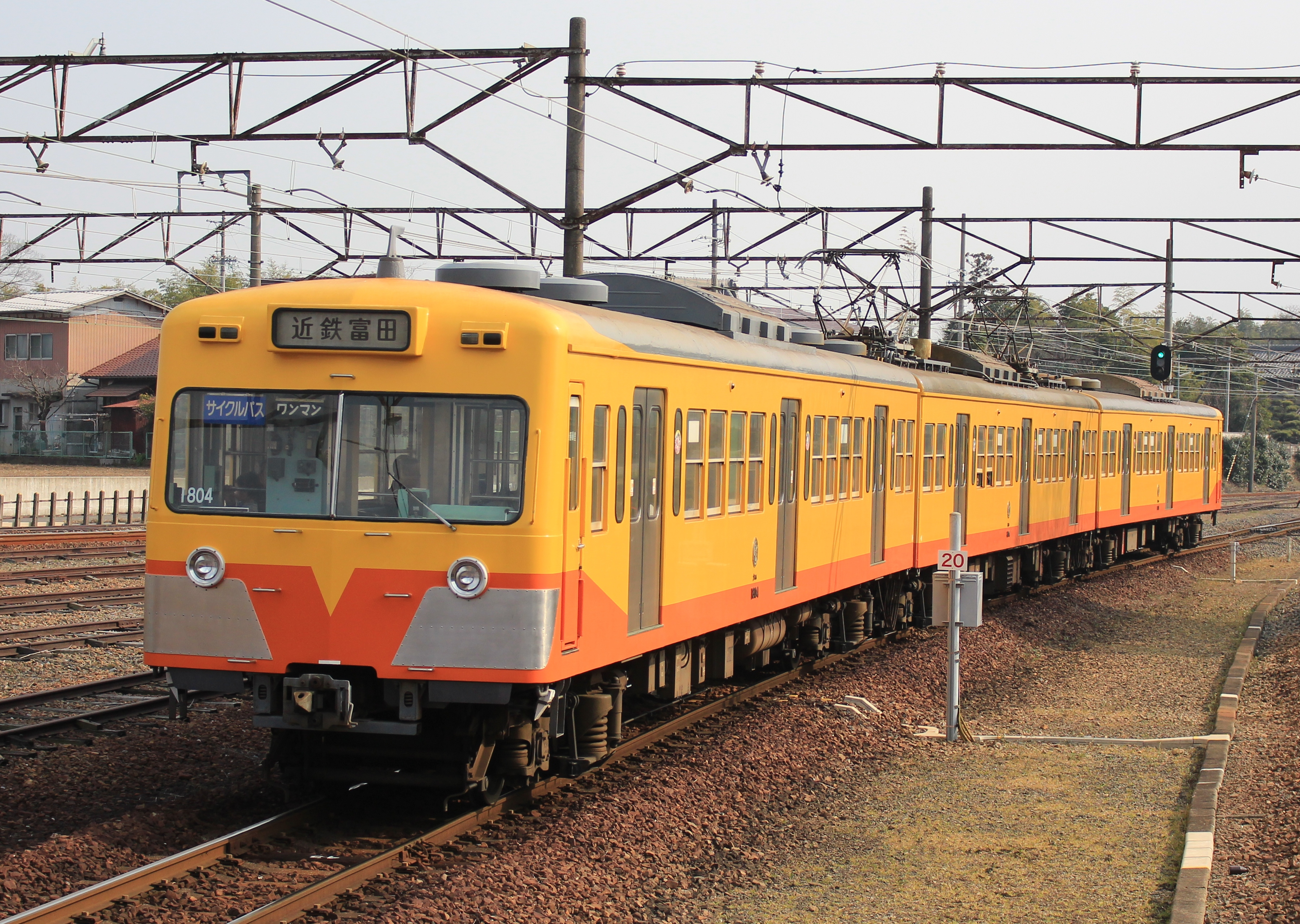
801 series

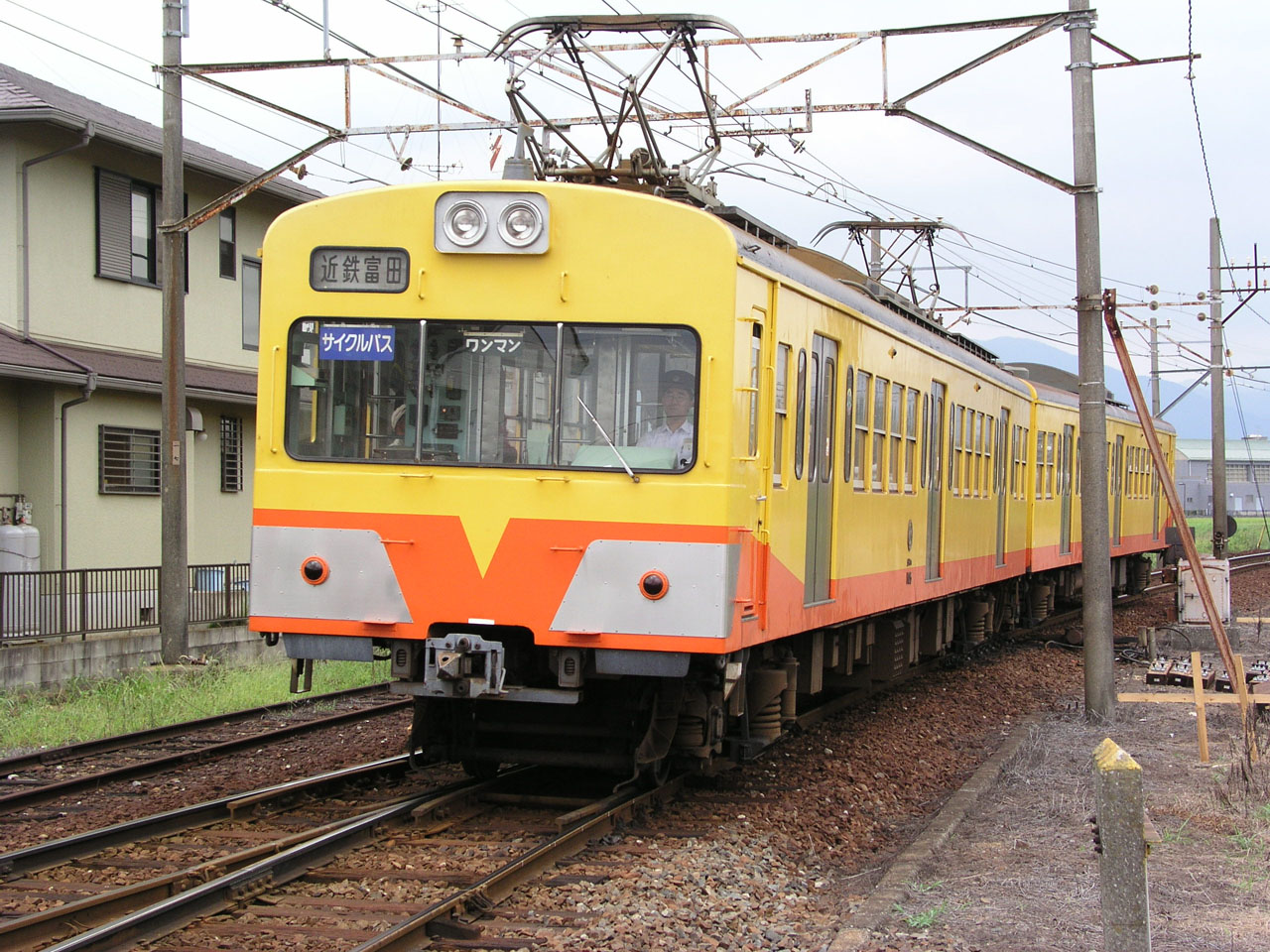
101 series

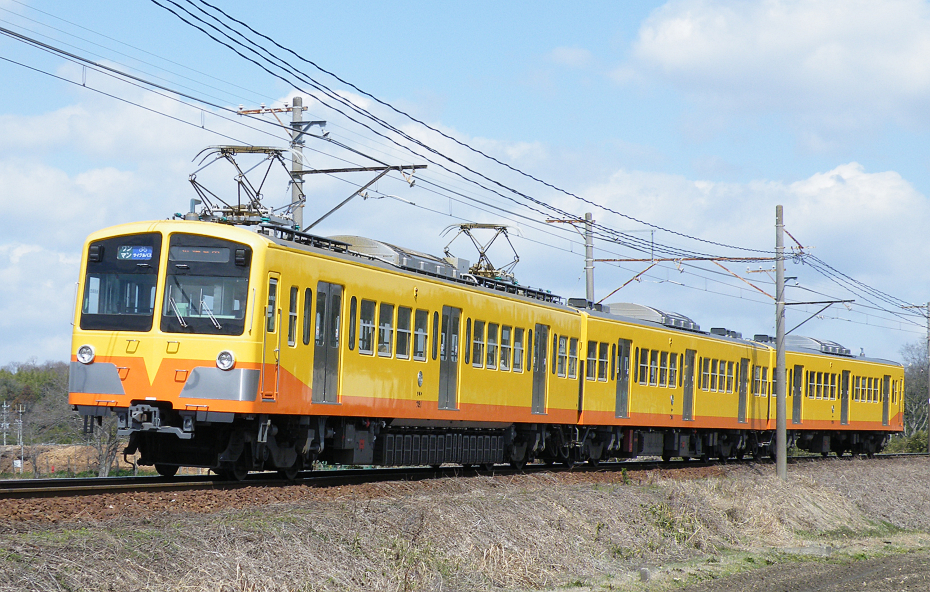
751 series

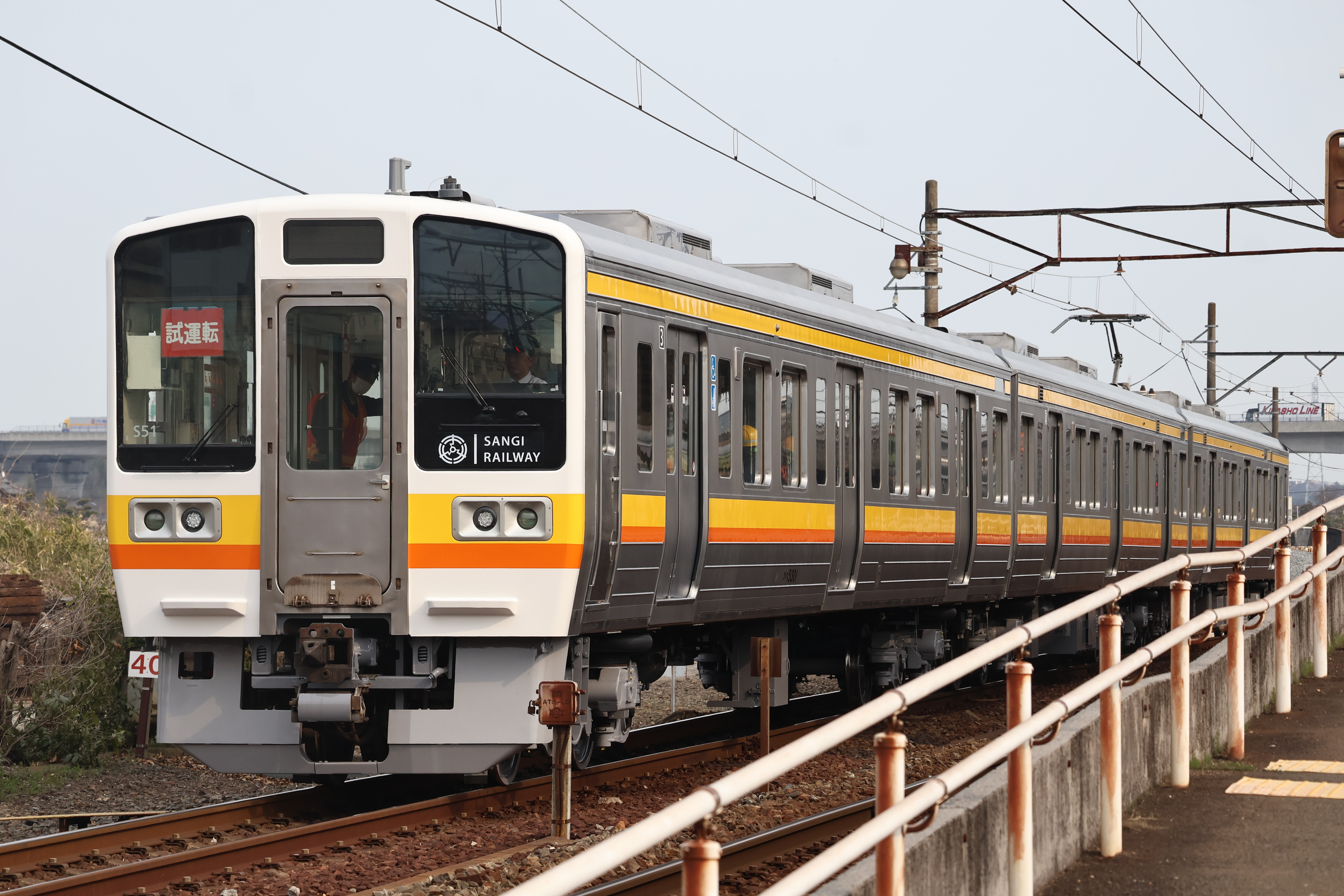
5000 series

==== Electric locomotives ====
- Class ED45: Since 1954 (includes former Tobu Railway locomotives)
- Class ED301: Former Nankai Class ED5201 acquired in 1984
- Class DeKi 200: Former Chichibu Railway Class DeKi 200 acquired in July 2000 and withdrawn in March 2011
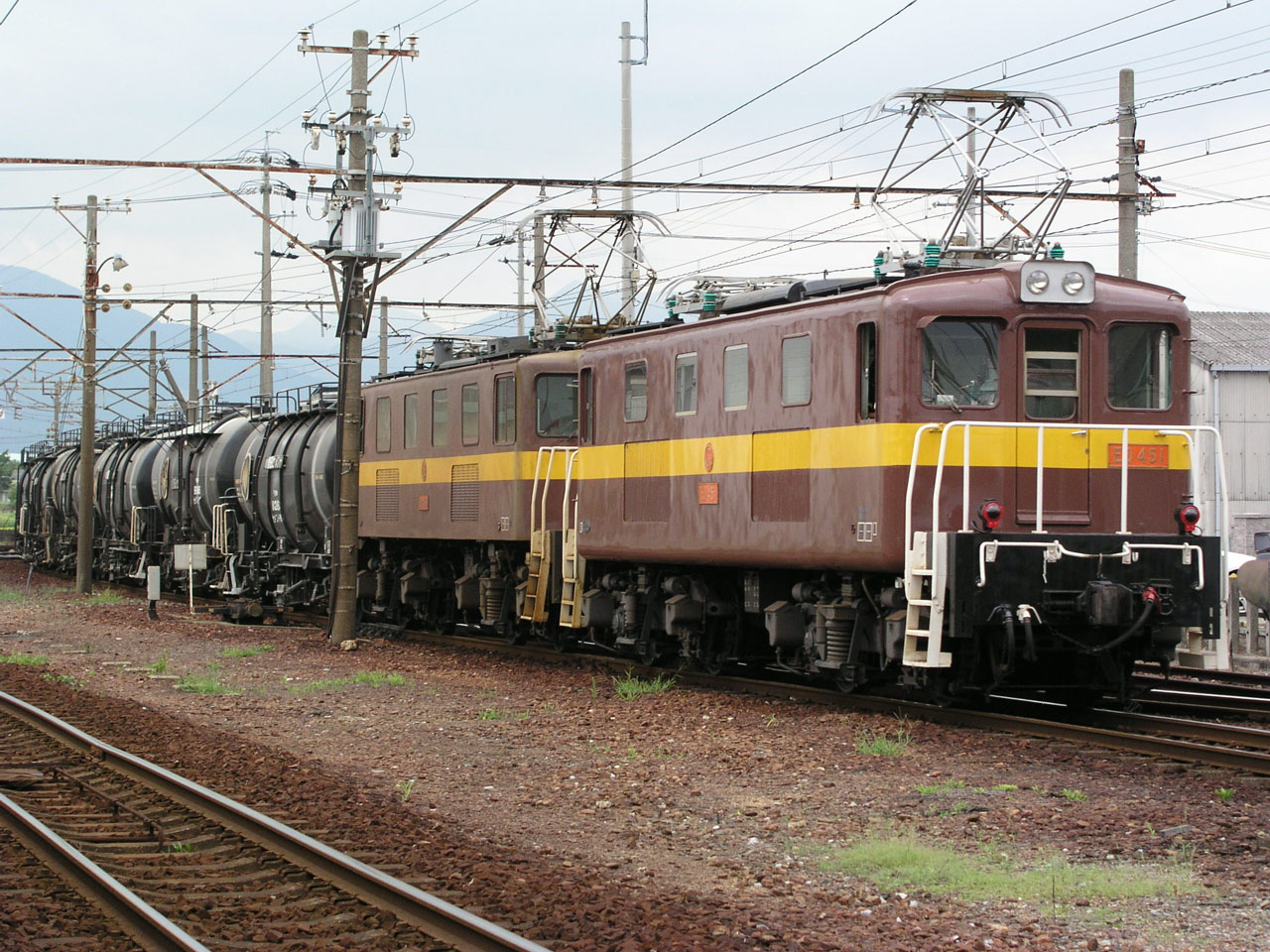
ED45 class ED45 1

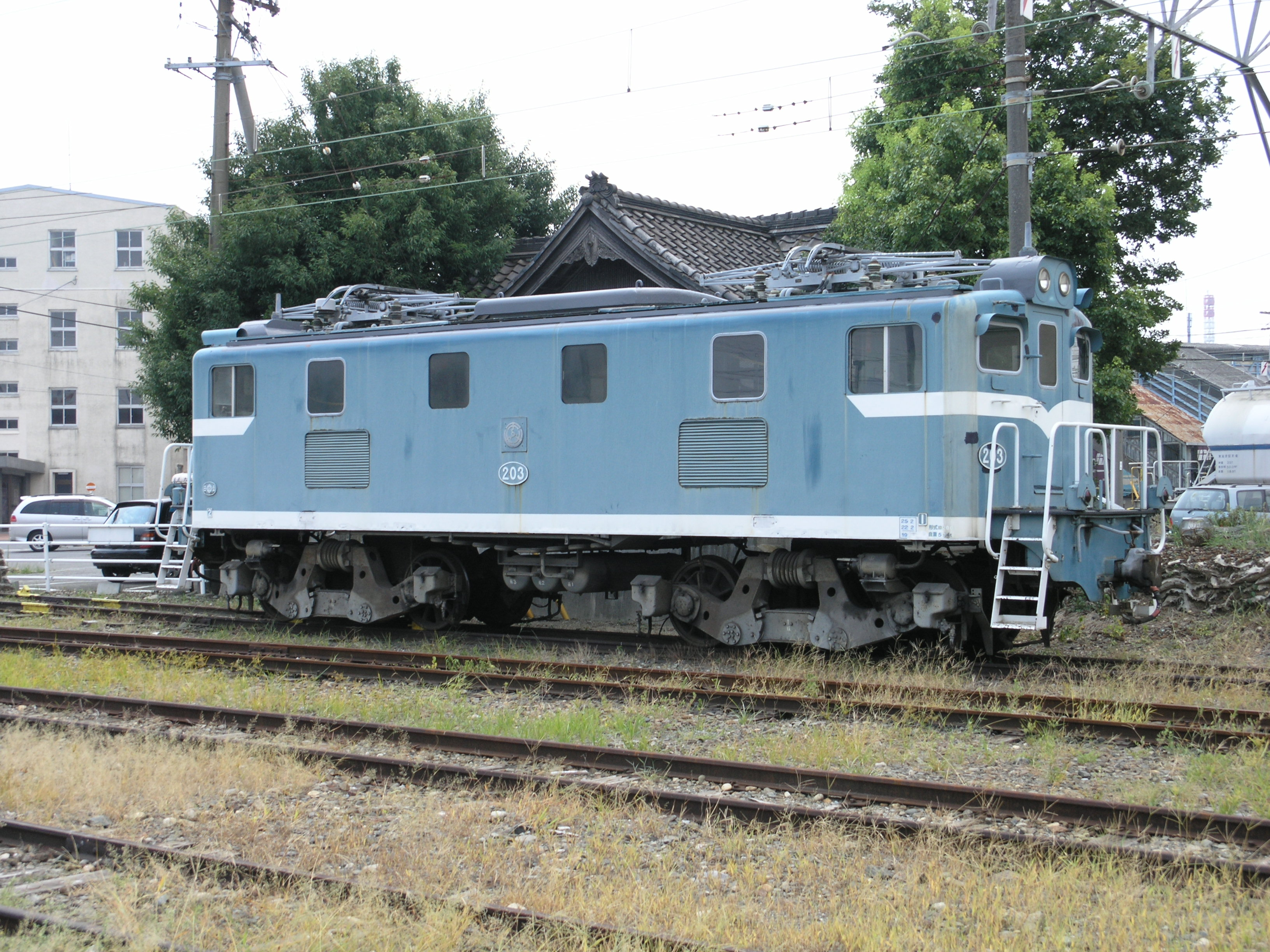
DeKi 203

=== Hokusei Line ===
The Hokusei Line (北勢線) runs from Nishi-Kuwana Station in Kuwana to Ageki Station in Inabe.

==== EMUs ====
- 130 series - Built in 1954
- 200 series - Built in 1959
- 140 series - Built in 1960
- 270 series - Built in 1977
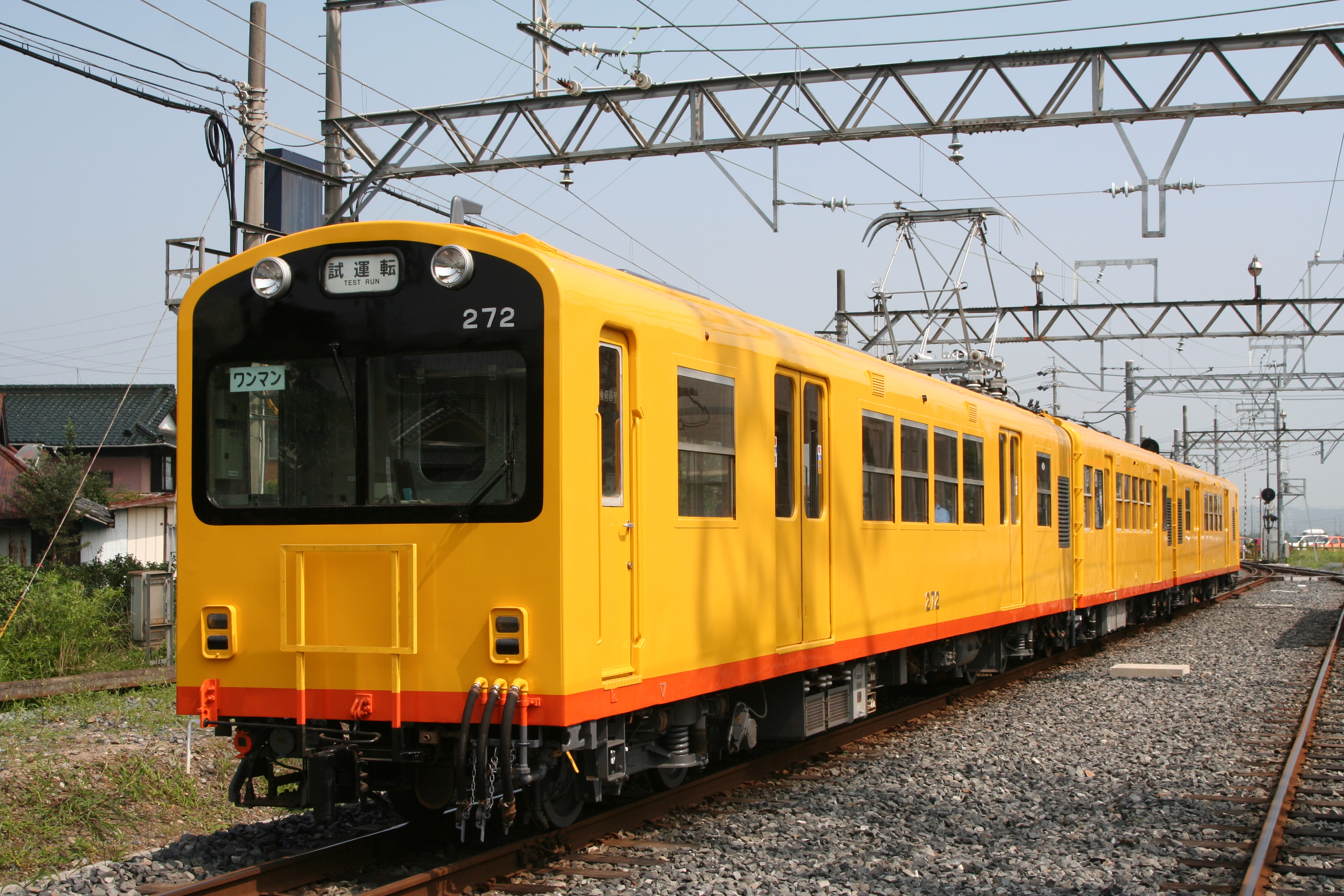
Hokusei Line 270 series train

== See also ==
- List of railway companies in Japan
