= Anoh Station =

Railway station in Tōin, Mie Prefecture, Japan

Anoh Station 穴太駅
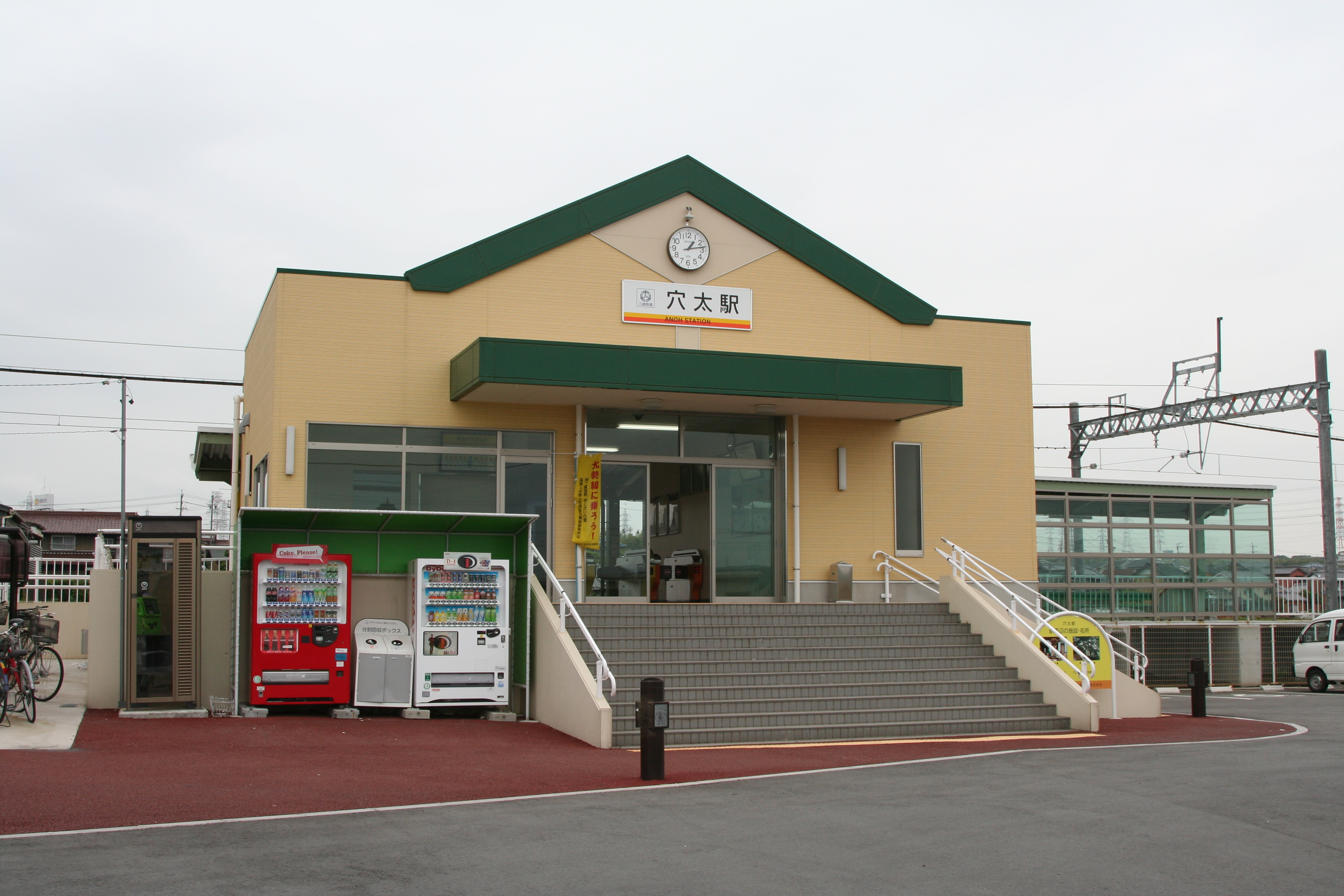
- Anoh Station

General information
- Location: Anō, Tōin-cho, Inabe-gin, Mie-ken 511-0253; Japan
- Coordinates: 35°04′22.27″N 136°36′18.03″E
- Operator: Sangi Railway
- Line: Hokusei Line
- Distance: 8.0 km from Nishi-Kuwana
- Platforms: 1 island platform

History
- Opened: April 5, 1914

Passengers
- FY2019: 347 daily

Services
Preceding station	Sangi Railway	Following station
Nanawa towards Nishi-Kuwana	Hokusei Line	Tōin towards Ageki
Location
- Location within Mie Prefecture Location within Japan

Anoh Station (穴太駅, Anō-eki) is a passenger railway station located in the town of Tōin, Mie Prefecture, Japan, operated by the private railway operator Sangi Railway.

== Lines ==
Anoh Station is served by the Hokusei Line, and is located 8.0 kilometres from the terminus of the line at Nishi-Kuwana Station.

== Layout ==
The station consists of a single island platform, connected to the station building by a level crossing. The station is unattended.

=== Platforms ===
1	■ Hokusei Line	for Nishi-Kuwana
2	■ Sangi Railway Hokusei Line	for Ageki

== History ==
Anoh Station was opened on April 5, 1914, as a station on the Hokusei Railway, which became the Hokusei Electric Railway on June 27, 1934. Through a series of mergers, the line became part of the Kintetsu network by April 1, 1965. The platform was extended on September 29, 1977, by two meters to its present 58 meters. The station building was pulled down on January 20, 1982. The Sangi Railway was spun out of Kintetsu as an independent company on April 1, 2003. A new station building was completed in 2005.

== Passenger statistics ==
In fiscal 2019, the station was used by an average of 347 passengers daily (boarding passengers only).

== Surrounding area ==
- Toin Anou Post Office
- Japan National Route 421

== See also ==
- List of railway stations in Japan
