= Ariyoshi Station =

Railway station in Kuwana, Mie Prefecture, Japan

Ariyoshi Station 在良駅
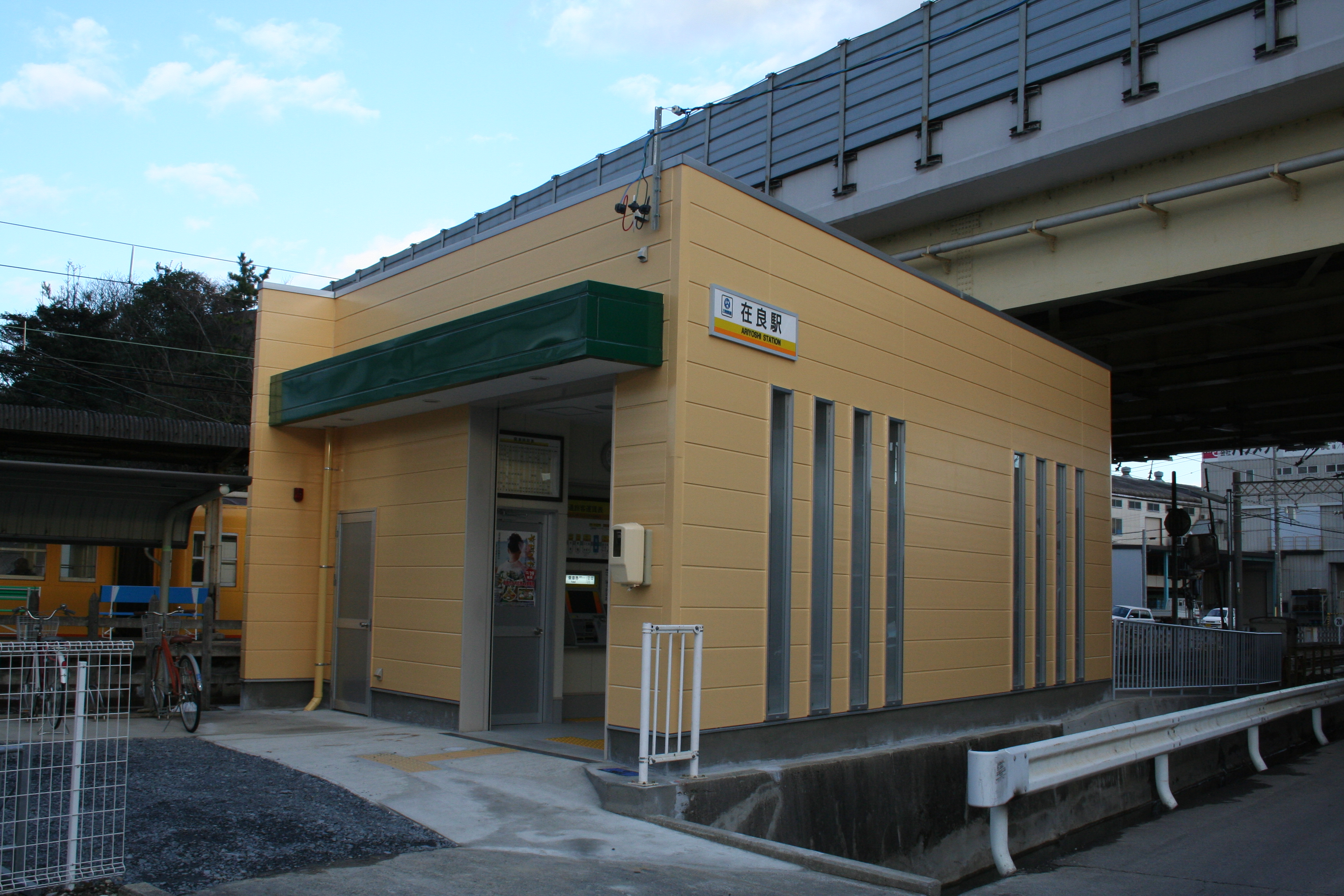
- Ariyoshi Station

General information
- Location: Nukata, Kuwana-shi, Mie-ken 511-0911; Japan
- Coordinates: 35°03′37.9″N 136°38′38.02″E
- Operator: Sangi Railway
- Line: Hokusei Line
- Distance: 4.1 km from Nishi-Kuwana
- Platforms: 1 island platform

History
- Opened: April 5, 1914

Passengers
- FY2019: 166 daily

Services
Preceding station	Sangi Railway	Following station
Rengeji towards Nishi-Kuwana	Hokusei Line	Hoshikawa towards Ageki
Location
- Location within Mie Prefecture Location within Japan

Ariyoshi Station (在良駅, Ariyoshi-eki) is a passenger railway station located in the city of Kuwana, Mie Prefecture, Japan, operated by the private railway operator Sangi Railway.

== Lines ==
Ariyoshi Station is served by the Hokusei Line, and is located 4.1 kilometres from the terminus of the line at Nishi-Kuwana Station.

== Layout ==
The station consists of a single unnumbered island platform connected to the station building by a level crossing. The station is unattended.

=== Platforms ===
North	■ Hokusei Line	for Nishi-Kuwana
South	■ Hokusei Line	for Ageki

== History ==
Ariyoshi Station was opened on April 5, 1914, as a station on the Hokusei Railway, which became the Hokusei Electric Railway on June 27, 1934. Through a series of mergers, the line became part of the Kintetsu network by April 1, 1965, but was spun out as an independent company on April 1, 2003. A new station building was completed on December 27, 2006.

== Passenger statistics ==
In fiscal 2019, the station was used by an average of 166 passengers daily (boarding passengers only).

== Surrounding area ==
- Japan National Route 421

== See also ==
- List of railway stations in Japan
