= Nishibessho Station =

Railway station in Kuwana, Mie Prefecture, Japan

Nishibessho Station 西別所駅
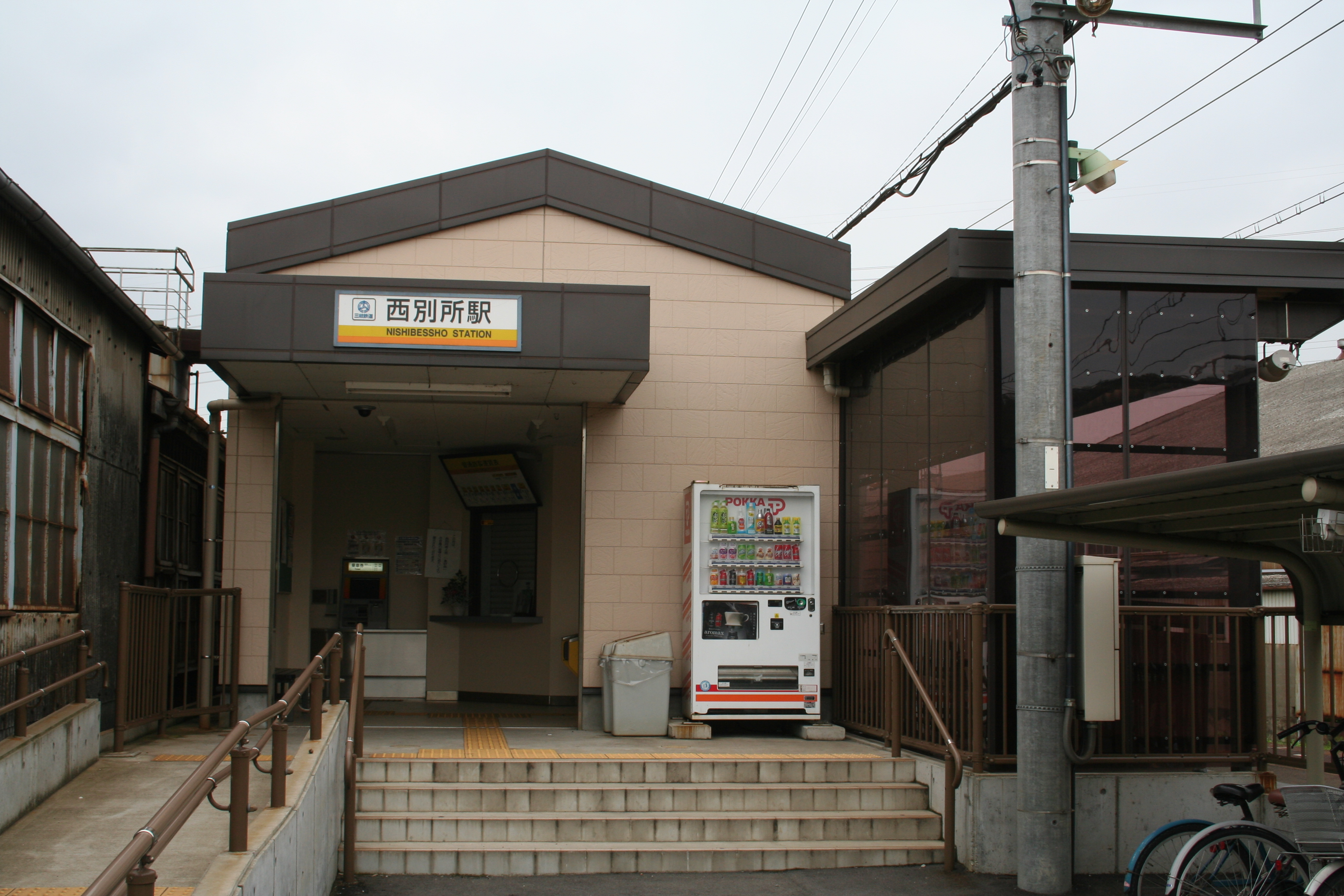
- Nishibessho Station

General information
- Location: Nishibessho, Kuwana-shi, Mie-ken 511-0851; Japan
- Coordinates: 35°03′34.85″N 136°39′57.07″E
- Operator: Sangi Railway
- Line: Hokusei Line
- Distance: 2.0 km from Nishi-Kuwana
- Platforms: 1 side platform

History
- Opened: April 5, 1914

Passengers
- FY2019: 166 daily

Services
Preceding station	Sangi Railway	Following station
Umamichi towards Nishi-Kuwana	Hokusei Line	Rengeji towards Ageki
Location
- Location within Mie Prefecture Location within Japan

Nishibessho Station (西別所駅, Nishibessho-eki) is a passenger railway station located in the city of Kuwana, Mie Prefecture, Japan, operated by the private railway operator Sangi Railway.

== Lines ==
Nishibessho Station is served by the Hokusei Line, and is located 2.0 kilometres from the terminus of the line at Nishi-Kuwana Station.

== Layout ==
The station consists of a single side platform serving bi-directional traffic. The station is unattended.

=== Platforms ===
1	■ Sangi Railway Hokusei Line	For Nishi-Kuwana; For Ageki

== History ==
Nishibessho Station was opened on April 5, 1914 as a station on the Hokusei Railway, which became the Hokusei Electric Railway on June 27, 1934. On April 20, 1977, the platform was extended by an additional five meters. Through a series of mergers, the line became part of the Kintetsu network by April 1, 1965, but was spun out as an independent company on April 1, 2003. A new station building was completed on March 25, 2004.

== Passenger statistics ==
In fiscal 2019, the station was used by an average of 166 passengers daily (boarding passengers only).

== Surrounding area ==
- Kuwana Nishibessho Post Office

== See also ==
- List of railway stations in Japan
