= Tōin Station =

Railway station in Tōin, Mie Prefecture, Japan

Tōin Station 東員駅
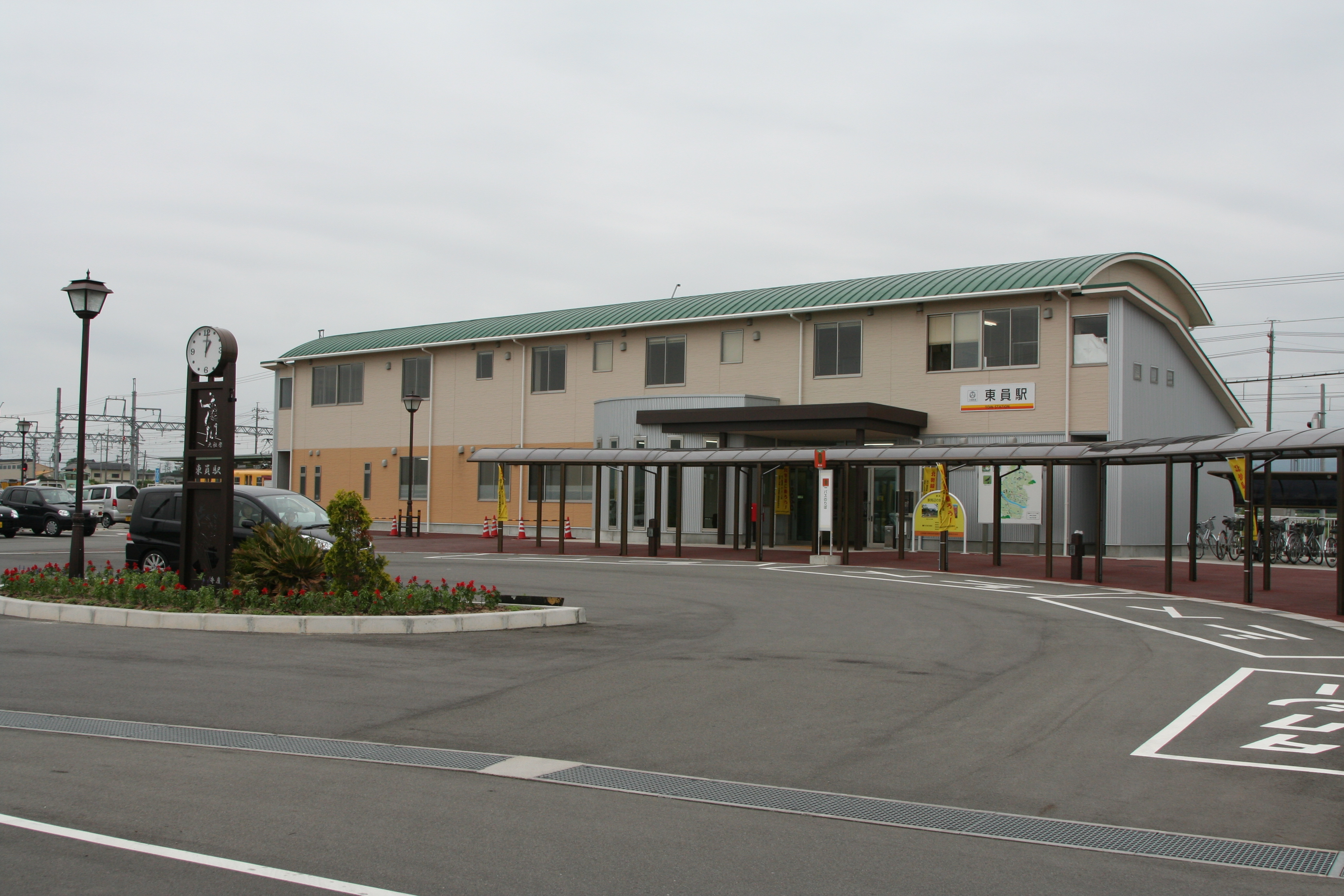
- Tōin Station

General information
- Location: 1953-1 Yamada, Tōin-cho, Inabe-gun, Mie-ken 511-0251; Japan
- Coordinates: 35.0781°N 136.5875°E
- Operator: Sangi Railway
- Line: Hokusei Line
- Distance: 9.7 km from Nishi-Kuwana
- Platforms: 1 island platform

History
- Opened: March 26, 2005

Passengers
- FY2019: 504 daily

Services
| Preceding station | Sangi Railway | Following station |
|---|---|---|
| Anoh towards Nishi-Kuwana | Hokusei Line | Ōizumi towards Ageki |
Location
- Location within Mie Prefecture Location within Japan

Tōin Station (東員駅, Tōin-eki) is a passenger railway station located in the town of Tōin, Mie Prefecture, Japan, operated by the private railway operator Sangi Railway.

== Lines ==
Tōin Station is served by the Hokusei Line, and is located 9.7 kilometres from the terminus of the line at Nishi-Kuwana Station.

== Layout ==
The station consists of a single island platform, connected to the station building by a level crossing.

=== Platforms ===
| 1 | ■ Hokusei Line | for Nishi-Kuwana |
| 2 | ■ Sangi Railway Hokusei Line | for Ageki |

== History ==
The station was opened on March 26, 2005 as a part of a Mie prefectural proposal to increase the convenience of transportation and thus many modern and handicapped-friendly facilities are found at the station.

- June 22, 2005: Automatic ticket gates installed. Fare adjustment machine installed.
- April 13, 2006: Train service at the station is temporarily replaced by bus service for over a month due to a nearby train derailment.
- March 26, 2008: Access road to the station is widened and improved.

== Passenger statistics ==
In fiscal 2019, the station was used by an average of 504 passengers daily (boarding passengers only).

== Surrounding area ==
- Kuwana City Fire Department Toin Branch (in front of the station)
- Toin Town General Government Building
- Toin Town General Cultural Center
- Toin Municipal Kanda Elementary School (10 minutes walk to the east)

== See also ==
- List of railway stations in Japan
