= Sohara Station (Mie) =

Railway station in Inabe, Mie Prefecture, Japan

Sohara Station 楚原駅
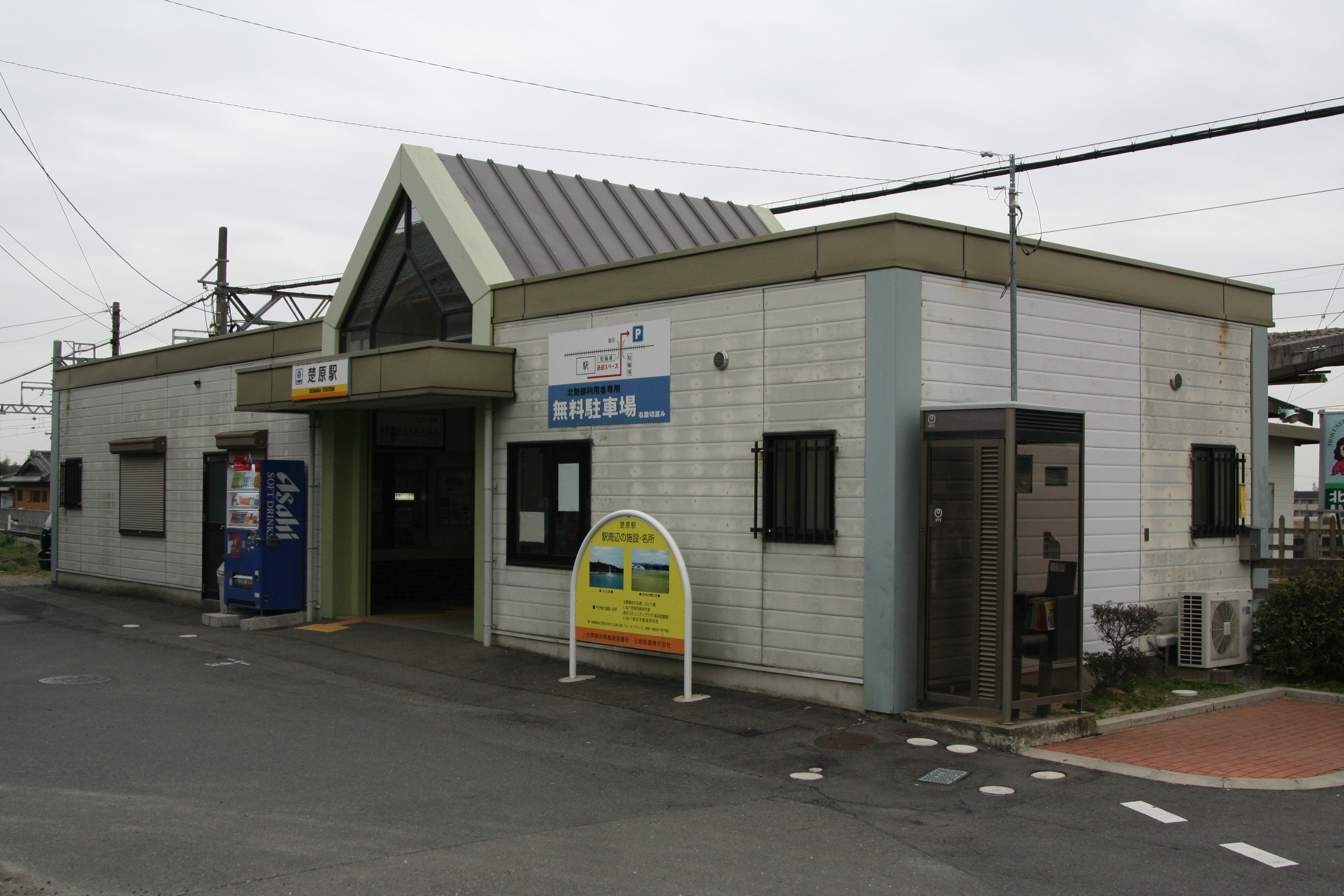
- Sohara Station

General information
- Location: Inabe-cho Sohara 544-1, Inabe-shi, Mie-ken 511-0202; Japan
- Coordinates: 35°06′39.56″N 136°33′37.21″E
- Operator: Sangi Railway
- Line: Hokusei Line
- Distance: 14.4 km from Nishi-Kuwana
- Platforms: 2 side platforms

History
- Opened: April 5, 1914

Passengers
- FY2019: 630 daily

Services
Preceding station	Sangi Railway	Following station
Ōizumi towards Nishi-Kuwana	Hokusei Line	Ohda towards Ageki
Location
- Location within Mie Prefecture Location within Japan

Sohara Station (楚原駅, Sohara-eki) is a passenger railway station located in the city of Inabe, Mie Prefecture, Japan, operated by the private railway operator Sangi Railway.

== Lines ==
Sohara Station is served by the Hokusei Line, and is located 14.4 kilometres from the terminus of the line at Nishi-Kuwana Station.

== Layout ==
The station consists of two unnumbered opposed side platforms connected to the station building by a level crossing.

=== Platforms ===
East	■ Hokusei Line	for Nishi-Kuwana
West	■ Hokusei Line	for Ageki

== History ==
Sohara Station was opened on April 5, 1914, as a station of the Hokusei Railway, which became the Hokusei Electric Railway on June 27, 1934. Through a series of mergers, the line became part of the Kintetsu group on April 1, 1965. A new station building was completed in September 1992. On April 1, 2003, the Sangi Railway was spun out of Kintetsu as an independent company.

== Passenger statistics ==
In fiscal 2019, the station was used by an average of 630 passengers daily (boarding passengers only).

== Surrounding area ==
- Inabe City Hall
- Prefectural Inabe Sogo Gakuen High School

== See also ==
- List of railway stations in Japan
