= Tado (disambiguation) =

Tado may refer to:

- Tado, a village in Togo, Africa
- Tado°, German high-tech company which engages in intelligent climate control
- Tadó, town and municipality in Chocó Department, Colombia
- Tado, a former West African kingdom
- Tado, a village in the Manggrai district of Flores, Indonesia
- Tado, Mie, a town located in Kuwana District, Mie, Japan
- The Lower Tado period of the Japanese Jōmon period
- The Upper Tado period of the Japanese Jōmon period
- Tado, a minion of Garlic Jr. from the Dragon Ball Z series
- Tado (comedian), male comedian from the Philippines
