= Nanawa Station =

Railway station in Kuwana, Mie Prefecture, Japan

Nanawa Station 七和駅
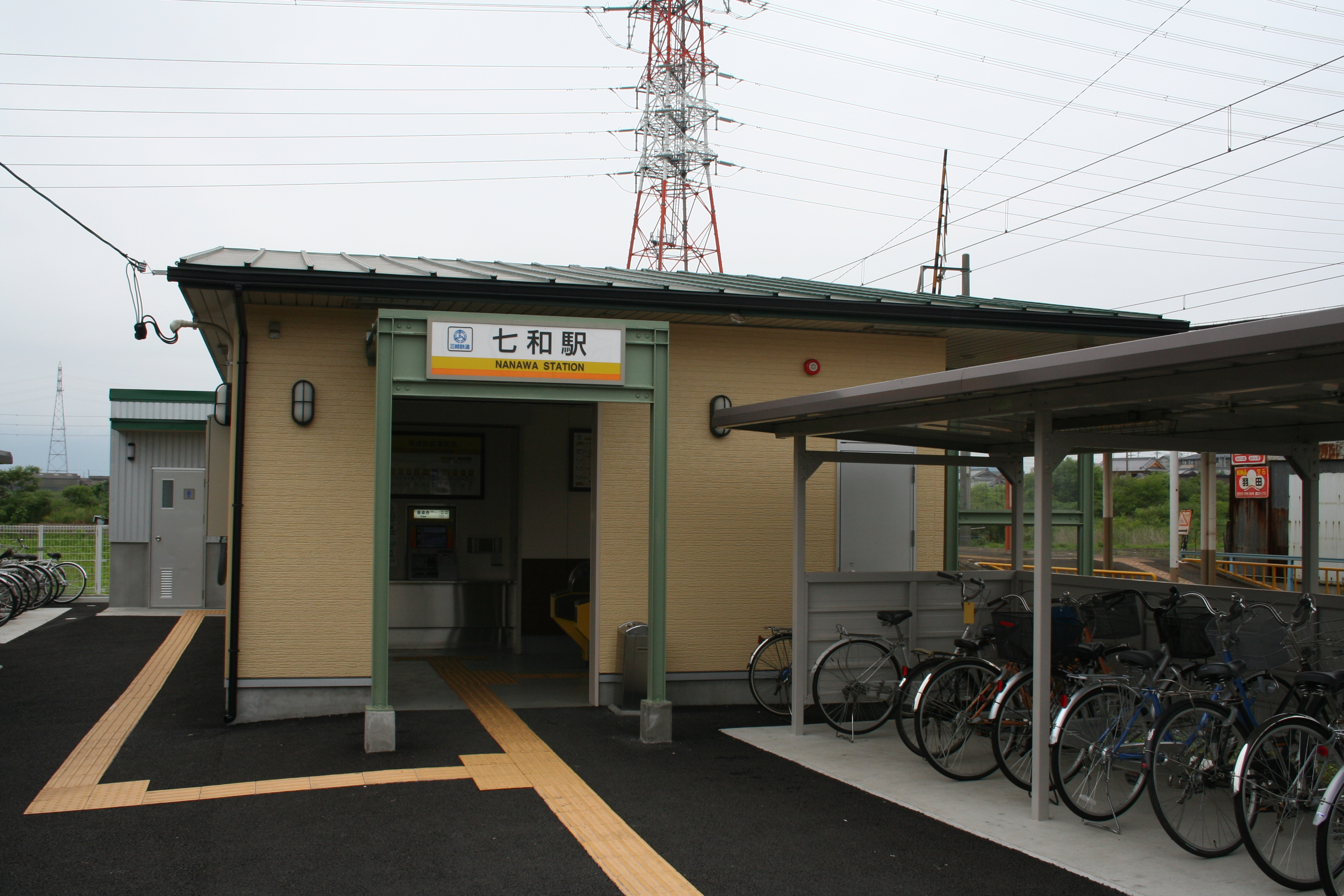
- Nanawa Station

General information
- Location: 607-2 Hagasaki, Kuwana-shi, Mie-ken 511-0944; Japan
- Coordinates: 35°04′7.98″N 136°36′56.63″E
- Operator: Sangi Railway
- Line: Hokusei Line
- Distance: 6.9 km from Nishi-Kuwana
- Platforms: 1 island platform

History
- Opened: April 5, 1914

Passengers
- FY2019: 318 daily

Services
Preceding station	Sangi Railway	Following station
Hoshikawa towards Nishi-Kuwana	Hokusei Line	Anoh towards Ageki
Location
- Location within Mie Prefecture Location within Japan

Nanawa Station (七和駅, Nanawa-eki) is a passenger railway station located in the city of Kuwana, Mie Prefecture, Japan, operated by the private railway operator Sangi Railway.

== Lines ==
Nanawa Station is served by the Hokusei Line, and is located 6.9 kilometres from the terminus of the line at Nishi-Kuwana Station.

== Layout ==
The station consists of a single unnumbered island platform connected to the station building by a level crossing. The station is unattended.

=== Platforms ===
North	■ Hokusei Line	for Nishi-Kuwana
South	■ Hokusei Line	for Ageki

== History ==
Nanawa Station was opened on April 5, 1914 as a station on the Hokusei Railway, which became the Hokusei Electric Railway on June 27, 1934. Through a series of mergers, the line became part of the Kintetsu network by April 1, 1965. The Sangi Railway was spun out of Kintetsu as an independent company on April 1, 2003. A new station building was completed in 2005.

== Passenger statistics ==
In fiscal 2019, the station was used by an average of 318 passengers daily (boarding passengers only).

== Surrounding area ==
- Kuwana City Nanawa District Civic Center
- Mie Prefectural Kuwana Technical High School

== See also ==
- List of railway stations in Japan
