= Ohda Station =

Railway station in Inabe, Mie Prefecture, Japan

Ohda Station 麻生田駅
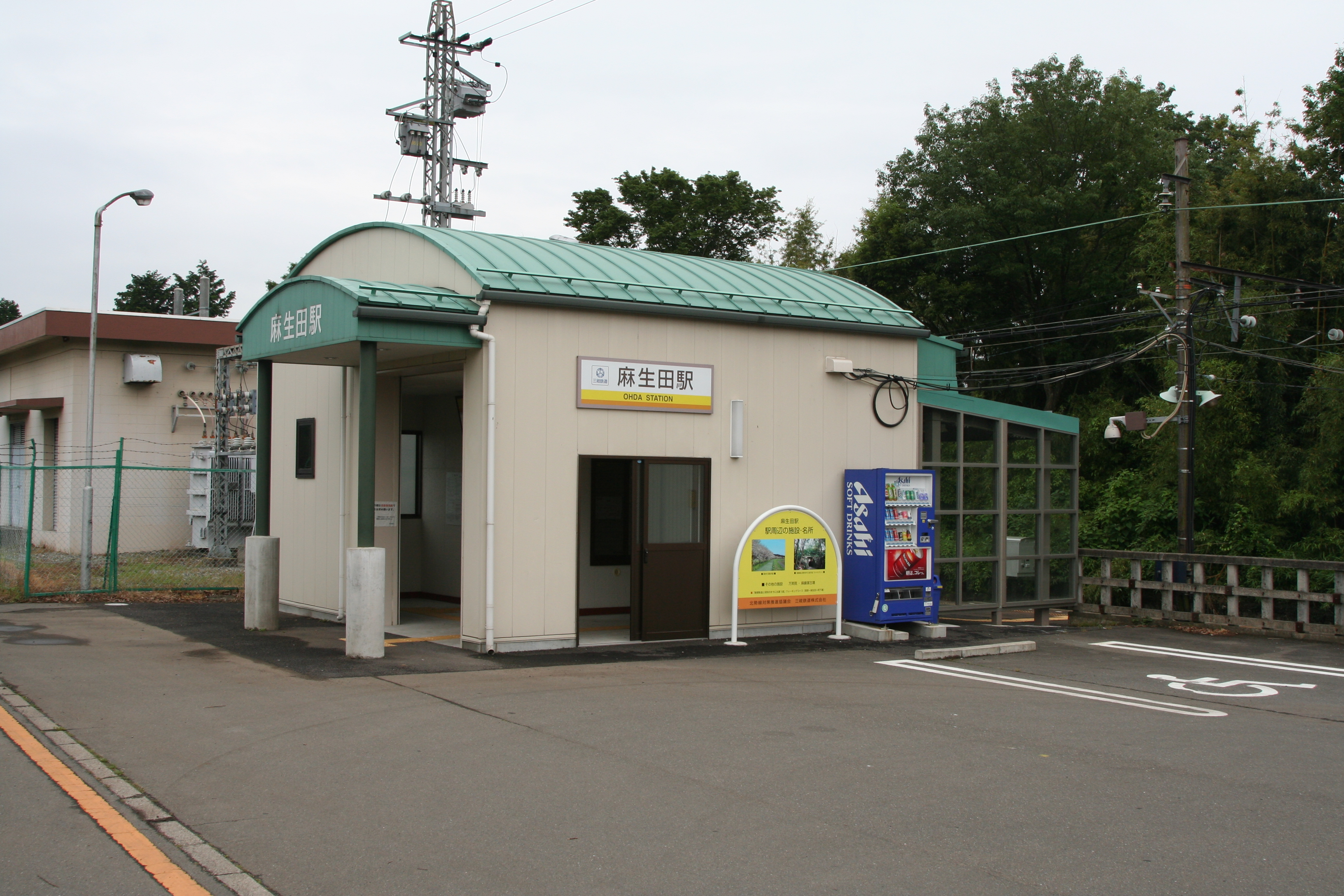
- Ohda Station

General information
- Location: Kitaise-cho Ōda, [nabe-shi, Mie-ken 511-0427; Japan
- Coordinates: 35°08′1.65″N 136°32′8.58″E
- Operator: Sangi Railway
- Line: Hokusei Line
- Distance: 18.1 km from Nishi-Kuwana
- Platforms: 1 side platform

History
- Opened: August 6, 1916

Passengers
- FY2019: 134 daily

Services
Preceding station	Sangi Railway	Following station
Sohara towards Nishi-Kuwana	Hokusei Line	Ageki Terminus
Location
- Location within Mie Prefecture Location within Japan

Ohda Station (麻生田駅, Ōda-eki) is a passenger railway station located in the city of Inabe, Mie Prefecture, Japan, operated by the private railway operator Sangi Railway.

== Lines ==
Ohda Station is served by the Hokusei Line, and is located 18.1 kilometres from the terminus of the line at Nishi-Kuwana Station.

== Layout ==
The station consists of a single side platform serving bidirectional traffic. The station is unattended.

=== Platforms ===
1	■ Sangi Railway Hokusei Line	For Nishi-Kuwana; For Ageki

== History ==
Ohda Station was opened on August 6, 1916 as a station of the Hokusei Railway, which became the Hokusei Electric Railway on June 27, 1934. Through a series of mergers, the line became part of the Kintetsu group on April 1, 1965. On April 15, 1977 the station platform was considerably extended, from 35.9 meters to its present 61.0 meters in length. On April 1, 2003 the Sangi Railway was spun out of Kintetsu as an independent company. A new station building was completed in March 2004.

== Passenger statistics ==
In fiscal 2019, the station was used by an average of 134 passengers daily (boarding passengers only).

== Surrounding area ==
- Hokusei Yamasato Post Office
- Gyojun-ji Temple

== See also ==
- List of railway stations in Japan
