= Hoshikawa Station =

Hoshikawa Station may refer to:

- Hoshikawa Station (Kanagawa) in Kanagawa, Japan connected with the Sagami Railway Main Line
- Hoshikawa Station (Mie) in Mie, Japan connected with the Sangi Railway Hokusei Line
