= Ōizumi Station =

Ōizumi Station (大泉駅) is the name of three train stations in Japan:

- Ōizumi Station (Fukushima)
- Ōizumi Station (Mie)
- Ōizumi Station (Toyama)
