= Hoshikawa =

Hoshikawa (written: 星川 lit. "star river") is a Japanese surname. Notable people with the surname include:

- Naohiro Hoshikawa (星川 直宏, born 1974), Japanese professional wrestler
- Naomi Hoshikawa (星川 直美, born 1969), Japanese cross-country skier

== Fictional characters ==
- Gaku Hoshikawa (星川 学), a character in the tokusatsu television series Chikyuu Sentai Fiveman
- Hana Hoshikawa (星川 花), a character in the anime series Reideen
- Hikayu Hoshikawa (星河 ひかゆ), a character in the anime series Re:Creators
- Hotaru Hoshikawa (星川 ほたる), a character in the manga series New Game!
- Mafuyu Hoshikawa (星川 麻冬), a character in the manga series Blend S
- Meika Hoshikawa (星川 冥香), a character in the video game Bullet Girls
- Seira Hoshikawa (星河 せいら), a character in the anime series Day Break Illusion
- Seiya Hoshikawa (星川 聖夜), a character in the manga series My Girlfriend is Shobitch
- Subaru Hoshikawa (星河 スバル), protagonist of the video game Shooting Star Rockman
- Toshiki Hoshikawa (星川 敏樹), a character in the manga series Goodnight Punpun

== See also ==
- 7429 Hoshikawa, a main-belt asteroid
- Hoshikawa Station (disambiguation), multiple railway stations in Japan
