= Tōin, Mie =

Tōin 東員町
- Town
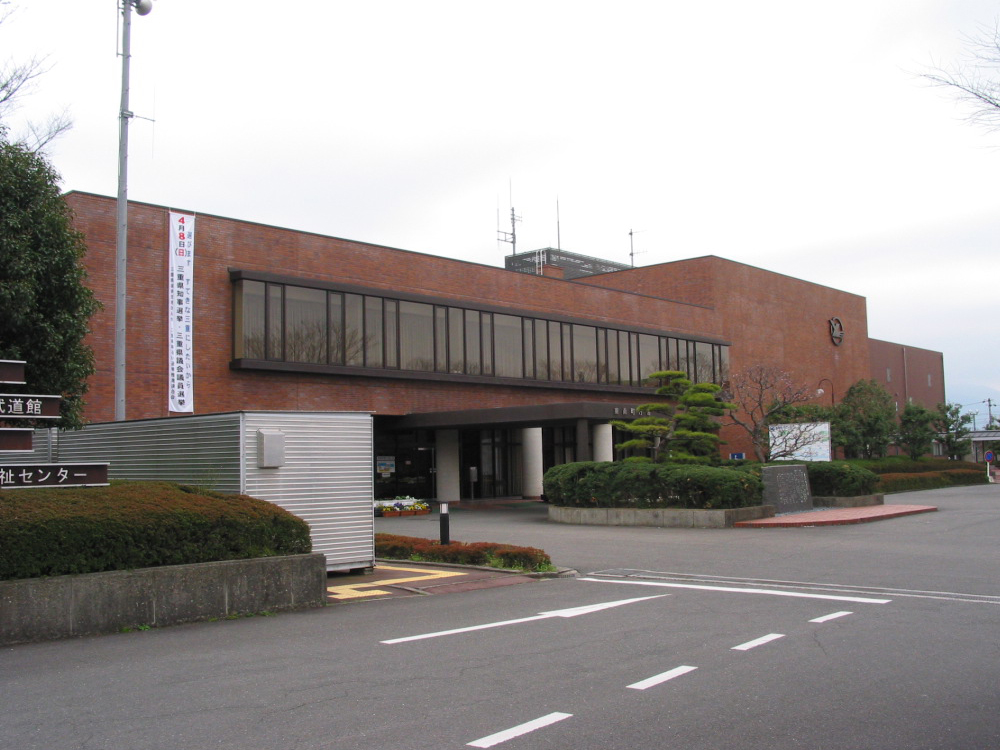
- Tōin Town Office

- Flag Seal

- Location of Tōin in Mie Prefecture

- Coordinates: 35°4′N 136°36′E
- Country: Japan
- Region: Kansai
- Prefecture: Mie
- District: Inabe

Area
  - Total: 22.66 km^{2} (8.75 sq mi)

Population (August 2021)
  - Total: 25,887
  - Density: 1,142/km^{2} (2,959/sq mi)
- Time zone: UTC+9 (Japan Standard Time)
- Symbols
  - Tree: Prunus mume
  - Flower: Paeonia lactiflora
  - Bird: Eurasian skylark
- Phone number: 0594-86-2800
- Address: 1600 Yamada, Tōin-chō, Inabe-gun, Mie-ken 511-0295
- Website: Official website

Tōin (東員町, Tōin-chō) is a town located in Inabe District, Mie Prefecture, Japan. As of 31 May 2021, the town had an estimated population of 25,887 in 10027 households and a population density of 1100 persons per km^{2}. The total area of the town was 22.66 square kilometres (8.75 sq mi).

== Geography ==
Tōin is located near the far northeastern tip of the Kii Peninsula. The Inabe River flows eastward in the center of the town, and as it goes to the north it forms a gentle hill with an elevation of about 100 meters. The city with an administrative area is approximately five kilometers east–west by 7.3 kilometers north–south.

=== Neighboring municipalities ===
Mie Prefecture

- Inabe
- Kuwana
- Yokkaichi

== Climate ==
Tōin has a humid subtropical climate (Köppen Cfa) characterized by warm summers and cool winters with light to no snowfall.

== Demographics ==
Per Japanese census data, the population of Tōin has remained steady over the past 40 years.

Historical population
Year	Pop.	±%
1950	9,016	—
1960	8,255	−8.4%
1970	9,562	+15.8%
1980	15,538	+62.5%
1990	25,447	+63.8%
2000	26,304	+3.4%
2010	25,662	−2.4%

== History ==
The area of Tōin is part of ancient Ise Province and was largely administered by Kuwana Domain during the Edo period. With the creation of the modern municipalities system on April 1, 1889, the villages of Daicho, Inabe and Kanda were established within Inabe District, Mie. These villages merged to form the village of Tōin on November 3, 1954. Tōin was elevated to town status on April 1, 1967.

== Government ==
Tōin has a mayor-council form of government with a directly elected mayor and a unicameral town council of 14 members. Tōin, collectively with the city of Inabe, contributes two members to the Mie Prefectural Assembly. In terms of national politics, the town is part of Mie 4rd

== Education ==
Tōin has six public elementary schools and two public middle schools operated by the town government. The town does not have a high school.

== Transportation ==
=== Railway ===
Sangi Railway – Hokusei Line

- Anoh – Tōin

=== Highway ===
- National Route 365
- National Route 421

== Notable people ==
- Tomoki Hoshino, professional baseball player
- Matsumoto Kōshirō VII, kabuki actor
