= Ōizumi Station (Mie) =

Railway station in Inabe, Mie Prefecture, Japan

Ōizumi Station 大泉駅
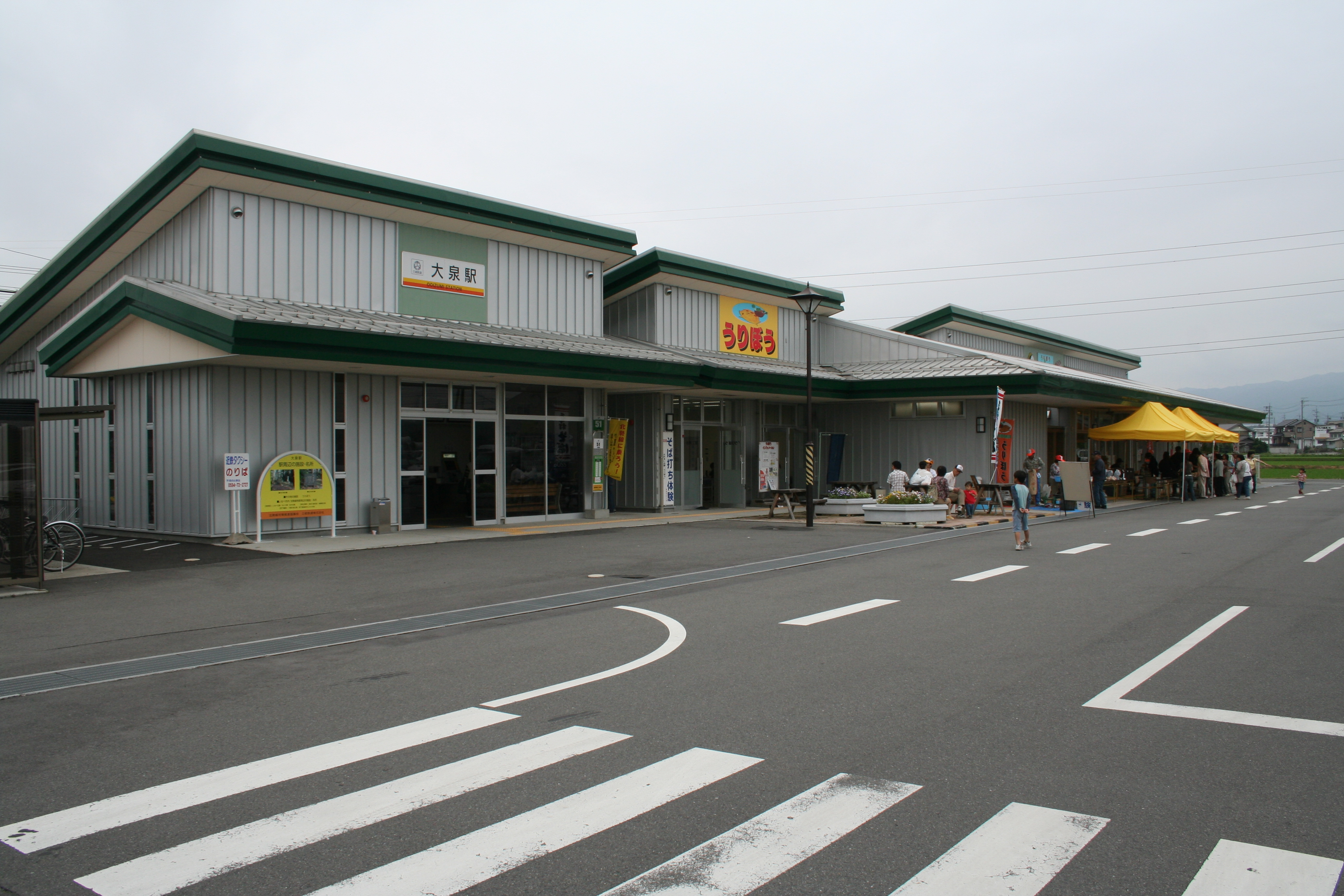
- Ōizumi Station

General information
- Location: Inben-cho Ōizumi 2516, Inabe-shi, Mie-ken 511-0224; Japan
- Coordinates: 35°05′42.14″N 136°34′12.68″E
- Operator: Sangi Railway
- Line: Hokusei Line
- Distance: 12.4 km from Nishi-Kuwana
- Platforms: 1 island platform

History
- Opened: April 1, 2004

Passengers
- FY2019: 270 daily

Services
Preceding station	Sangi Railway	Following station
Tōin towards Nishi-Kuwana	Hokusei Line	Sohara towards Ageki
Location
- Location within Mie Prefecture Location within Japan

Ōizumi Station (大泉駅, Ōizumi-eki) is a passenger railway station located in the city of Inabe, Mie Prefecture, Japan, operated by the private railway operator Sangi Railway.

== Lines ==
Ōizumi Station is served by the Hokusei Line, and is located 12.4 kilometres from the terminus of the line at Nishi-Kuwana Station.

== Layout ==
The station consists of a single island platform connected to the station building by a level crossing.

=== Platforms ===
1	■ Hokusei Line	for Nishi-Kuwana
2	■ Hokusei Line	for Ageki

== History ==
Ōizumi Station was opened on April 1, 2004 as a part of a Mie prefectural proposal to increase the convenience of transportation, and thus many modern and handicapped-friendly facilities are found at the station.

== Passenger statistics ==
In fiscal 2019, the station was used by an average of 270 passengers daily (boarding passengers only).

== Surrounding area ==
- Inabe Municipal Azuma Elementary School

== See also ==
- List of railway stations in Japan
