= Umamichi Station =

Railway station in Kuwana, Mie Prefecture, Japan

Umamichi Station 馬道駅
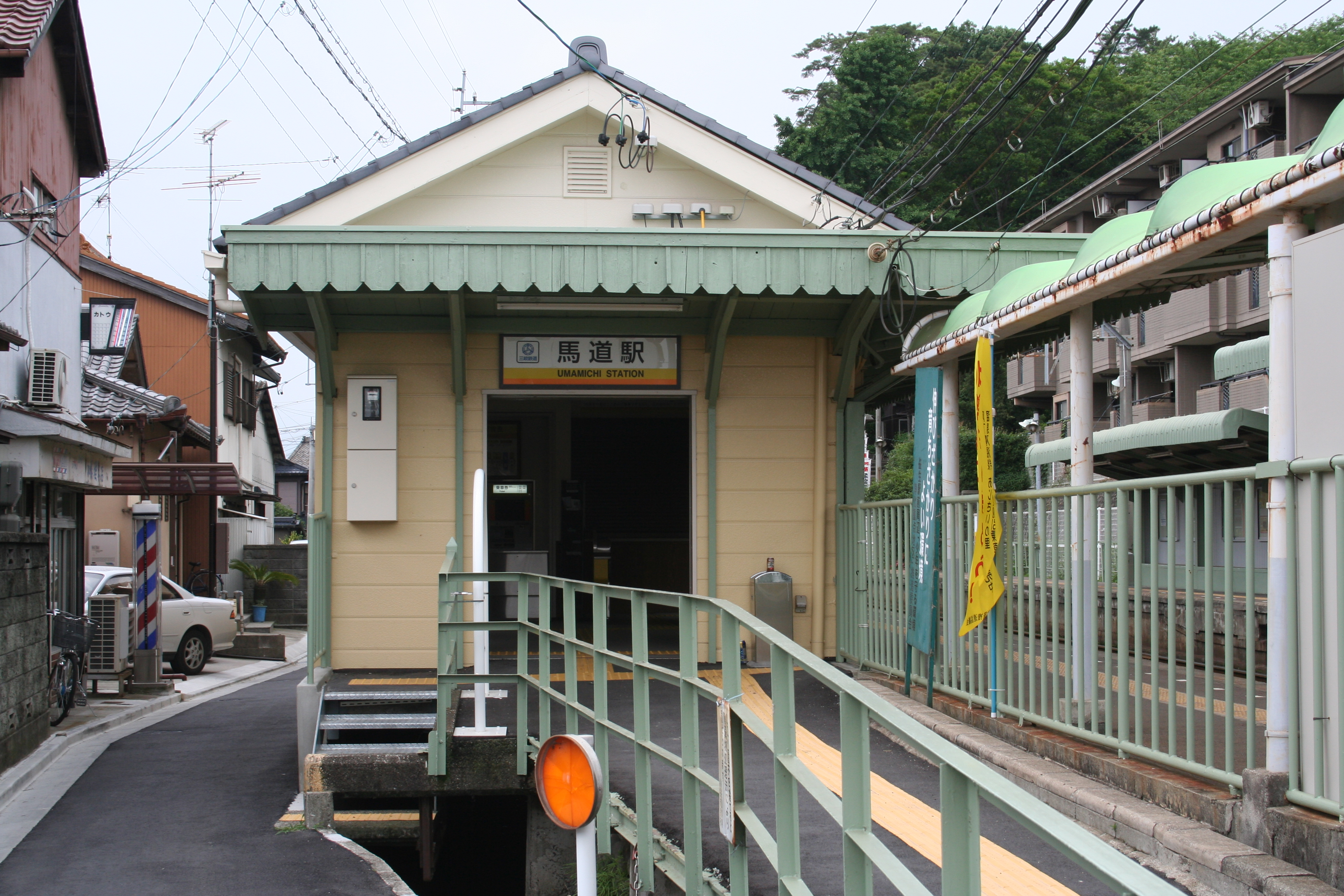
- Umamichi Station

General information
- Location: Hongan-ji, Kuwana-shi, Mie-ken 511-0835; Japan
- Coordinates: 35°3′38.3″N 136°40′36″E
- Operator: Sangi Railway
- Line: Hokusei Line
- Distance: 1.1 km from Nishi-Kuwana
- Platforms: 2 side platforms

History
- Opened: April 5, 1914

Passengers
- FY2019: 250 daily

Services
Preceding station	Sangi Railway	Following station
Nishi-Kuwana Terminus	Hokusei Line	Nishibessho towards Ageki
Location
- Location within Mie Prefecture Location within Japan

Umamichi Station (馬道駅, Umamichi-eki) is a passenger railway station located in the city of Kuwana, Mie Prefecture, Japan, operated by the private railway operator Sangi Railway.

== Lines ==
Umamichi Station is served by the Hokusei Line, and is located 1.1 kilometres from the terminus of the line at Nishi-Kuwana Station.

== Layout ==
The station consists of two unnumbered opposed side platforms connected by a level crossing. The station is unattended.

=== Platforms ===
North	■ Hokusei Line	for Nishi-Kuwana
South	■ Hokusei Line	for Ageki

== History ==
Umamichi Station was opened on April 5, 1914 as a station on the Hokusei Railway, which became the Hokusei Electric Railway on June 27, 1934. Through a series of mergers, the line became part of the Kintetsu network by April 1, 1965, but was spun out as an independent company on April 1, 2003.

== Passenger statistics ==
In fiscal 2019, the station was used by an average of 250 passengers daily (boarding passengers only).

== Surrounding area ==
- Kuwana High School
- Kuwana Umamichi Post Office

== See also ==
- List of railway stations in Japan
