= Hoshikawa Station (Mie) =

Railway station in Kuwana, Mie Prefecture, Japan

Hoshikawa Station 星川駅
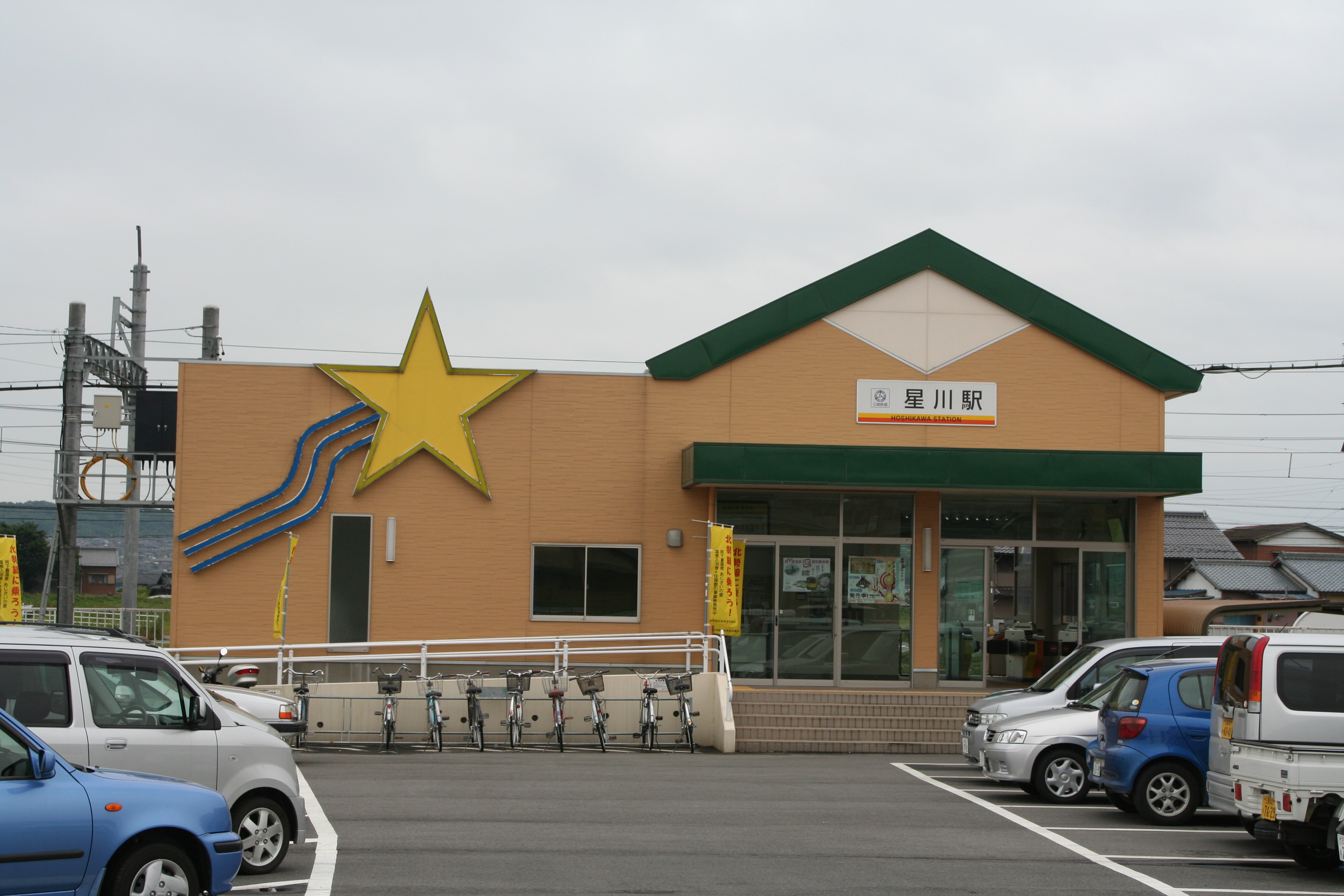
- Hoshikawa Station

General information
- Location: 902-2 Hoshikawa, Kuwana-shi, Mie-ken 511-0912; Japan
- Coordinates: 35°03′37.9″N 136°38′38.02″E
- Operator: Sangi Railway
- Line: Hokusei Line
- Distance: 5.5 km from Nishi-Kuwana
- Platforms: 1 side platform

History
- Opened: April 5, 1914

Passengers
- FY2019: 797 daily

Services
Preceding station	Sangi Railway	Following station
Ariyoshi towards Nishi-Kuwana	Hokusei Line	Nanawa towards Ageki
Location
- Location within Mie Prefecture Location within Japan

Hoshikawa Station (星川駅, Hoshikawa-eki) is a passenger railway station located in the city of Kuwana, Mie Prefecture, Japan, operated by the private railway operator Sangi Railway.

== Lines ==
Hoshikawa Station is served by the Hokusei Line, and is located 5.5 kilometres from the terminus of the line at Nishi-Kuwana Station.

== Layout ==
The station consists of a single side platform serving bi-directional traffic. The station is unattended.

=== Platforms ===
1	■ Sangi Railway Hokusei Line	For Nishi-Kuwana; For Ageki

== History ==
Hoshikawa Station was opened on April 5, 1914 as a station on the Hokusei Railway, but was closed on May 10, 1916. The station was reopened on September 8, 1927 for freight operations only, and passenger operations were resumed on November 1, 1932. The Hokusei Railway became the Hokusei Electric Railway on June 27, 1934. The station was again closed on July 1, 1944, and not reopened until February 1, 1964. Through a series of mergers, the line became part of the Kintetsu network by April 1, 1965. The station was closed for a third time on May 15, 1969. The Sangi Railway was spun out of Kintetsu as an independent company on April 1, 2003. Hoshikawa Station was reopened again on March 26, 2005 with a new station building, located some 500 meters towards Ageki from its original location.

== Passenger statistics ==
In fiscal 2019, the station was used by an average of 797 passengers daily (boarding passengers only).

== Surrounding area ==
- Tsuda Gakuen Junior and Senior High School

== See also ==
- List of railway stations in Japan
