= Kuwana District =

District in Mie prefecture, Japan

Location of Kuwana District in Mie prefecture

Kuwana (桑名郡, Kuwana-gun) is a district located in Mie Prefecture, Japan.

The district underwent a merger in December 2004. According to the 2003 population estimates, the district has an estimated population of 7,091 and a density of 451 persons per km^{2}. The total area is 15.72 km^{2}.

== Towns and villages ==
- Kisosaki

== Mergers ==
- On December 6, 2004 the towns of Nagashima and Tado merged into the city of Kuwana.
