= Tado Taisha =

Shinto shrine in Mie Prefecture, Japan

Tado Taisha 多度大社
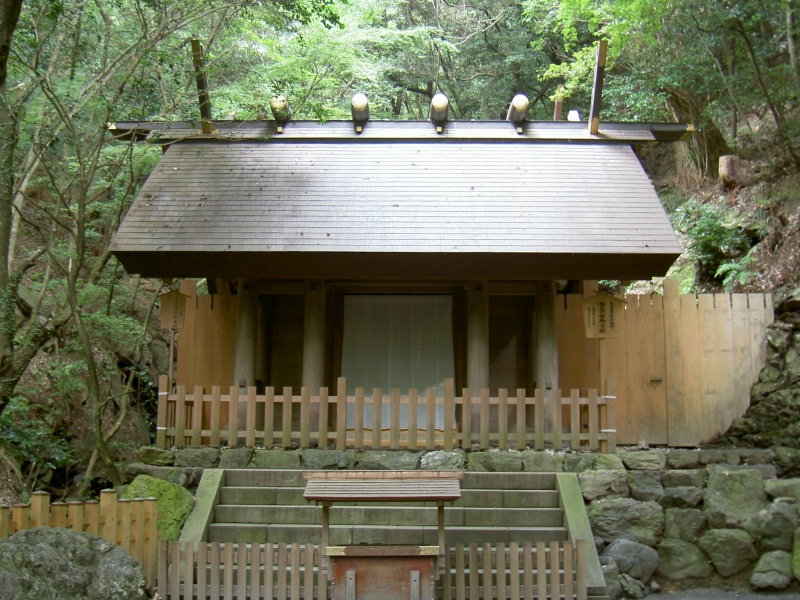
- The honden

- Location within Japan

Religion
- Affiliation: Shinto
- Deity: Amatsuhikone

Location
- Location: 1681 Tado, Tado-chō, Kuwana; Mie 511-0106
- Interactive map of Tado Taisha 多度大社
- Coordinates: 35°08′07.8″N 136°37′21.5″E

Website
- www.tadotaisya.or.jp

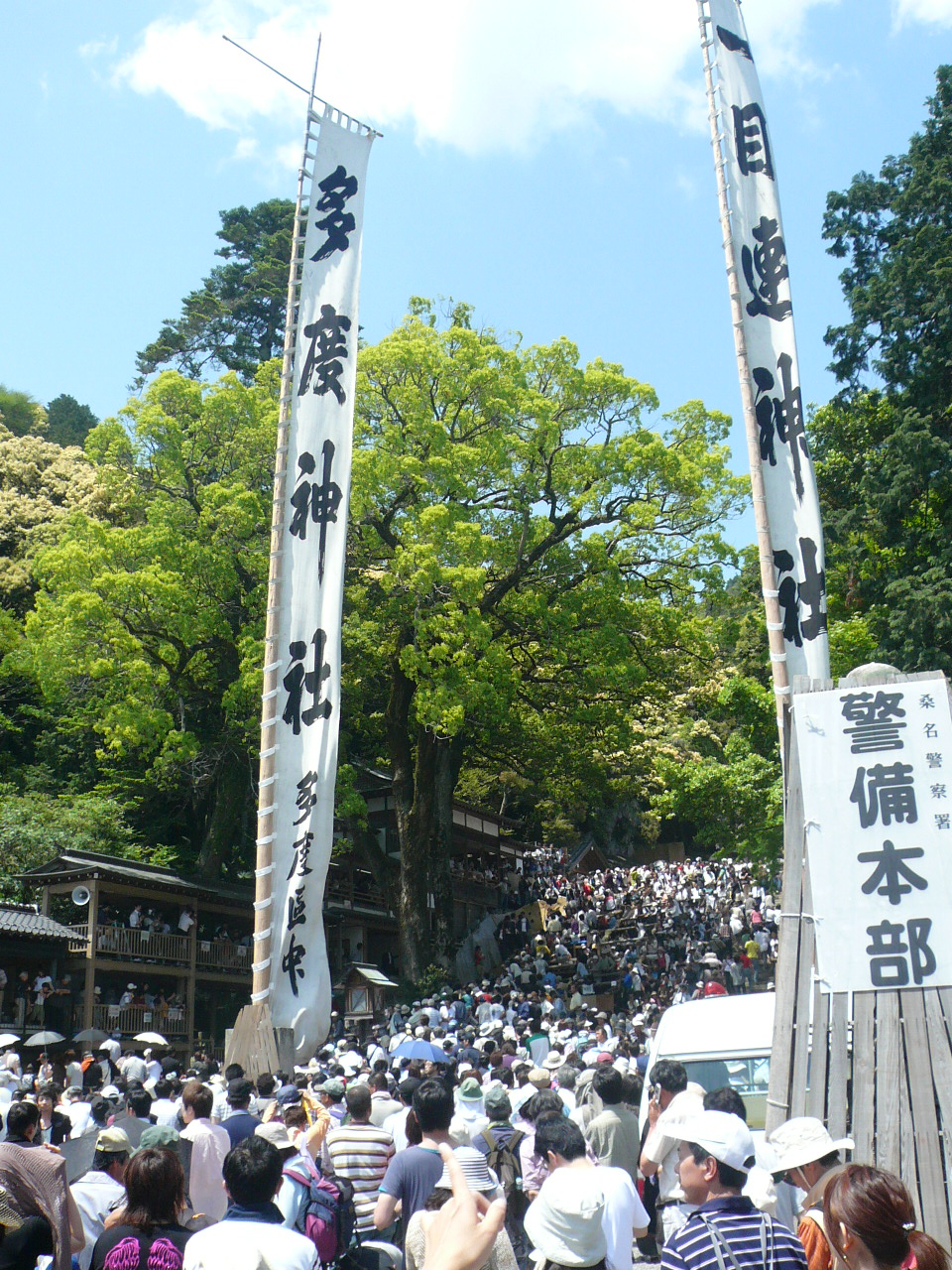
The entrance to Tado Shrine during the Tado Festival

Tado Shrine (多度大社, Tado Taisha) is a Shinto shrine located in the Tado-chō area of the city of Kuwana in Mie Prefecture, Japan. It is well known for its Tado Festival, which takes place on May 4 and 5 every year. The shrine has five nationally designated and one prefecturally designated Important Cultural Properties.

It was formerly a national shrine of the first rank (国幣大社, kokuhei taisha) in the Modern system of ranked Shinto Shrines.

== Festivals ==
- Tado Festival (May 4–5): The largest of the events at the shrine, it involves young men riding horses up a hill and over a wall.
- Chōchin Festival (Saturday and Sunday in late-July): A lantern festival.
- Yabusame Festival (November 23): A horseback riding archery competition.
