= Tado, Mie =

Dissolved municipality in Mie prefecture, Japan

Tado (多度町, Tado-chō) was a town located in Kuwana District, Mie Prefecture, Japan.

As of 2003, the town had an estimated population of 10,594 and a density of 222.66 persons per km^{2}. The total area was 47.58 km^{2}.

On December 6, 2004, Tado, along with the town of Nagashima (also from Kuwana District), was merged into the expanded city of Kuwana and thus no longer exists as an independent municipality.

It was famous for the Tado Festival, which still takes place at Tado Shrine every year.
