= Nagashima, Mie =

Dissolved municipality in Mie prefecture, Japan

Nagashima (長島町, Nagashima-chō) was a town located in Kuwana District, Mie Prefecture, Japan.

As of 2003, the town had an estimated population of 15,667 and a density of 493.76 persons per km^{2}. The total area was 31.73 km^{2}.

On December 6, 2004, Nagashima, along with the town of Tado (also from Kuwana District), was merged into the expanded city of Kuwana and thus no longer exists as an independent municipality.

== History ==
The Sieges of Nagashima took place in 1571, 1573 and 1574, finally resulting in the destruction of the Ikkō-ikki defenders by warlord Oda Nobunaga.

Nagashima was heavily damaged by the Isewan Typhoon in 1959.
