= Sangi Railway Hokusei Line =

Narrow gauge (762mm/2'6") railway line in Mie Prefecture, Japan

Hokusei Line

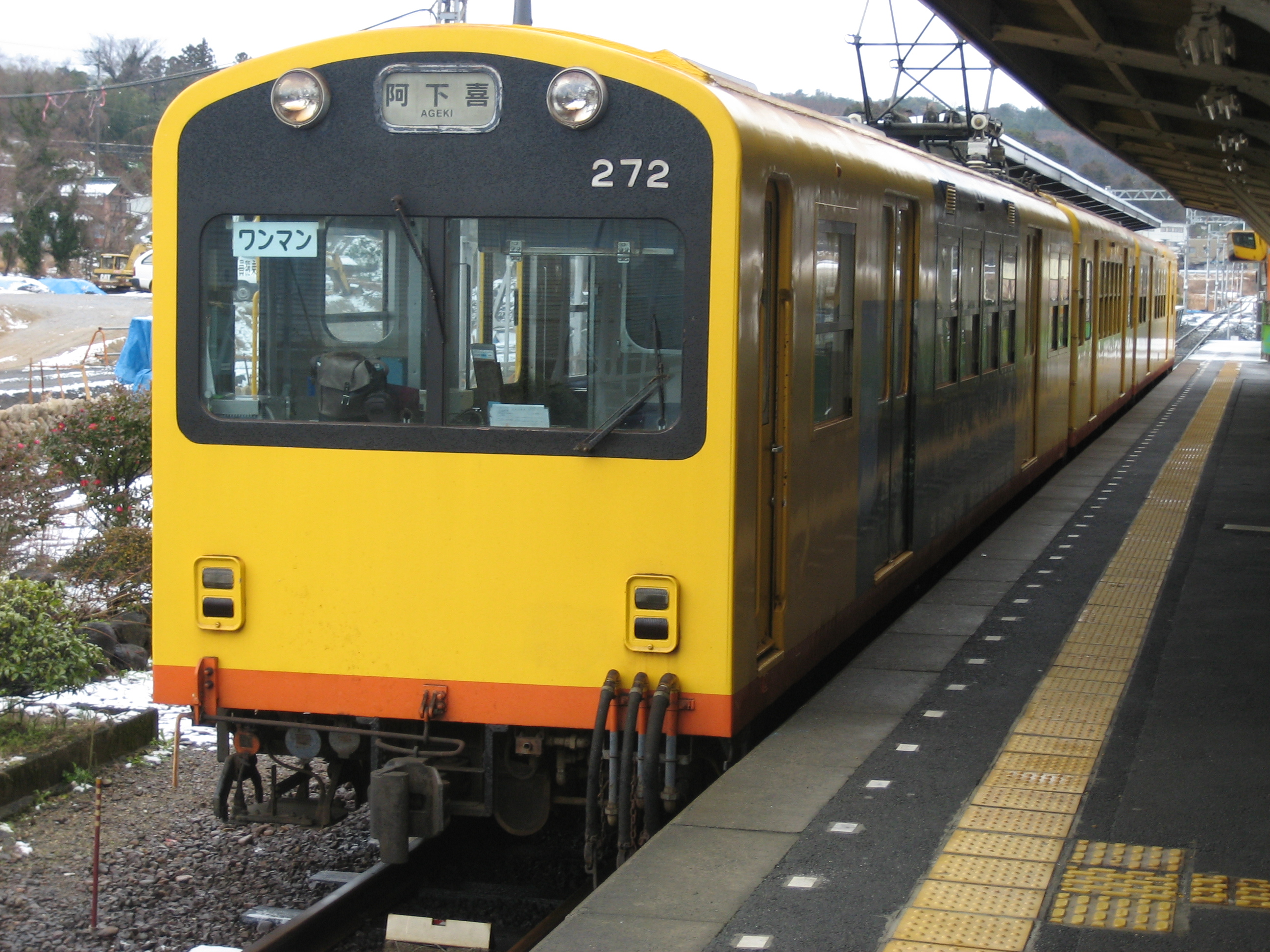
- A train bound for Ageki

Overview
- Locale: Mie Prefecture
- Termini: Nishi-Kuwana; Ageki
- Stations: 13

Service
- Type: Commuter rail
- Operator(s): Sangi Railway

History
- Opened: 5 April 1914; 112 years ago

Technical
- Line length: 20.4 km (12.7 mi)
- Number of tracks: 1
- Track gauge: 762 mm (2 ft 6 in)
- Electrification: Overhead, 750 V DC
- Operating speed: 45 km/h (28 mph)

The Hokusei Line (北勢線, Hokusei-sen), commonly known as the Sangi Hokusei Line, is a 762 mm (2 ft 6 in) narrow gauge railway line owned and operated by Sangi Railway, a Japanese private railway company. The line runs in Mie Prefecture and connects Nishi-Kuwana Station in Kuwana with Ageki Station in Inabe. For many years, the line was owned by Kintetsu, a major private railway operator, but control was transferred to Sangi in April 2003.

The name Hokusei (北勢) means "northern Mie". It is a kanji abbreviation of "north" (北) and "Ise" (伊勢). Ise (as opposed to "Mie") is used in the name because the northern and central parts of present-day Mie Prefecture were called Ise Province during the Edo era before the modern prefecture system was established.

== Services ==
All services are classified as "Local" (普通, futsū), stopping at every station, and are driver-only operations. There are two services per hour during the day, increased to three per hour during morning and evening peaks.

== Stations ==
Station		Distance (km)	Transfers	Location	
Nishi-Kuwana	西桑名	0.0	JR Central Kansai Main Line (Kuwana); Kintetsu Nagoya Line (Kuwana) ■ Yōrō Railway Yōrō Line (Kuwana)	Kuwana	Mie Prefecture
Umamichi	馬道	1.1		Kuwana	Mie Prefecture
Nishibessho	西別所	2.0		Kuwana	Mie Prefecture
Rengeji	蓮花寺	3.3		Kuwana	Mie Prefecture
Ariyoshi	在良	4.1		Kuwana	Mie Prefecture
Hoshikawa	星川	5.5		Kuwana	Mie Prefecture
Nanawa	七和	6.9		Kuwana	Mie Prefecture
Anoh	穴太	8.0		Tōin	Mie Prefecture
Tōin	東員	9.7		Tōin	Mie Prefecture
Ōizumi	大泉	12.4		Inabe	Mie Prefecture
Sohara	楚原	14.4		Inabe	Mie Prefecture
Ohda	麻生田	18.1		Inabe	Mie Prefecture
Ageki	阿下喜	20.4		Inabe	Mie Prefecture

At Kuwana Station, a short walk from Nishi-Kuwana Station, passengers can transfer to the Kansai Main Line, the Nagoya Line, and the Yōrō Line.

== History ==
The section of the line between Ōyamada Station (大山田駅) (present-day Nishi-Kuwana Station) and Sohara was opened on 5 April 1914 by the Hokusei Railway, with services operated using steam haulage. The line was extended to Ageki on 8 July 1931 and electrified at 600 V DC. On 11 February 1944, the line became part of Mie Kotsu (三重交通), and in 1954, the line voltage was increased to 750 V DC.

Kintetsu acquired the line on 1 April 1965, and from 1 April 2003, it was operated by the Sangi Railway.

== Narrow gauge ==
The line uses an especially narrow 762 mm (2 ft 6 in) track gauge. In the early 20th century, many of Japan's local railway lines were built using this gauge, however the vast majority of them were widened in the mid 20th century. Today, only four of these original 762 mm (2 ft 6 in) gauge lines are left operating regular passenger services, of which the Hokusei Line is the longest. This rarity makes the Hokusei Line (as well as the other 762 mm (2 ft 6 in) gauge lines) popular with railway enthusiasts.

The other lines in Japan using this gauge include the Kurobe Gorge Railway in Toyama, and the Utsube Line and the Hachiōji Line operated by Yokkaichi Asunarou Railway in Mie. Like the Hokusei Line, the Utsube and Hachioji Lines were formerly operated by Kintetsu.
