= Tado Festival =

Japanese festival

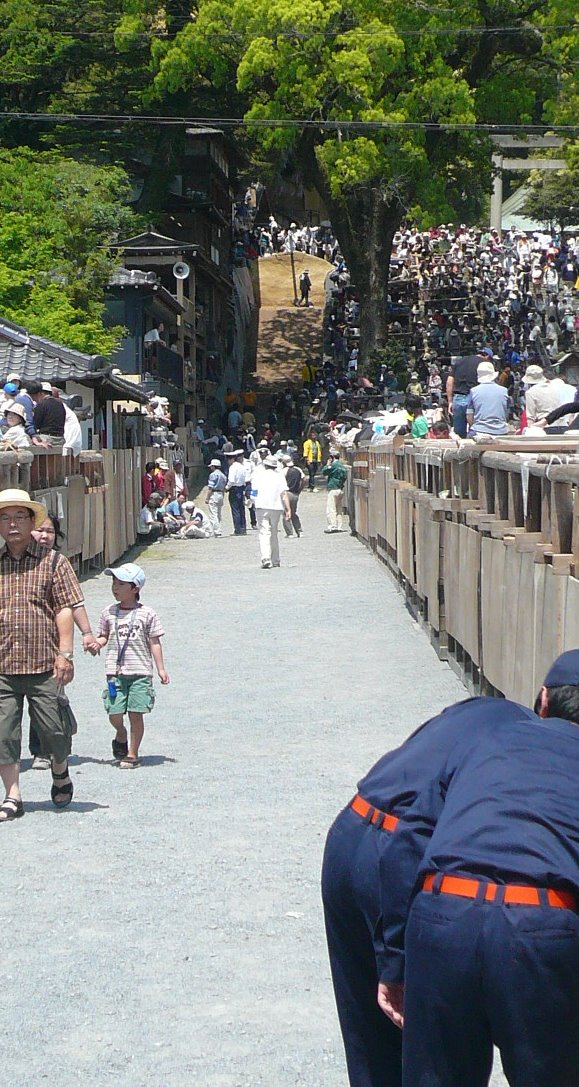
The runway, hill and wall at the Tado Festival

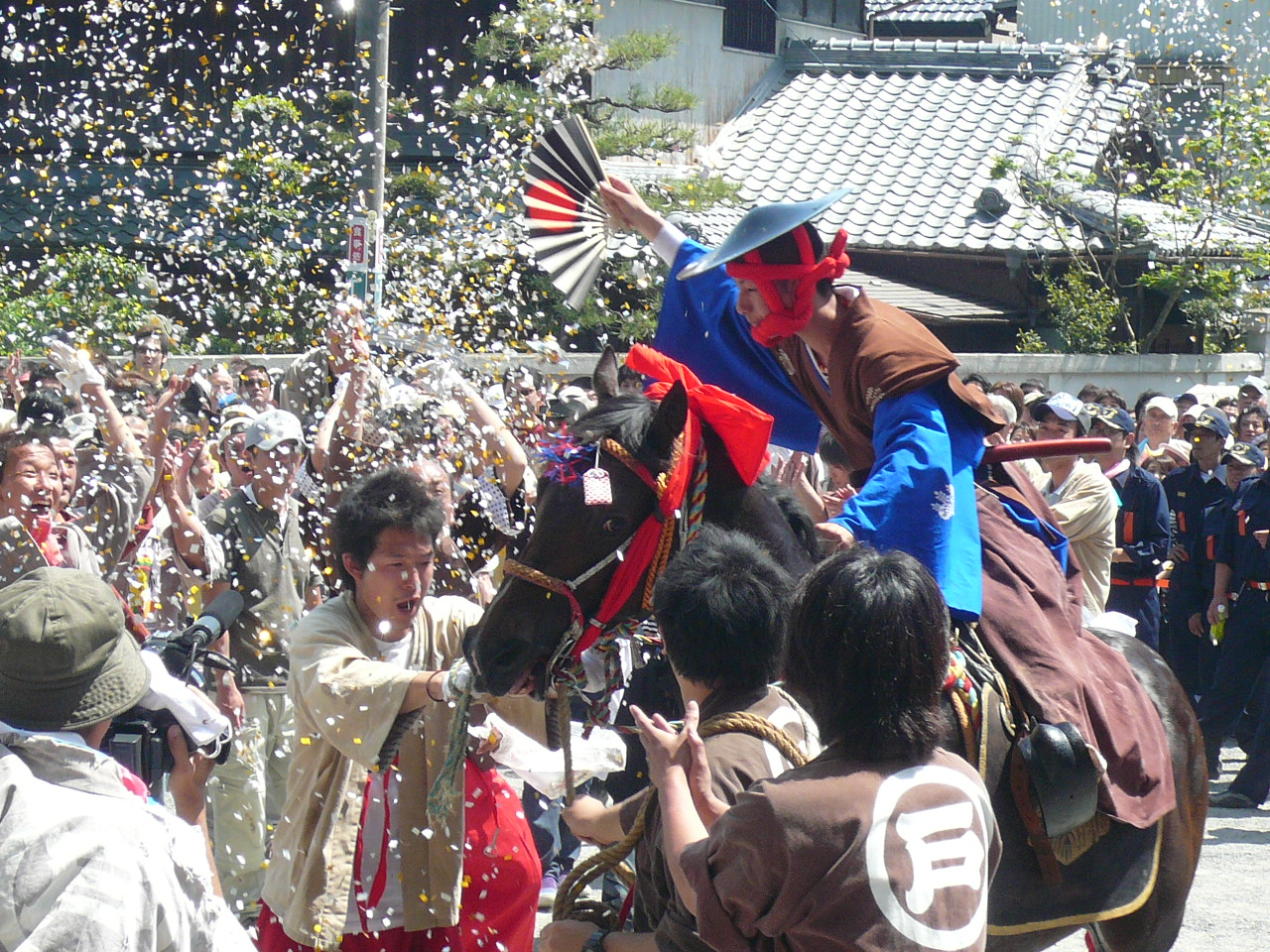
A rider after attempting a jump over the wall

The Tado Festival (多度祭, Tado Matsuri) is a Japanese festival that takes place every year during Japan's Golden Week on May 4 and 5 at Tado Shrine in the city of Kuwana, Mie Prefecture.

== Event description ==
The main event for the festival is a horse jumping event. The horses are ridden by young males around the ages of 17–19 representing the six sections of the city. The horses run up a hill before trying to jump over a two-meter high wall. On the first day, each area's representative jumps over the wall twice for a total of 12 jumps. On the second day, each representative only makes one attempt for a total of six jumps. Other events follow the horse jumping on the second day, including yabusame, a form of archery.

This event was named one of Mie Prefecture's Designated Intangible Cultural Properties in 1978.

From 2020 to 2022, this traditional festival was completely suspended as a preventative measure for the COVID-19 pandemic.
