= Tado° =

German home automation producer

tado° GmbH
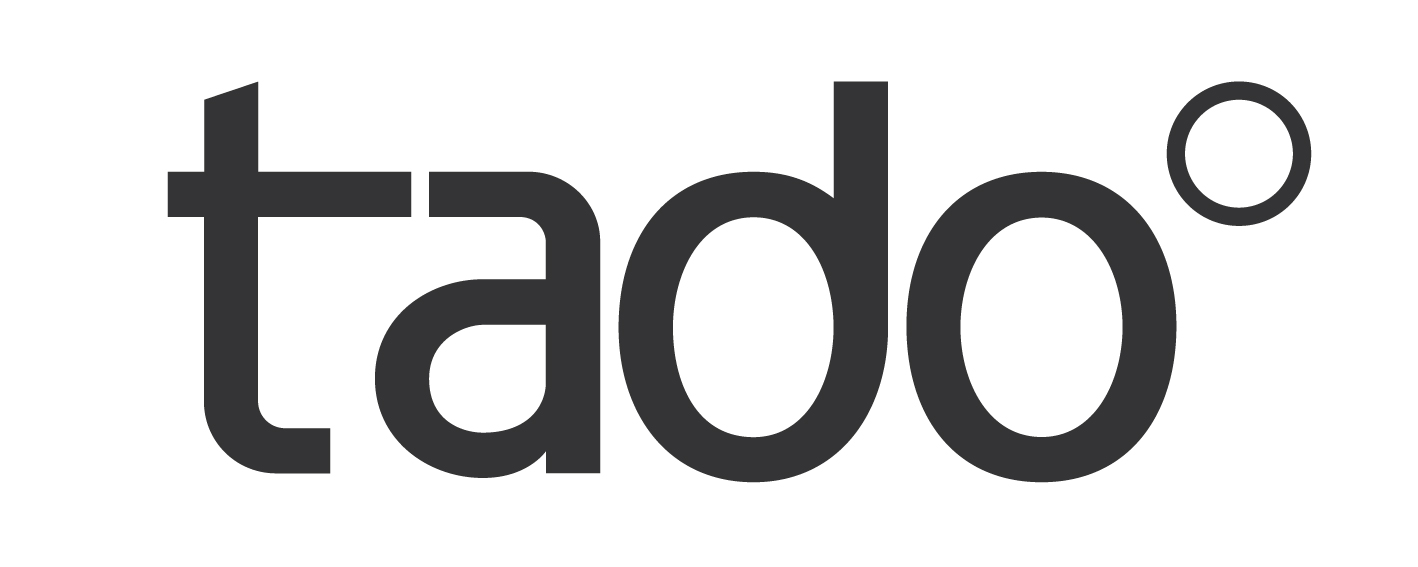
- Type: GmbH
- Industry: Home automation
- Founded: 2011
- Headquarters: Munich, Germany
- Key people: Christian Deilmann, Johannes Schwarz, Sven Hanser
- Products: Software, services and hardware for intelligent home climate management
- Number of employees: 100+
- Website: www.tado.com

tado° GmbH is a German technology company headquartered in Munich (Germany) and a manufacturer of home thermostats and air conditioning controls.

== History ==
tado° was founded in Munich by Christian Deilmann, Johannes Schwarz and Valentin Sawadski in September 2011. The company name is derived from the Japanese salutation "tadaima" ("I'm back home") and "okaeri" ("Welcome back") since geofencing was the first key feature of the tado° system in 2011. The company's first product, tado° Heating, was launched in November 2012 in Germany, Austria, and Switzerland, and in 2013 in the United Kingdom.

In July 2014, tado° closed a €10 million ($13.6m) funding round from, among others, Target Partners and Shortcut Ventures.

The company's second product, tado° Smart AC Control, for intelligent cooling, was launched in Europe and the USA in June 2015. The launch event took place in New York City.

== Products ==
Besides reducing energy consumption and increasing savings, the thermostat considers the residents' overall comfort. tado° detects the absence or presence of residents via their smartphones, and then adjusts the heating automatically. Weather forecasts and the heating properties of a home such as insulation are taken into account.

One challenge for tado° is the heterogeneous heating landscape in Europe and the integration and support of their control interfaces. By 2014, over 5,000 different heating systems can be controlled by tado° Heating.

In June 2015, tado° launched its second product, the Smart AC Control. It is not a thermostat. It turns any air conditioning unit into a smarter device. tado° Smart AC Control uses a smartphone's location to be able to determine whether the resident is at home and automatically turns the AC on or off. The air conditioner can also be manually operated via the Smart AC Control using the tado° app.

In August 2017, tado° announced the integration of Google Assistant, allowing customers who both own a tado° system and a Google Assistant device to control their Tado system via voice commands. For example, available voice commands are "What's the humidity in the bedroom?" or "Lower the bedroom temperature by 2°C".
