= Japan National Route 421 =

Road in Japan

National Route 421
- 国道421号

Route information
- Length: 72.0 km (44.7 mi)

Location
- Country: Japan

Highway system
- National highways of Japan; Expressways of Japan
← National Route 420	→ National Route 422

National Route 421 is a national highway of Japan connecting Kuwana, Mie and Ōmihachiman, Shiga in Japan, with a total length of 72 km (44.74 mi).
