= Ageki Station =

Railway station in Inabe, Mie Prefecture, Japan

Ageki Station 阿下喜駅
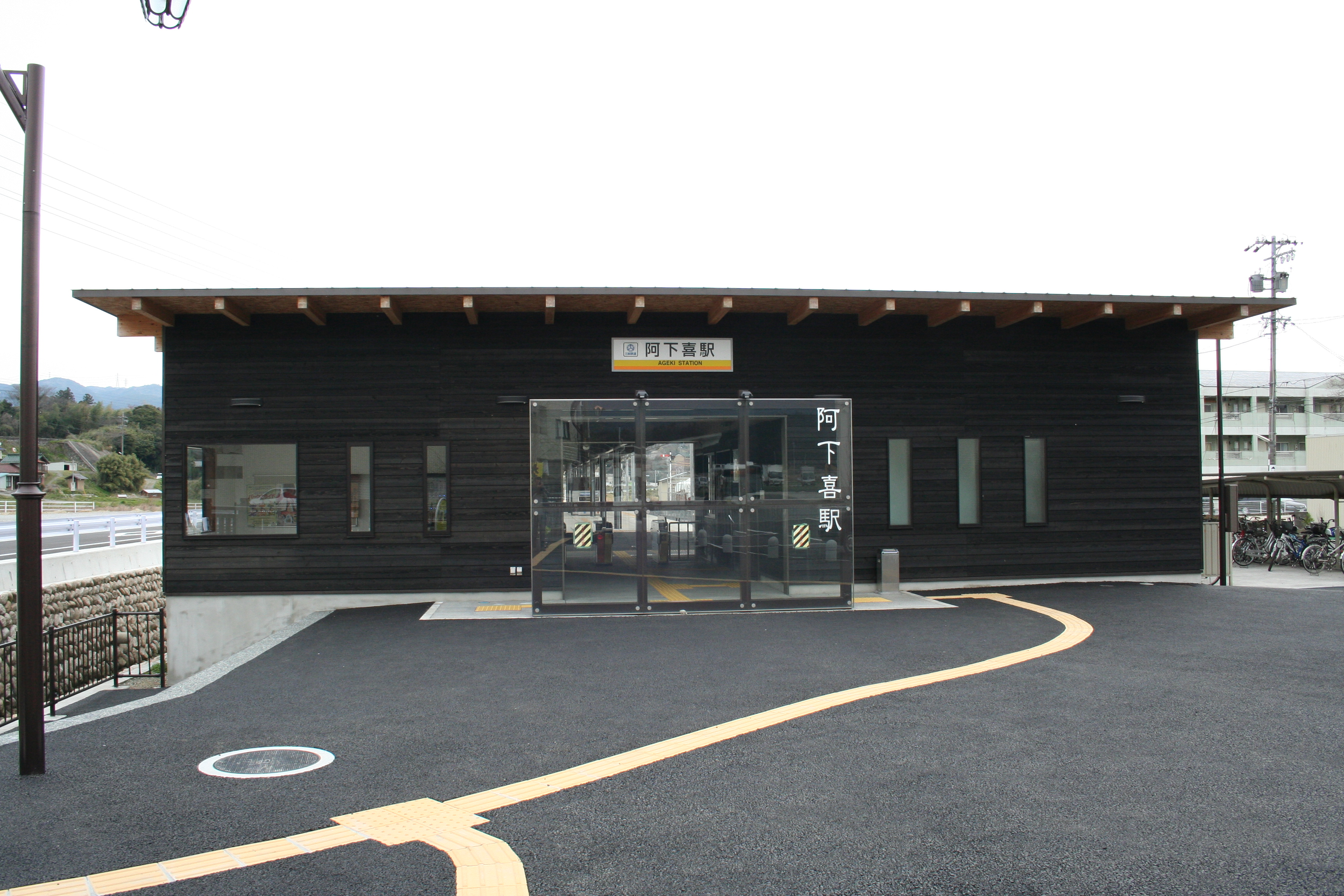
- Ageki Station

General information
- Location: Hokuse-cho Ageki 687, Inabe-shi, Mie-ken 511-0428; Japan
- Coordinates: 35°08′47″N 136°31′09″E
- Operator: Sangi Railway
- Line: Hokusei Line
- Distance: 20.4 km from Nishi-Kuwana
- Platforms: 1 island platform

History
- Opened: July 8, 1931

Passengers
- FY2019: 320 daily

Services
Preceding station	Sangi Railway	Following station
Ohda towards Nishi-Kuwana	Hokusei Line	Terminus
Location
- Location within Mie Prefecture Location within Japan

Ageki Station (阿下喜駅, Ageki-eki) is a passenger railway station located in the city of Inabe, Mie Prefecture, Japan, operated by the private railway operator Sangi Railway.

== Lines ==
Ageki Station is the terminus of the Hokusei Line, and is located 20.4 kilometres from the opposing terminus of the line at Nishi-Kuwana Station.

== Layout ==
The station consists of a single deadheaded island platform, with trains bound for Nishi-Kuwana using either side of the platform.

=== Platforms ===
1	■ Hokusei Line	for Nishi-Kuwana
2	■ Hokusei Line	for Nishi-Kuwana

== History ==
- July 8, 1931: Station opens as part of Hokusei Railway.
- June 27, 1934: Hokusei Railway officially renamed Hokusei Electric Railway.
- February 11, 1944: Station falls under the ownership of Sanco following merger.
- February 1, 1964: Station falls under the ownership of Mie Electric Railway after railway division of Sanco splits off and forms separate company.
- April 1, 1965: Station falls under the ownership of Kintetsu following merger.
- March 25, 1977: Platform length extended from 51 m to 61 m.
- March 31, 1978: Platform length extended from 61 m to 71 m
- October 1, 1999: Automatic ticket machine installed. Stations becomes unstaffed.
- April 1, 2003: Kintetsu transfers control of Hokusei Line to Sangi Railway. Station falls under the ownership of Sangi.
- March 15, 2004: Free parking lot opens outside of station.
- February 14, 2006: New platform opens.
- March 23, 2006: Second terminal track opens.
- December 1, 2006: New station building opens, station is staffed again.

== Passenger statistics ==
In fiscal 2019, the station was used by an average of 320 passengers daily (boarding passengers only).

== Surrounding area ==
- former Hokusei Town Hall
- Ageki Onsen

== See also ==
- List of railway stations in Japan
