= Nishi-Kuwana Station =

Railway station in Kuwana, Mie Prefecture, Japan

Nishi-Kuwana Station 西桑名駅
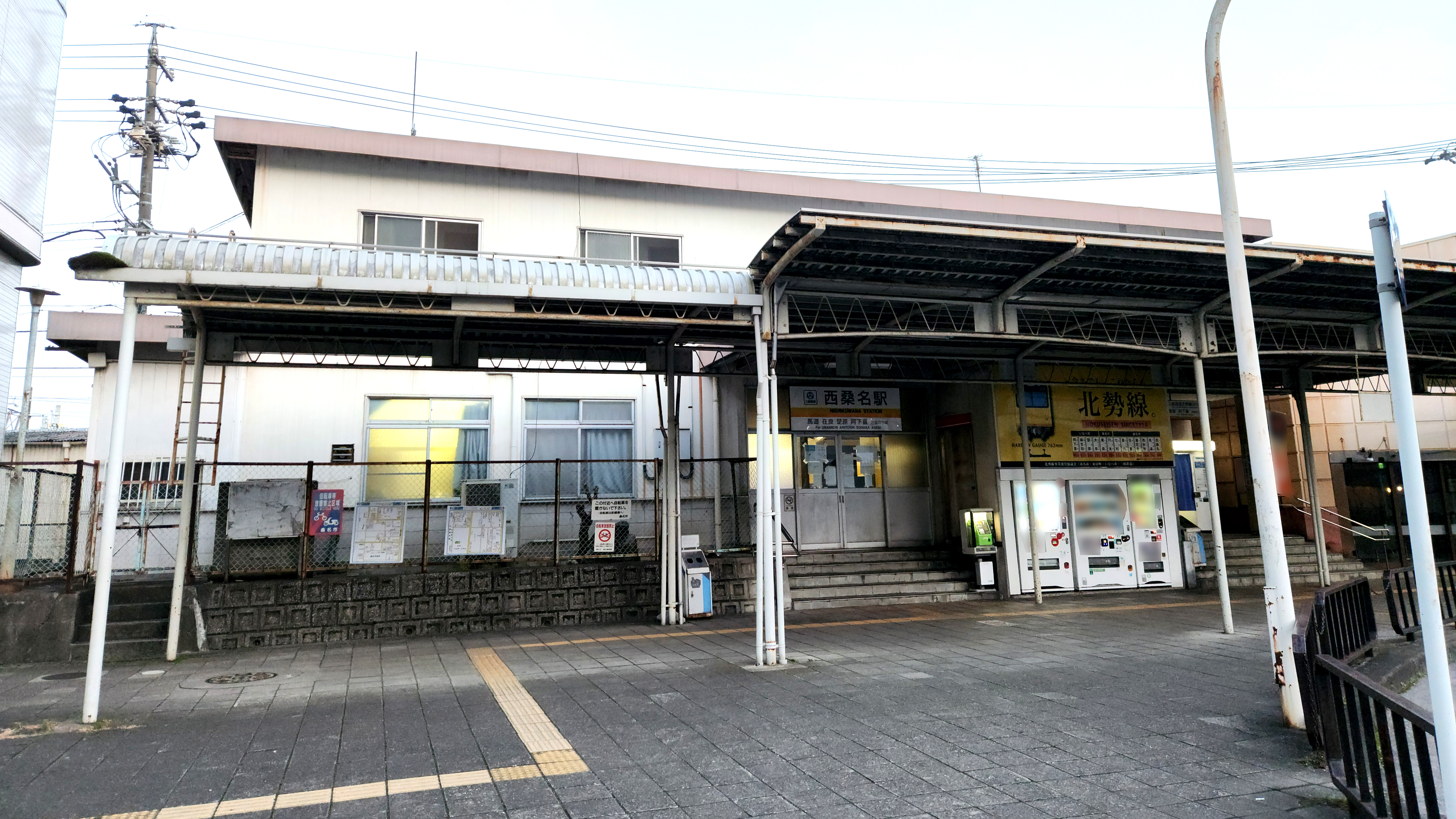
- Station building in April 2025

General information
- Location: Kotobuki-cho 2-31, Kuwana-shi, Mie-ken 511-0061; Japan
- Coordinates: 35°03′56″N 136°41′02″E
- Operator: Sangi Railway
- Line: Hokusei Line
- Distance: 20.4 km from Ageki
- Platforms: 1 side platform

History
- Opened: April 5, 1914
- Former names: Ōyamada (until 1931)

Passengers
- FY2019: 2662 daily

Services
Preceding station	Sangi Railway	Following station
Terminus	Hokusei Line	Umamichi towards Ageki
Location
- Location within Mie Prefecture Location within Japan

Nishi-Kuwana Station (西桑名駅, Nishi-Kuwana-eki) is a passenger railway station located in the city of Kuwana, Mie Prefecture, Japan, operated by the private railway operator Sangi Railway. The station is immediately adjacent to Kuwana Station, which services the Kansai Main Line, Kintetsu Nagoya Line and the Yōrō Line. The station is used primarily by morning and evening commuters to school and work. Many passengers proceed on to Nagoya and Yokkaichi via Kintetsu and JR at Kuwana Station.

== Lines ==
Nishi-Kuwana Station is a terminus of the Hokusei Line, and is located 20.4 kilometres from the opposing terminus of the line at Ageki Station.

== Layout ==
The station consists of a single dead-headed side platform.

=== Platforms ===
1	■ Sangi Railway Hokusei Line	For Ageki

== History ==
- April 5, 1914: Station opens as part of Hokusei Railway under the name of Ōyamada Station (大山田駅 Ōyamada-eki).
- July 8, 1931: Station officially renamed Nishi-Kuwana Station.
- June 27, 1934: Hokusei Railway officially renamed Hokusei Electric Railway.
- February 11, 1944: Station falls under the ownership of Sanco following merger.
- November 1, 1961: Kuwana-Kyōbashi ~ Nishi-Kuwana section of Hokusei Line closes. Nishi-Kuwana becomes origin of Hokusei Line.
- February 1, 1964: Station falls under the ownership of Mie Electric Railway after railway division of Sanco splits off and forms separate company.
- April 1, 1965: Station falls under the ownership of Kintetsu following merger.
- May 1, 1977: Station moved slightly to the south.
- April 1, 2003: Kintetsu transfers control of Hokusei Line to Sangi Railway. Station falls under the ownership of Sangi.
- August 31, 2003: Heating and air conditioning installed in passenger waiting room.
- December 1, 2003: Automatic ticket gates installed. Fair adjustment machine installed.
- March 26, 2005: Hokusei Line control station moved from Nishi-Kuwana to Tōin.

== Passenger statistics ==
In fiscal 2019, the station was used by an average of 2662 passengers daily (boarding passengers only).

== Surrounding area ==
- Kuwana Station (JR, Kintetsu, and Yōrō Railway)
- Nagashima Spa Land (via bus)
- Kuwana City Hall
- Kyūka Park, site of the old Kuwana Castle
- Part of Kuwana-juku, a station of the Tōkaidō
- Apita shopping center

== See also ==
- List of railway stations in Japan
