= Sunset, Vancouver =

Sunset
- Neighbourhood
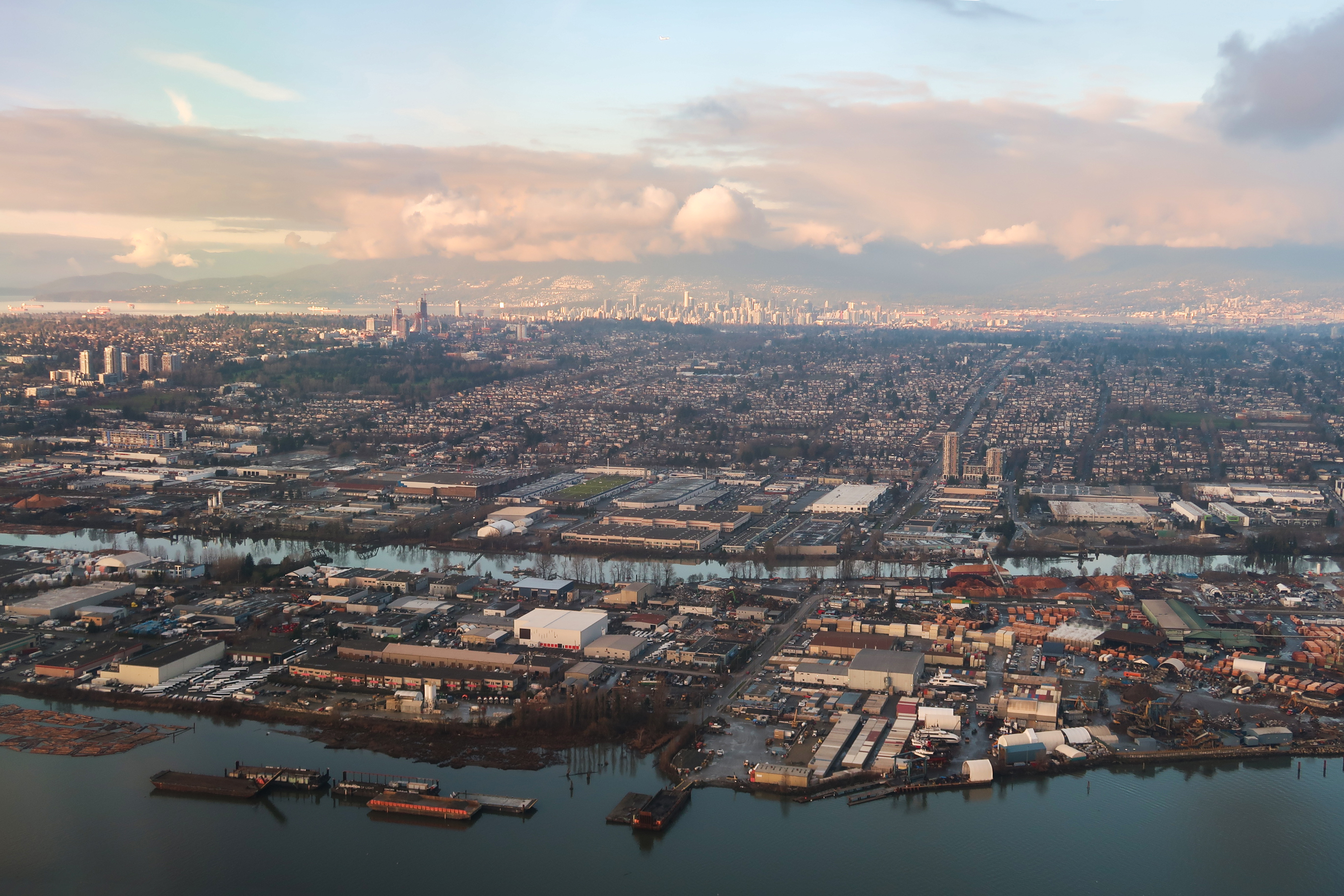
- Aerial view of Sunset in December, 2024

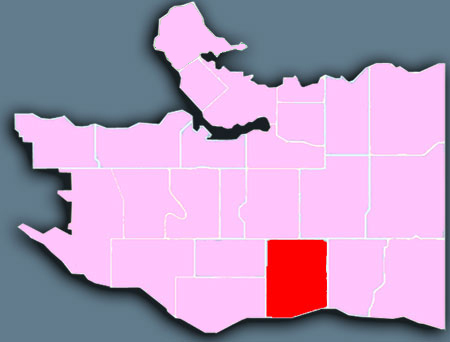
- Location of the Sunset neighbourhood in Vancouver

- Location in Metro Vancouver
- Coordinates: 49.218°N 123.066°W
- Country: Canada
- Province: British Columbia
- City: Vancouver

Government
  - MP: Liberal Harjit Sajjan (Vancouver South)
  - MLAs: NDP George Chow (Vancouver-Fraserview)

Area
  - Total: 6.26 km^{2} (2.42 sq mi)

Population (2016)
  - Total: 36,500
  - Density: 5,830.6/km^{2} (15,101/sq mi)
- Website: https://vancouver.ca/news-calendar/sunset.aspx

Sunset is one of the most ethnically diverse neighbourhoods in Vancouver, British Columbia. It is located in the south-east quadrant of the city. Surrounding the multicultural Fraser Street district, Sunset is bordered by both the Marpole and Oakridge neighbourhoods to the west, and the Victoria-Fraserview neighbourhood to the east.

== History ==
Development of the Sunset neighbourhood first took place in the 1860s. At the time, the area was part of the District of South Vancouver and consisted mostly of farmland alongside a cluster of homes. Extensive logging took place along the south slope of Vancouver during the late 19th into early 20th century, prompting communities such as Sunset to rapidly industrialize.

In 1929, the District of South Vancouver amalgamated with the City of Vancouver, thus incorporating Sunset as a part of the city. The neighbourhood remained quite rural until the 1940s, when a large wave immigrants from central and eastern Europe moved into the area. Many new German immigrants established churches, most of which remain to this day.

Beginning in the 1950s, into the 1960s and 1970s, another large wave of immigrants moved into Sunset. Primarily Sikhs from the Punjab region of South Asia, the new immigrants founded the Punjabi Market (Little India) on Main Street and presided over the last final large scale development in the neighbourhood with the construction of hundreds of Vancouver Specials. As most development in the area ceased in the 1980s, these homes continue to be a mainstay across southeast Vancouver.

Today, the neighbourhood is among the most ethnically diverse across Metro Vancouver and continues the serve as one of several centres of the South Asian community in Vancouver.

The Sunset neighborhood was dominated by bungalow homes constructed in the 1960s and 1970s; however, in the last 10 years, many of these smaller houses have been torn down and have been replaced by larger multi-level residences.

== Geography ==
Sunset lies between E 41st Avenue, Ontario St, Knight St and the Fraser River.

Commercial districts in Sunset are situated on Fraser Street between 41st and 51st avenues; named as Vancouver's most multicultural neighbourhood, the Fraser district features many South Asian, Chinese, Filipino and European businesses.

Another commercial district in Sunset is the Punjabi Market (also known as Little India) which is situated on Main Street and 49th Avenue.

Like most of south-east Vancouver, the area used to be predominantly working class but rising house prices elsewhere have made the area increasingly popular with young professionals and families who can no longer afford houses in areas such as the west side.

== Demographics ==
The neighbourhood contains the largest South Asian (33.6%) and Punjabi speaking (23%) population in the city.

Panethnic groups in the Sunset neighbourhood (2001−2016)
Panethnic group	2016		2006		2001	
Panethnic group	Pop.	%	Pop.	%	Pop.	%
South Asian	12,120	33.6%	13,140	37.3%	11,360	34.14%
East Asian (Note: Statistic includes total responses of "Chinese", "Korean", and "Japanese" under visible minority section on census.)	8,600	23.84%	9,010	25.57%	9,570	28.76%
Southeast Asian (Note: Statistic includes total responses of "Filipino" and "Southeast Asian" under visible minority section on census.)	6,880	19.07%	5,150	14.62%	4,445	13.36%
European (Note: Statistic includes all persons that did not make up part of a visible minority or an indigenous identity.)	5,650	15.66%	5,780	16.41%	6,455	19.4%
Indigenous	535	1.48%	365	1.04%	245	0.74%
Latin American	695	1.93%	665	1.89%	435	1.31%
Middle Eastern (Note: Statistic includes total responses of "West Asian" and "Arab" under visible minority section on census.)	340	0.94%	380	1.08%	100	0.3%
African	350	0.97%	350	0.99%	260	0.78%
Other/Multiracial (Note: Statistic includes total responses of "Visible minority, n.i.e." and "Multiple visible minorities" under visible minority section on census.)	910	2.52%	475	1.35%	395	1.19%
Total responses	36,075	98.84%	35,230	99.79%	33,275	99.55%
Total population	36,500	100%	35,305	100%	33,425	100%
Note: Totals greater than 100% due to multiple origin responses
