= Punjabi Market, Vancouver =

Punjabi Market
- Neighbourhood
- Nickname: Little India
- Location in Metro Vancouver
- Coordinates: 49.2257°N 123.1016°W
- Country: Canada
- Province: British Columbia
- City: Vancouver

The Punjabi Market, also known as Little India, is a commercial district and ethnic enclave in Vancouver, British Columbia. Officially recognized by the city as being primarily a major South Asian and Punjabi population business community and cultural area, Punjabi Market is situated on Main Street between 48th and 51st Avenues in the Sunset neighbourhood of South Vancouver.

The Market marked its 50th anniversary on May 31, 2020, virtually due to the COVID pandemic.

== History ==
=== Early immigration ===
The first South Asian immigrants from Punjab landed in Vancouver in the 1890s. One early Indian settlement came by the name of Paldi after a village near Hoshiarpur in Punjab. They settled down in Kitsilano near First Avenue and Burrard Street, where many worked in lumber mills and at construction sites throughout the Lower Mainland.

Indians who later immigrated to Vancouver are believed to have suffered the same treatment given to the Chinese (Chinatown) and Japanese (Japantown). They were subject to the bias and animosities of the predominantly Anglo-Saxon majority and occupied distinct and discrete quarters of the city. Most of the new residents sought established homes and to earn reasonably secure incomes. They settled in the area near 49th Avenue and Main Street and many established restaurants and businesses there and throughout the city to make a living. The settlers brought with them distinctive habits and attitudes that influenced the choice of food, work and recreational activity.

=== Establishment ===
Beginning in the 1950s, and continuing into the 1960s and 1970s, waves of South Asian – primarily Punjabi Sikh – immigrants settled and moved into the surrounding Sunset neighbourhood, and presided over the final large scale single-family residential development in the area with the construction of hundreds of Vancouver Specials.

Over time, the neighbourhood had become predominantly Indo-Canadian and on May 31, 1970, Sucha Singh and Harbans Kaur Claire opened the first shop on Main St, which would be joined by dozens more, between 48th and 50th avenues. The Claire's owned and ran Shan Sharees and Drapery.

In recognition of the cultural and business importance of the market, the first bilingual street-signs in Punjabi and English were installed in 1993 at the corner of 49th avenue and Main Street.

=== Present day ===
Presently, the Punjabi Market is in a period of transformation. Gradually beginning in the 1980s, the suburbanization of the South Asian community in Vancouver caused many to relocate from South Vancouver east towards Surrey and Delta due to high rents and housing prices on relatively small properties. Enticed by cheaper housing for larger properties, new waves of South Asian immigrants in the 1990s and 2000s also preferred to settle in Surrey and Delta. Coupled with high retail rents and the geographical shift in the consumer base, the decline of the Punjabi Market in South Vancouver as a prominent South Asian inner-city district has occurred over the past two decades, with reports in 2013 citing growing retail vacancies. The market has evolved from the traditional food, clothing and jewellery stores to a more diverse offering, which now includes a licensed cannabis shop. Small businesses have been a hallmark of the market throughout the years, but are facing headwinds. Recent development of commercial space has brought chain stores such as a Tim Hortons into the heart of the market.

In 2016, the City of Vancouver first engaged a study and a community planning process to review neighbourhood policies impacting arts, culture, retail and public spaces. In October 2019 six community engagement events were held taking feedback about priorities for residents and business owners. The City of Vancouver staff produced a summary, which included public priorities and 8 recommended actions for Council to consider for the near term. The recommended actions included: Historic Context Statement, Cultural Grants, Vancouver Plan Activities, Near Term Public Realm Improvements, 50th Anniversary Proclamation, Community Art in Public Realm-Call for Artists, Commercial Area Capacity Building Work and Business to Business Support, and Long Term Community Stewardship Partnership.

== Punjabi District ==
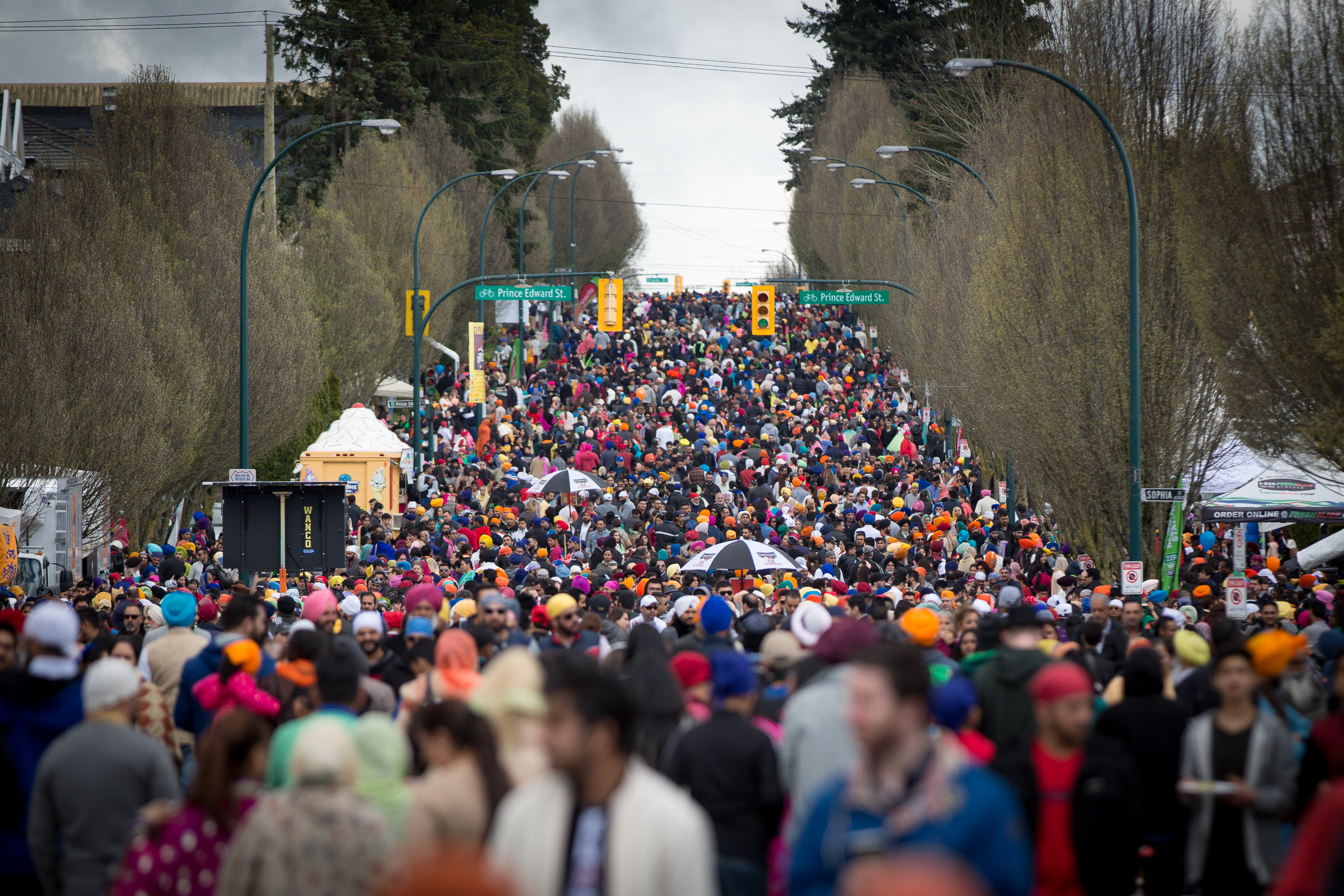
Vaisakhi Parade 2017, Punjabi Market, Vancouver

Over the years, the neighbourhood became increasingly popular among the nearly 300,000 South Asian residents in the city as a focal point for culture and commerce. There are a number of Indian restaurants, sweet shops, and grocers representing cuisine from varying parts of the subcontinent; as well as other businesses that cater to an Indo-Canadian community and tourists alike.

The market has become a shopping destination for many weddings because of the numerous Indian ethnic clothing and bridal goods that are available. There is also a significant number of jewelry stores lining the strip, said to be the highest concentration of jewellers in the nation.

== Events ==
Beginning in 1979, the Khalsa Diwan society at the Ross Street Gurdwara has celebrated Vaisakhi each year in April with a public celebration. Festivities include Vancouver's largest annual one-day parade, where up to 300,000 people come together from to celebrate the birth of the Sikh religion. Many restaurants and households near the strip offer local food tasting and other goods during the event. The City of Vancouver has granted the Vaisakhi Parade Civic Parades Category in 2013, which is reserved for events with >100,000 attendees.

== See also ==
- South Asians in Vancouver
- South Asians in British Columbia
