= South Asian Canadians in Greater Vancouver =

Ethnic group

South Asians in Greater Vancouver
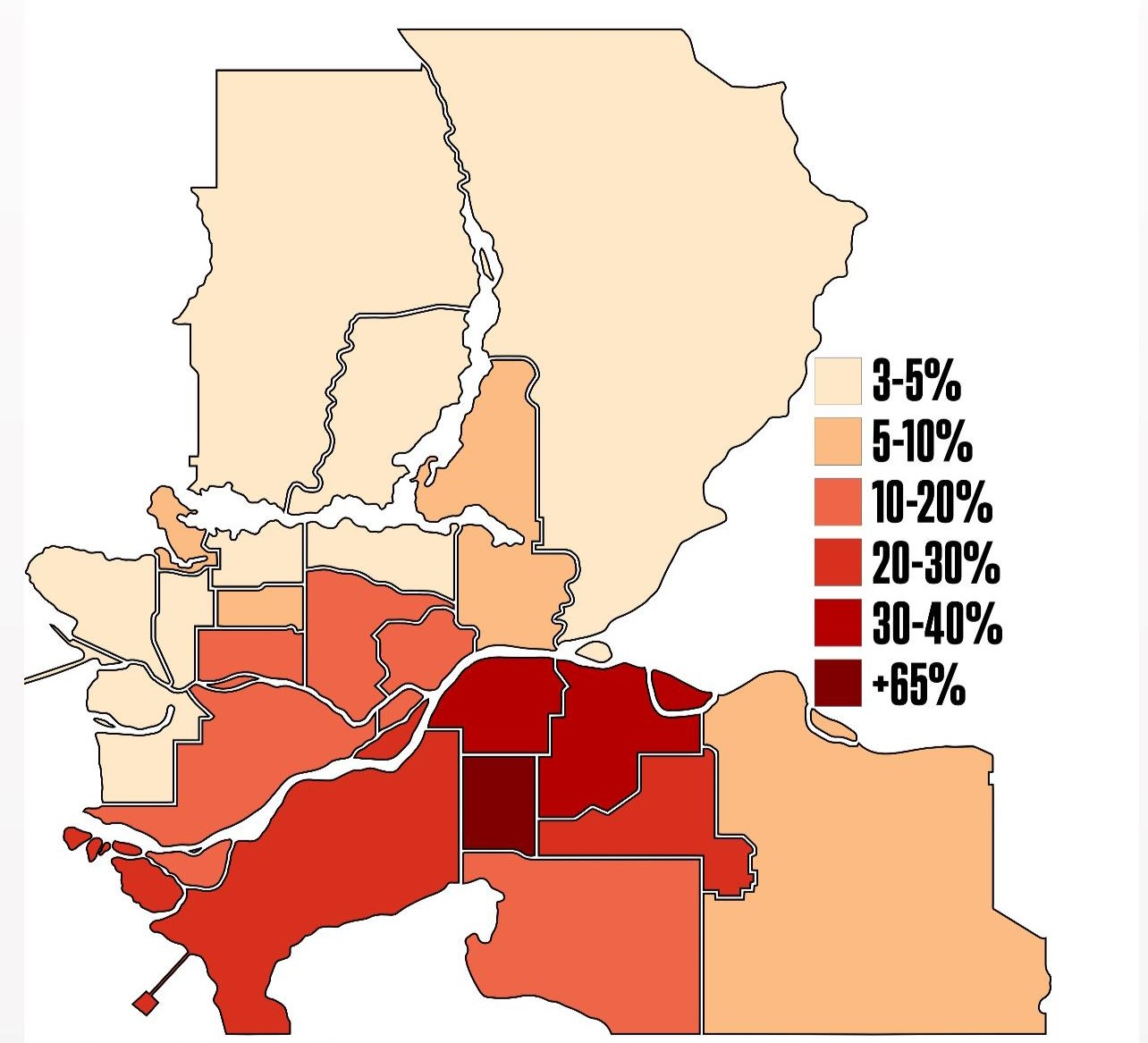
- Population distribution of South Asian Canadians in Vancouver by federal electoral district, 2021 census

Total population
- 369,295; 14.2% of the total Metro Vancouver population

Regions with significant populations
- Surrey: 212,680 (37.8%)
- Vancouver (City): 44,850 (6.9%)
- Delta: 27,990 (26.1%)
- Burnaby: 23,155 (9.4%)
- Richmond: 15,370 (7.4%)
- Langley: 8,720 (6.7%)
- New Westminster: 8,105 (10.4%)
- Coquitlam: 7,405 (5.0%)
- Maple Ridge: 4,245 (4.7%)
- Port Coquitlam: 3,490 (5.8%)

Languages
- Predominantly: English • Punjabi • Hindustani (Hindi-Urdu); Minorities: French • Gujarati • Tamil • Bengali

Religion
- Sikhism (59.6%); Hinduism (16.8%); Islam (10.7%); Irreligion (7.5%); Christianity (4.3%); Buddhism (0.7%); Jainism (0.2%); Zoroastrianism (0.1%); Judaism (0.04%); Baháʼí (0.02%); Others (0.1%)

Related ethnic groups
- South Asian Canadians • Indian Canadians • Pakistani Canadians • Punjabi Canadians

South Asian population history in Metro Vancouver
Year	Pop.	±%
1961	1,937	—
1971	10,750	+455.0%
1981	39,450	+267.0%
1986	51,975	+31.7%
1991	86,190	+65.8%
1996	125,355	+45.4%
2001	164,365	+31.1%
2006	207,165	+26.0%
2011	252,405	+21.8%
2016	291,005	+15.3%
2021	369,295	+26.9%
Source: Statistics Canada

South Asian Canadians in Metro Vancouver are the third-largest pan-ethnic group in the region, comprising 369,295 persons or 14.2 percent of the total population as of 2021. Sizable communities exist within the city of Vancouver along with the adjoining city of Surrey, which is home to one of the world's largest South Asian enclaves.

South Asians have lived in the Vancouver region since the late 19th century; at first, mainly working in the forestry industry. After an initial first wave of immigration during the early 20th century, government policies aimed at curtailing immigration from the Indian subcontinent resulted in a populated stagnation through the 1950s. At that time, the relaxing of racial and national immigration restrictions by the federal government initiated a new wave of immigration into Vancouver and has continued into the present day.

The vast majority of South Asians in Greater Vancouver and in adjacent cities are Punjabi Sikhs, differing greatly from the diverse ethnic and religious composition of South Asians in Canada. The large proportion of Punjabi Sikhs in the region has resulted in the interchangeable and synonymous usage of one and the other.

Over half (60.3 percent) of South Asian Canadians live in the Toronto and Vancouver areas as of 2021.

== History ==
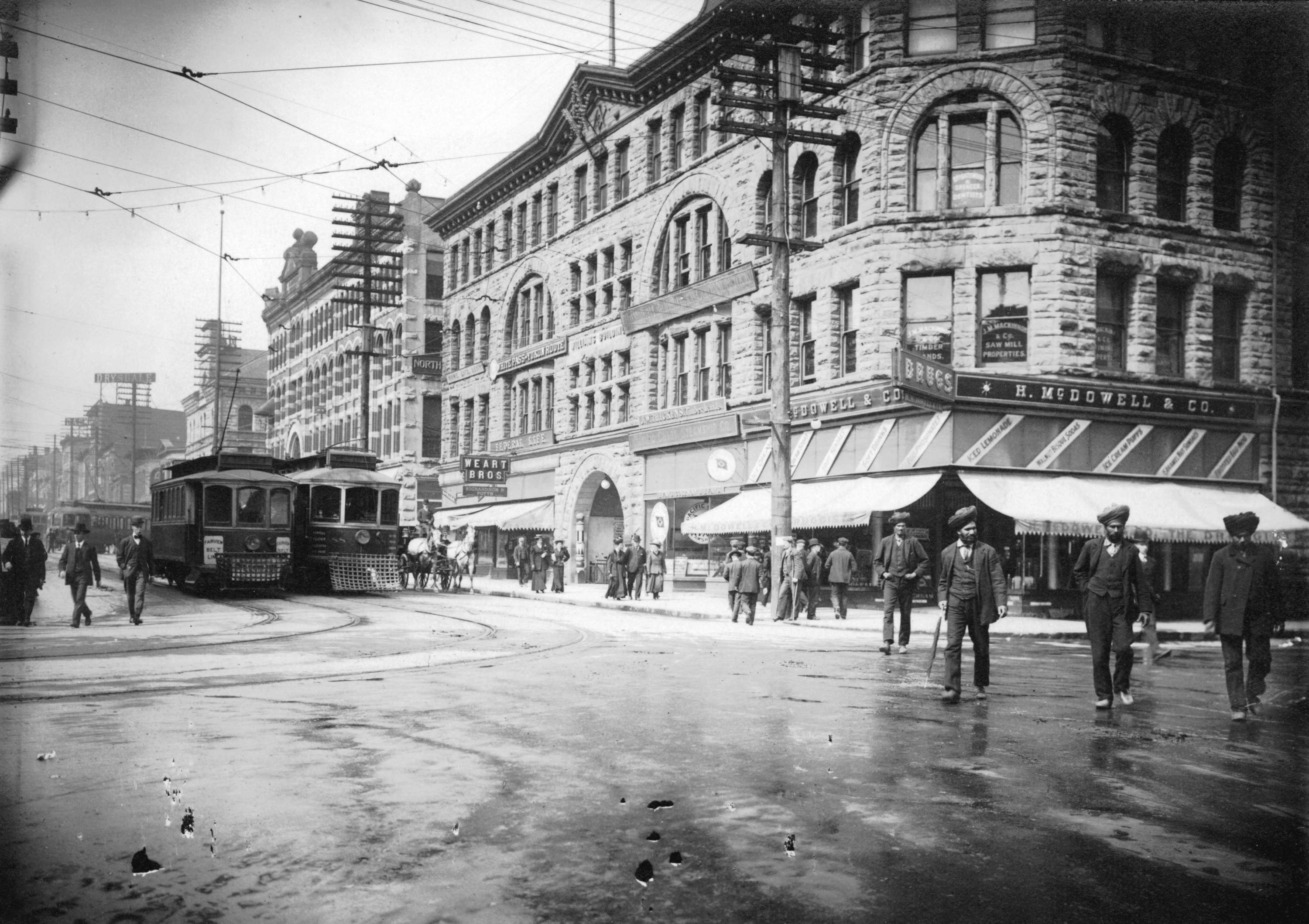
Punjabi Sikhs in Vancouver, 1908

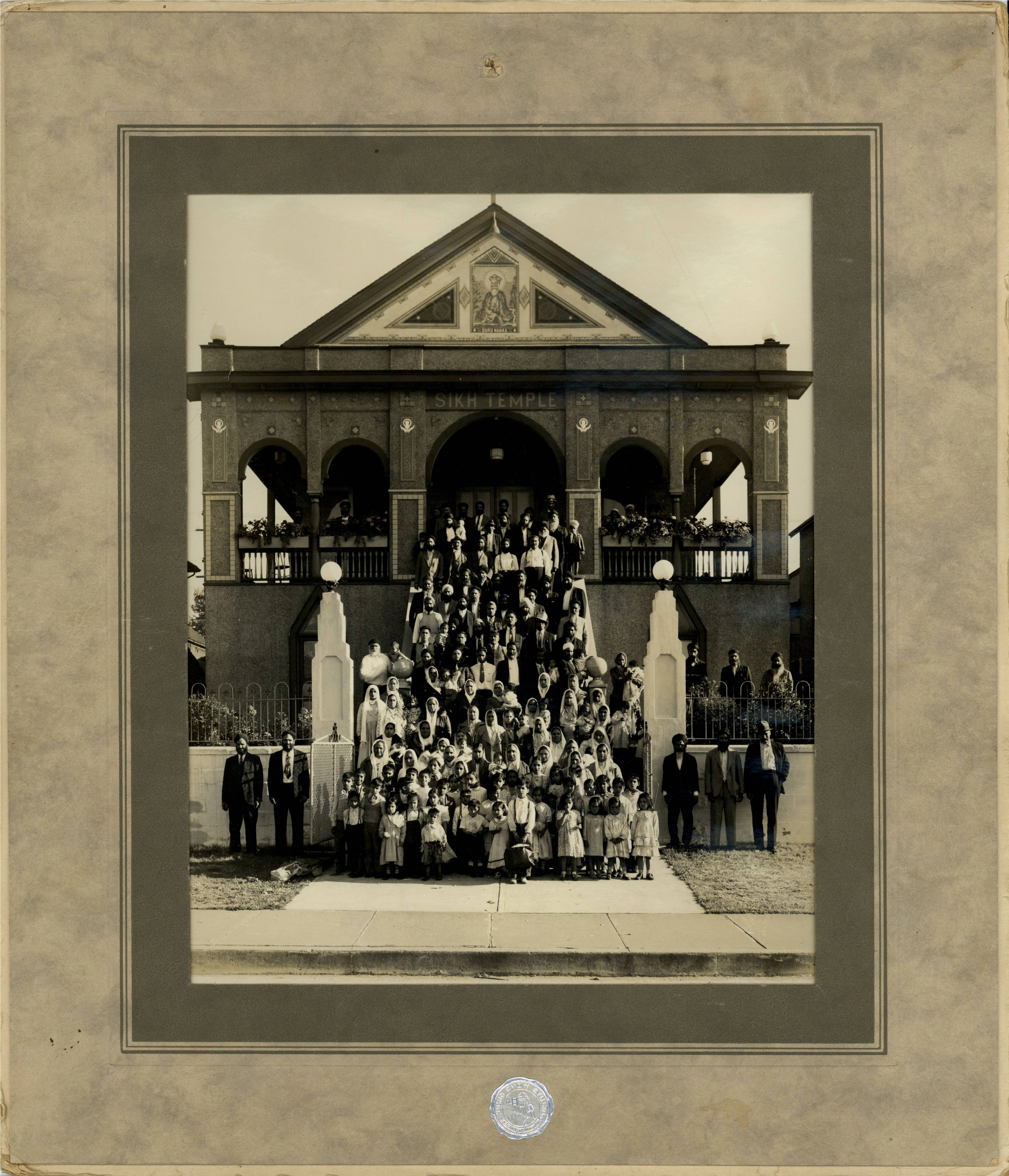
Kitsilano, Vancouver Sikh temple, 1910

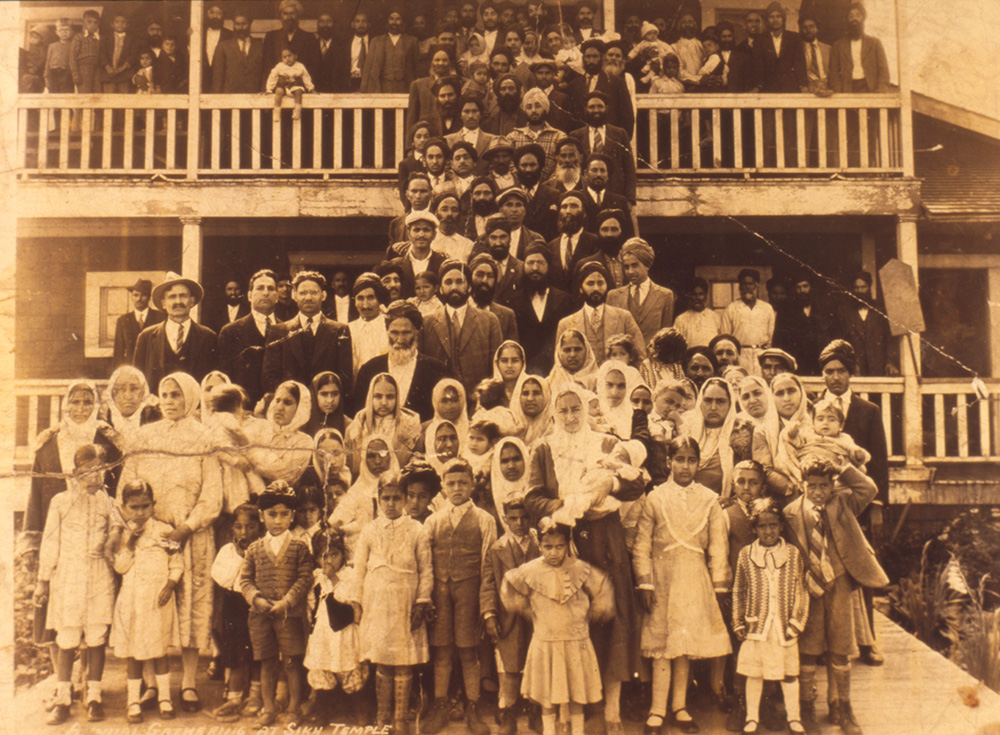
Queensborough, New Westminster Sikh temple, 1931.

=== Late 19th century ===
South Asians first settled in Vancouver in the late 19th century. The pioneers were men, mostly Sikhs from the Punjab region of British India. These individuals first arrived in 1897 when a contingent of Sikh soldiers participated in the parade to celebrate Queen Victoria's Diamond Jubilee by traveling across the British Empire. On their journey home, they passed through Vancouver where some remained as Canada's first South Asian settlers.

=== Early 20th century ===
By 1900, the South Asian population in the Lower Mainland (contemporary regional districts of Metro Vancouver and the Fraser Valley), was estimated to be at least 100, of which almost all were of Punjabi Sikh origin, according to a research article by Margaret Walton-Roberts.

Soon thereafter in 1904 the Empress of India arrived in Vancouver. On board was the first large contingent of South Asians to settle in Vancouver.

Most of the early South Asian pioneers worked in the sawmill industry and thus settled in areas along False Creek and the Fraser River including Kitsilano, Fraser Mills and Queensborough. A Gurdwara (Sikh temple) was constructed in Kitsilano in 1908; this was the first Sikh temple to be constructed in Canada. Later in the same year, another temple was constructed in Fraser Mills.

At the turn of the century the Mayor of Vancouver did not permit cremation, so when the first Sikh died in 1907 he could not be cremated in the Vancouver city limits. Christian missionaries did not permit him to be buried with whites. Even though the missionaries promoted burial, the Sikhs instead cremated the man in a distant wilderness. This prompted Sikhs to establish their own religious institutions. In 1908 the Canadian Dominion government had a plan to obtain labour for sugar plantations in British Honduras, now Belize, by recruiting Punjabis in Vancouver. The plan was not tested because the Punjabis had already found employment.

Anti-South Asian sentiment was present in early years of settlement. During the most infamous anti-Asian riot in BC history (Anti-Oriental Riots of 1907), South Asians were spared as they remained indoors. However, in 1914 Canadian authorities turned away the Komagata Maru and most of its passengers; this vessel carried Punjabi Sikhs, Muslims and Hindus who were intending to move to Canada. This incident later provoked persons of Indian origin residing on the North American West Coast to oppose discrimination against their ethnic groups.

The system of sponsoring Vancouver-based South Asians sponsoring relatives in India to immigrate to Vancouver began in 1919, when the Canadian government began permitting children and women based in India entry into Canada.

By 1923 Vancouver became the primary cultural, social, and religious centre of British Columbia Indo-Canadians and it had the largest East Indian-origin population of any city in North America. However, major immigration restrictions until the 1950s meant the South Asian community in Vancouver was relatively small.

=== Mid-20th century ===
After the partition of India in 1947, unity among Punjabi Sikhs and Muslims in Vancouver wavered; few Pakistani Punjabis began to have any sense of affinity with Punjabis from India.

The immigration patterns of South Asians arriving to Canada changed by the 1960s, with Ontario becoming a secondary centre of immigration. By contrast, in earlier decades British Columbia was the sole major point of immigration from the Indian subcontinent to Canada. In addition, the first major non-Sikh immigration wave to Vancouver occurred during the 1960s.

While still representing less than 10% of the South Asian population in the region, additional immigration to Vancouver of those of non Punjabi backgrounds residing in India, Fiji, and England occurred in the late 1960s. Immigration from Fiji continued to occur in the through the 1970s. Other groups immigrating to Vancouver in the same decade included Sri Lankans, Ismaili Muslims, Gujarati Hindus from East Africa and non-Punjabi Pakistanis. Soon, additional South Asian groups from Fiji, England, East Africa, East Asia, the Caribbean, and Southeast Asia arrived in Vancouver. However non Punjabi immigration to Vancouver remained small and by 1981 nearly 90% of the entire South Asian population in Vancouver remained Punjabi.

Punjabi Canadians were geographically dispersed throughout Vancouver during the post-war years into the early 1950s. Consequently, with increased immigration, concentrations soon developed; first in South Vancouver during the latter half of the 1950s and throughout the 1960s, followed by South Burnaby later in the 1960s. In the late 1960s, the Punjabi Market (Little India) was founded in the Sunset neighbourhood of South Vancouver. In the following decade, other Punjabi population concentrations began appearing in North Delta, Richmond, and Surrey. Vandalism against houses owned by Indo-Canadians and a Sikh gurdwara occurred in the 1970s, especially in 1974-1975 in Surrey. By 1981, the Punjabi population in Metro Vancouver increased to nearly 30,000, including about 2,288 Hindus with the remainder being Sikhs.

=== Late 20th century ===
Immigration rapidly increased in the late 20th century; around 70,000 South Asians moved to Vancouver during the last two decades of the century, from 1981 to 2001. In the same timeframe, India supplied just over three quarters of the total South Asian immigration to Vancouver. During this period the second largest source country of South Asians was Fiji, which supplied nearly 15% of South Asian immigration to Vancouver. Others originated from Bangladesh, Nepal, Pakistan, and Sri Lanka.

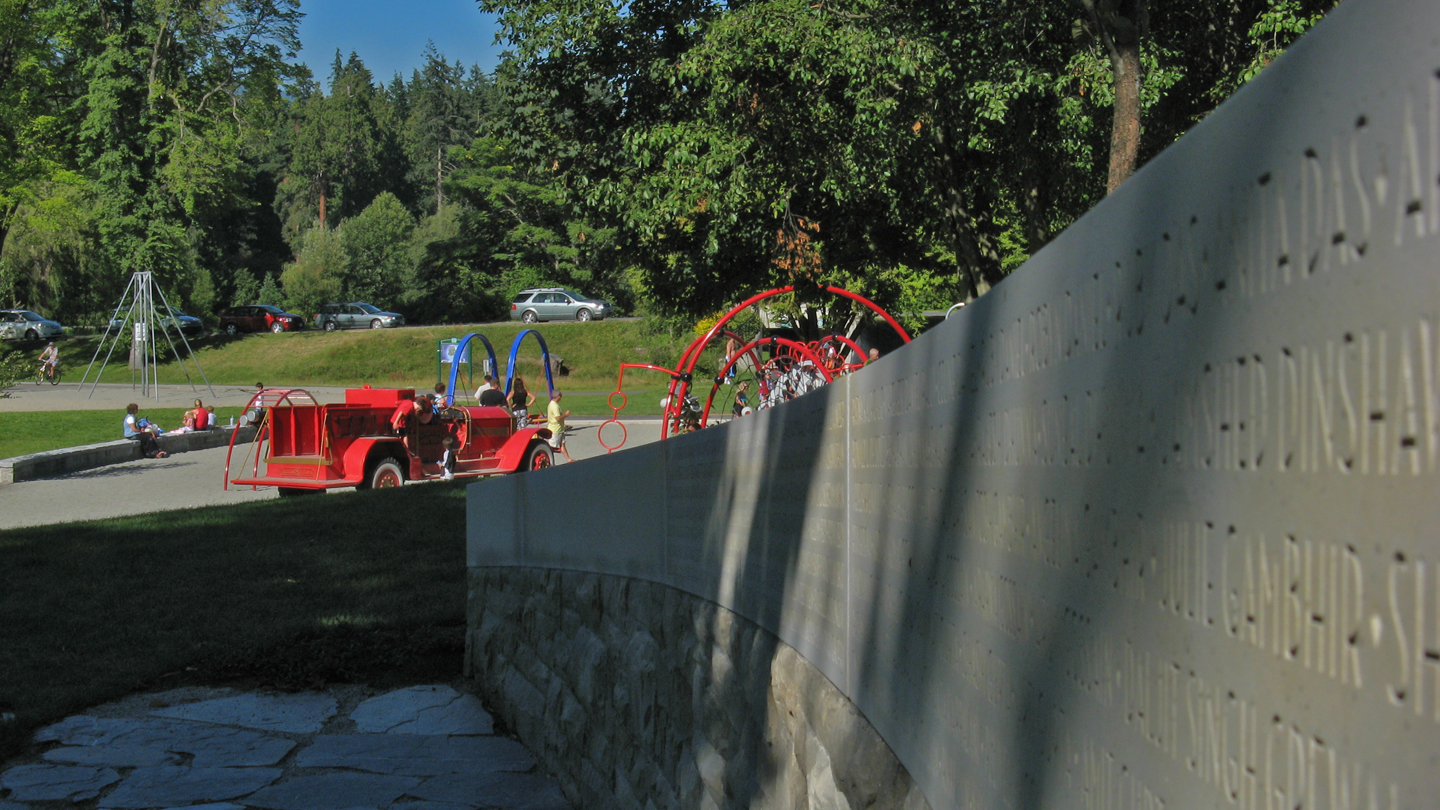
Air India Flight 182 memorial at Stanley Park

Some passengers on board Air India Flight 182, which crashed in 1985, were from Greater Vancouver. The bomb that went on AI182 was first placed on a connecting flight that departed Vancouver. Since then, there have been memorial services held at Stanley Park. The Ceperley Playground at Stanley Park has a memorial listing the names of the passengers.

By the mid-1980s wealthier South Asians were moving to Surrey from South Vancouver because land in Surrey was less expensive. The population continued to swell throughout the region thereafter; by 1991, the South Asian population grew to 86,200 in Metro Vancouver.

In 1996 a controversy occurred when Dr. Stephens, a doctor in San Jose, California, put advertisements for sex-selection services which would allow parents to reject female children. The Coalition of Women's Organizations Against Sex Selection, organized by Mahila, a women's group headquartered in Vancouver, criticized Stephens. In 2006 the Royal Canadian Mounted Police (RCMP) stated that there had been attempts to extort and kidnap people in Surrey; the RCMP did not disclose when the attempts occurred and who the targets were. The RCMP stated that businesspersons of Indo-Canadian origins in Surrey need to take precautions. In response, the president of Sikh Alliance Against Violence, Kandola, stated that the warning was too vague and could cause unnecessary panic and confusion.

=== 21st century ===
In August 2008, during a community meeting, the Prime Minister of Canada gave an apology for the Komagata Maru incident in a park, in Surrey. Some members of Canada's Indo-Canadian community argued that he should have apologized in Parliament.

In 2010 Charlie Smith, the editor of The Georgia Straight, criticized area news reports which stated that South Asians were disproportionately connected to gay bashings; Smith argued that it is not fair to lump all South Asians together and label them with the same description, citing the ethnic diversity within the community. He also cited the fact that no Indo-Canadian professionals were charged with any such crimes. He added "I doubt there is a single university graduate among the lot."

== Demography ==
=== Population ===
According to the 2021 Canadian census, there are approximately 370,000 South Asians in Metro Vancouver, representing 14.2% of the total population. Of them, based on 2016 census responses, 243,135 were East Indian, 30,670 were Punjabi, 10,820 were Pakistani, 7,200 were South Asian, n.i.e., 5,070 were Sri Lankan, 1,510 were Bangladeshi, 1,155 were Nepali, 1,055 were Tamil, 525 were Sinhalese, 755 were Bengali, 315 were Goan, 615 were Gujarati and 150 were Kashmiri.

South Asian Canadian population in Metro Vancouver (1961−2021)
Census year	Population	Percentage	Source(s)
1961 Canadian census	1,937	0.234%	
1971 Canadian census	10,750	0.993%	
1981 Canadian census	39,450	3.154%	
1986 Canadian census	51,975	3.815%	
1991 Canadian census	86,190	5.441%	
1996 Canadian census	125,355	6.911%	
2001 Canadian census	164,365	8.354%	
2006 Canadian census	207,165	9.875%	
2011 Canadian census	252,405	11.067%	
2016 Canadian census	291,005	11.994%	
2021 Canadian census	369,295	14.165%	

=== Ethnic origins ===
Presently, the majority of the South Asian population in Vancouver remains of Punjabi heritage, predominantly of the Sikh faith.

As of 2021, the Punjabi population in Metro Vancouver is 239,205, (Note: Statistic includes all speakers of the Punjabi language, as many multi-generation individuals do not speak the language as a mother tongue, but instead as a second or third language) representing approximately 9.2% of the total population. As of 2011, (Note: Last census with religion results.) 83 percent of Punjabis in Metro Vancouver were Sikh, with the remaining 17 percent being Hindu or Muslim.

The heavy concentration of Punjabis in Vancouver differs from the South Asian populations in Toronto and other central and eastern Canadian cities, as those groups have more balance and diversity in their South Asian linguistic groups.

Despite the large proportion of Punjabis in the region, the South Asian population in Vancouver nonetheless remains diverse; minority populations of Gujaratis, Bengalis, and individuals from South India as well as East African Ismailis, and Fijian Indians are present.

Punjabi population history in Metro Vancouver
Year	Pop.	±%
1986	31,255	—
1991	51,735	+65.5%
1996	79,760	+54.2%
2001	104,280	+30.7%
2006	137,415	+31.8%
2011	164,895	+20.0%
2016	187,530	+13.7%
2021	239,205	+27.6%
Source: Statistics Canada (Note: Census data on total language speakers began during the 1991 census. 1986 census is an estimate derived using the proportion of total Punjabi speakers to Punjabi mother tongue speakers from the 1991 census, which was approximately 1.5 times greater.)

Punjabi Proportion of the South Asian Population in Metro Vancouver (1986—2021)
Year	Proportion %
1986	60.13
1991	60.02
1996	63.63
2001	63.44
2006	66.33
2011	65.33
2016	64.44
2021	64.77

=== Language ===
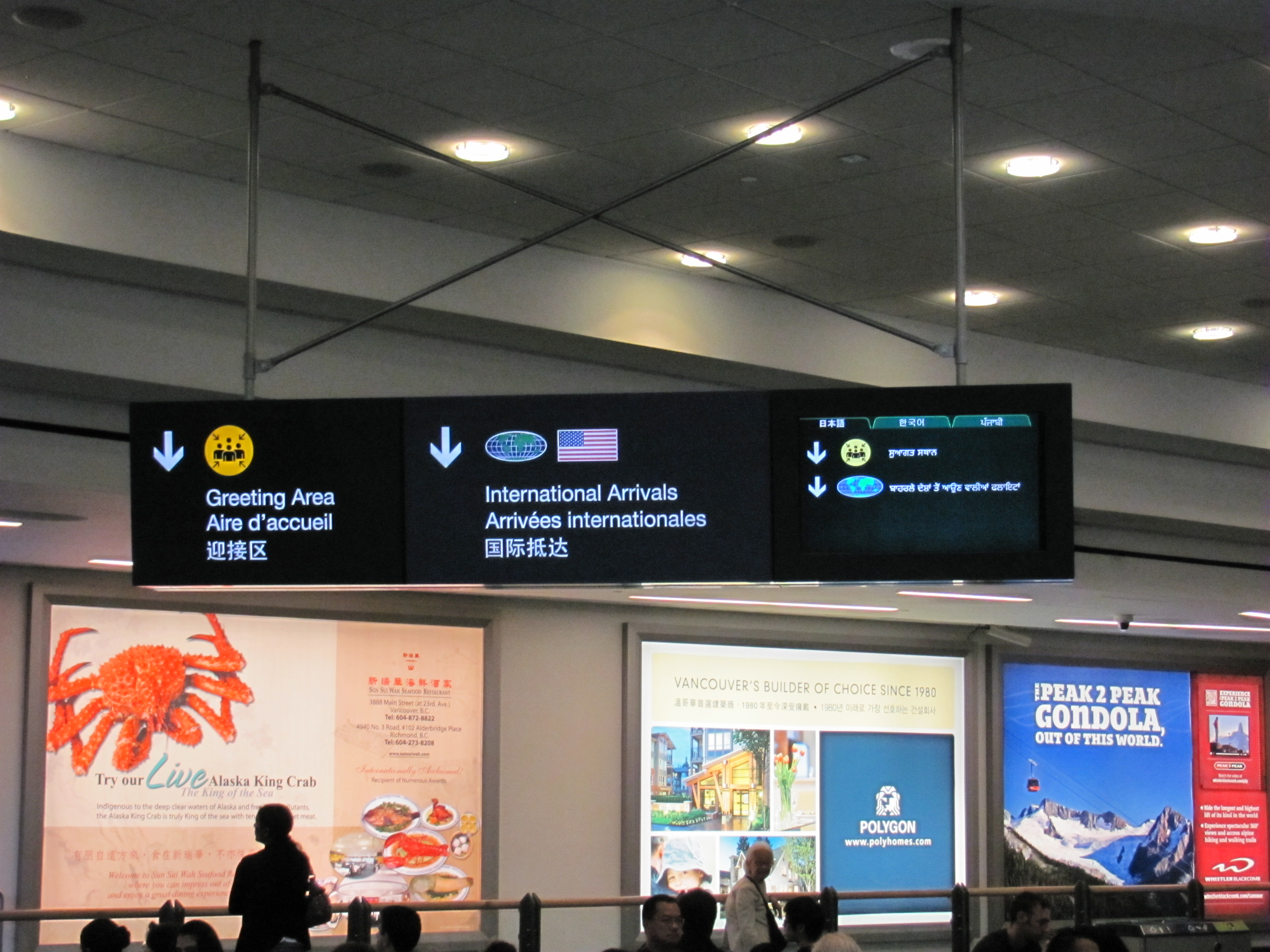
Gurmukhi language sign board at Vancouver International Airport

As of 2021, the most prominent South Asian languages spoken in Metro Vancouver include Punjabi, Hindustani (Hindi-Urdu) and Gujarati.

The Punjabi speaking population in Vancouver has witnessed large growth over recent decades. In 1986, around 30,000 individuals in Metro Vancouver spoke Punjabi; by 1991, this number grew to around 40,000.

As of 2021, Metro Vancouver has approximately 240,000 Punjabi speakers, accounting for roughly 9.2% of the region's total population. Punjabi is also the third most commonly spoken language across Metro Vancouver, after English and Mandarin.

Due to prominence of Punjabi in the region, the City of Vancouver, British Columbia, and Canadian federal institutions in Vancouver have literature and office signage using the Gurmukhi script. Of the Punjabi speakers in Canada, most are located in the Vancouver and Toronto areas (predominantly Surrey and Brampton).

==== Knowledge of language ====
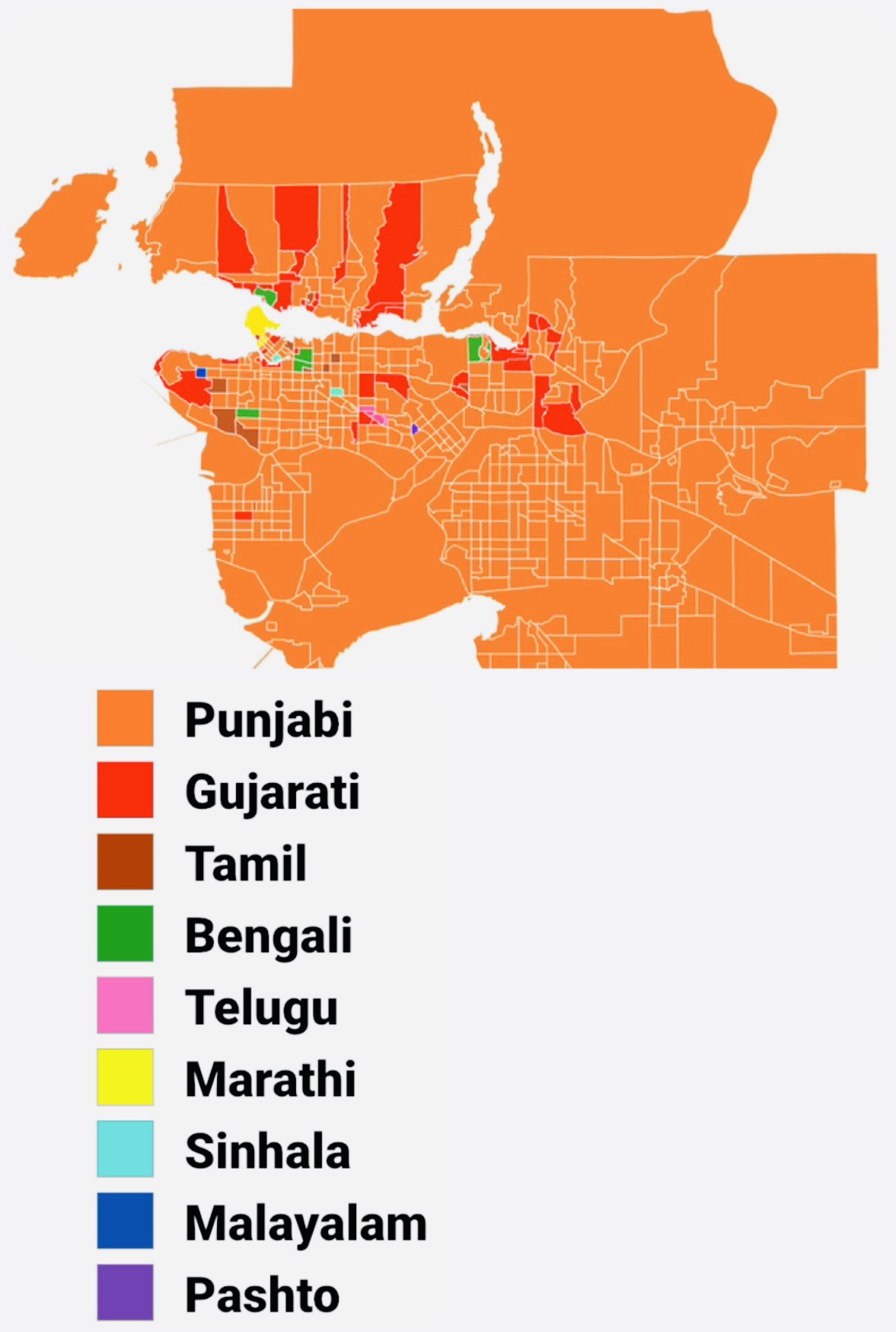
Largest South Asian language spoken (besides Hindustani) in Metro Vancouver by census tract, 2021 census

Many South Asian Canadians speak Canadian English or Canadian French as a first language, as many multi-generational individuals do not speak South Asian languages as a mother tongue, but instead may speak one or multiple (Note: The question on knowledge of languages allows for multiple responses.) as a second or third language.

Population (and % of population) of people who speak South Asian languages in Greater Vancouver (2021 census)
	Metro Vancouver		City of Vancouver		City of Surrey	
Total population	2,642,825 (100%)		662,248 (100%)		568,322 (100%)	
Number of responses	2,607,010 (98.64%)		650,380 (98.21%)		562,565 (98.99%)	
Indo-Aryan languages	317,790	12.19%	33,070	5.08%	196,220	34.88%
Punjabi	239,205	9.18%	19,130	2.94%	164,830	29.3%
Hindustani	132,450	5.08%	17,540	2.7%	72,790	12.94%
Hindi	110,485	4.24%	15,025	2.31%	61,500	10.93%
Urdu	21,965	0.84%	2,515	0.39%	11,290	2.01%
Gujarati	12,615	0.48%	1,835	0.28%	3,255	0.58%
Bengali	5,330	0.2%	1,675	0.26%	1,505	0.27%
Sinhala	3,040	0.12%	610	0.09%	1,270	0.23%
Marathi	2,930	0.11%	665	0.1%	665	0.12%
Kacchi	2,745	0.11%	410	0.06%	240	0.04%
Nepali	1,645	0.06%	325	0.05%	715	0.13%
Konkani	655	0.03%	150	0.02%	230	0.04%
Sindhi	505	0.02%	70	0.01%	175	0.03%
Kashmiri	140	0.01%	25	0%	25	0%
Oriya	140	0.01%	50	0.01%	60	0.01%
Assamese	95	0%	15	0%	30	0.01%
Rohingya	55	0%	0	0%	55	0.01%
Other	1,395	0.05%	250	0.04%	675	0.12%
Dravidian languages	16,585	0.64%	4,730	0.73%	5,155	0.92%
Tamil	8,440	0.32%	2,670	0.41%	2,465	0.44%
Malayalam	4,615	0.18%	965	0.15%	1,815	0.32%
Telugu	3,940	0.15%	1,110	0.17%	1,005	0.18%
Kannada	1,425	0.05%	330	0.05%	465	0.08%
Tulu	180	0.01%	50	0.01%	80	0.01%
Other	40	0%	10	0%	15	0%

==== Mother tongue ====
Population (and % of population) of people who speak South Asian languages and official languages as a mother tongue in Greater Vancouver (2021 census)
	Greater Vancouver		City of Vancouver		City of Surrey	
Population	2,619,425		654,825		564,230	
Indo-Aryan languages	277,875	(10.6%)	27,205	(4.2%)	177,375	(31.4%)
Punjabi	203,430	(7.8%)	15,435	(2.4%)	143,590	(25.5%)
Hindustani	52,370	(2.0%)	7,600	(1.2%)	27,180	(4.8%)
Hindi	38,620	(1.5%)	6,080	(0.9%)	19,680	(3.5%)
Urdu	13,340	(0.5%)	1,440	(0.2%)	7,300	(1.3%)
Gujarati	9,215	(0.4%)	1,390	(0.2%)	2,580	(0.5%)
Bengali	4,605	(0.2%)	1,295	(0.2%)	1,305	(0.2%)
Sinhala	1,985	(0.08%)	315	(0.05%)	880	(0.2%)
Marathi	1,840	(0.07%)	425	(0.06%)	435	(0.08%)
Kacchi	1,645	(0.06%)	255	(0.04%)	145	(0.03%)
Nepali	1,435	(0.05%)	245	(0.04%)	720	(0.1%)
Dravidian languages	13,495	(0.5%)	3,755	(0.6%)	4,210	(0.8%)
Tamil	5,830	(0.2%)	2,010	(0.3%)	1,645	(0.3%)
Malayalam	3,820	(0.2%)	690	(0.1%)	1,510	(0.3%)
Telugu	3,000	(0.1%)	830	(0.1%)	835	(0.2%)
Official languages	1,505,670	(57.5%)	377,865	(57.7%)	283,735	(50.3%)
English	1,468,760	(56.1%)	363,820	(55.6%)	279,030	(49.5%)
French	36,910	(1.4%)	14,045	(2.1%)	4,705	(0.8%)

=== Religion ===
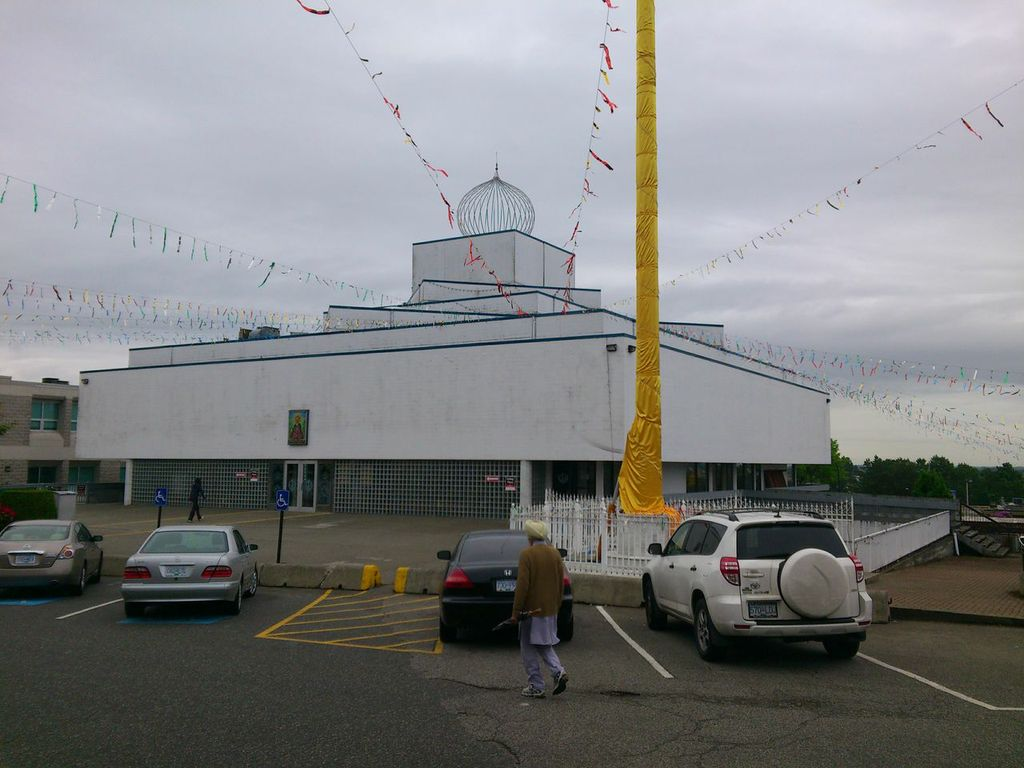
Khalsa Diwan Society Vancouver

The 1981 census stated that about 65% of the persons of South Asian origin in the Vancouver Census Metropolitan Area were Sikh. In addition, 20% were Hindu, and 15% belonged to other religions. The other religious groups included Buddhists, Christians, Jains, Muslims, and Zoroastrian Parsis. Ismailis were among the Muslims.

Religious affiliation of South Asian Canadians in Metro Vancouver (2001−2021)
Religious group	2021 Canadian census		2011 Canadian census		2001 Canadian census	
Religious group	Pop.	%	Pop.	%	Pop.	%
Sikhism	219,960	59.6%	154,200	61.1%	97,495	59.3%
Hinduism	62,065	16.8%	38,320	15.2%	26,220	16%
Islam	39,475	10.7%	29,490	11.7%	23,165	14.1%
Irreligion	27,665	7.5%	14,105	5.6%	6,095	3.7%
Christianity	15,830	4.3%	13,430	5.3%	9,665	5.9%
Buddhism	2,690	0.7%	1,665	0.7%	965	0.6%
Jainism	620	0.2%	—N/a	—N/a	85	0.05%
Zoroastrianism	430	0.1%	—N/a	—N/a	405	0.2%
Judaism	145	0.04%	100	0.04%	80	0.05%
Baháʼí	80	0.02%	—N/a	—N/a	25	0.02%
Indigenous spirituality	0	0%	—N/a	—N/a	85	0.05%
Other	330	0.1%	1,090	0.4%	75	0.05%
Total responses	369,290	100%	252,400	100%	164,360	100%
Total population	369,295	100%	252,405	100%	164,365	100%

==== Sikhism ====
Sikh population history in Metro Vancouver
Year	Pop.	±%
1981	22,390	—
1991	49,625	+121.6%
2001	99,005	+99.5%
2011	155,945	+57.5%
Source: Statistics Canada

Vancouver is home to Canada's most influential, oldest, and largest Sikh community. Until the 1960s Sikh religious organizations were the primary political interest groups of the Indo-Canadian community in the Vancouver region, and Sikh gurdwaras (Sikh temples) in Vancouver were the city's only community centres for the Indo-Canadians until the 1960s. This meant that the gurdwaras at the time also gave social outlets to Punjabi Hindus and Muslims along with other South Asians. By 1981, gurdwaras mainly filled religious purposes.

Many major gurdwaras in Greater Vancouver were initially established in isolated areas, but these areas over time became urbanized. As Vancouver has an extremely high proportion of Sikhs, being Punjabi in the region has come to mean, exclusively, being Sikh. While making up a majority of the Punjabi population in India and Pakistan, this definition has come to exclude Punjabi Muslims and Hindus who reside in Vancouver as a minority.

Sikhs are the largest non-Christian group in Metro Vancouver, with a population numbering 155,945 as of 2011, representing around 7% of the region's total population.

==== Hinduism ====
In the past, Hindus went to Sikh gurdwaras because they lacked their own Hindu temples. However, in 1972 Indo-Fijian Canadians established the first Hindu temple in Vancouver.

Historically there were ten times the number of Punjabi Sikhs compared to Punjabi Hindus. Around the 1970s Punjabi Hindus began having fewer interactions with Sikhs, and in general became more distant from Punjabi Sikhs, as they established their own Hindu religious organizations. This occurred as the Indo-Canadian community increased with more and more immigration. As of 1981 Vancouver had 6,865 Hindus, about one third of them ethnic Punjabis. As of 1988 there was no specific Punjabi Hindu organization in Greater Vancouver. Because the Gujarati society morphed into a Gujarati Hindu society, Gujarati Hindus had religious and social functions from both the Vishva Hindu Parishad, the primary Hindu temple in Vancouver, and from their ethnic society. As of 1988 the primary Hindu temple in the area was the Vishva Hindu Prasad, which in 1982 had about 500 members who paid dues.

In 1974 Vishva Hindu Prasad received its own building, a former community centre for an adjacent church. The temple building has a kitchen in the basement and the temple on the primary floor. Its worshipers include South Indians, Bengalis, Gujaratis, and Punjabis. Its primary language is Hindi; Hugh Johnston stated that this "has been an obstacle for the South Indians". The first head priest was an East African Punjabi who was of the Brahman caste and a part of Arya Samaj. A South Indian Vedantist priest began participating in 1981 after the first priest did not participate in a ceremony to install idols and, after a political struggle, resigned. Other temples included a Hare Krishna temple and the Shiv Mandir. Westerners supported the former and Fijians supported the latter.

As of the 2001 Statistics Canada there were 27,405 Hindus in Greater Vancouver.

==== Islam ====
As of 1988 the B.C. Muslim Association has a majority Fijian membership. The Pakistan Canada Association, according to Hugh Johnson, "have played a leading role in its affairs." By 1983 there was a mosque and community centre in Richmond and a mosque in Surrey controlled by this organization. The primary language used in the mosque is English. In addition to Indian Fijians and Punjabis, Arabs and other non-South Asian ethnic groups are a part of the mosque.

Originally Muslims participated in Sikh gurdwaras. After 1947 Indo-Canadian Muslims continued having a relationship with Sikhs but began referring to themselves as "Pakistanis" due to the Partition of India. The B.C. Muslim Association was established in 1966. Around the 1970s Punjabi Muslims began having fewer interactions with Sikhs, and in general became more distant from Punjabi Sikhs, as they established their own Muslim religious organizations. The movement of South Asian professionals of Pakistani national origins from other Canadian provinces into Vancouver caused existing Punjabi Muslims to move further away from Punjabi Sikhs. Immigration from several countries, including Fiji and Middle Eastern countries, increased the Indo-Canadian Sunni Muslim population. Several South Asian groups, including Indo-Fijians, together established one of the Vancouver area's first permanent mosques. There were 8,000 Muslims that were a part of the B.C. Muslim Association in 1983.

==== Christianity ====
As of 1997 there are eight Punjabi Christian churches in Greater Vancouver. In February 2014 the Punjabi Masihi Church had about 300 worshipers, most of them of South Asian origins. It was the first ever Punjabi Christian church to be established. Most of its services are held in English, while some are also in Hindi, Punjabi, and Urdu. It originally operated in an annex of the Delta Pentecostal Church in Delta. Construction on its standalone congregational building in Surrey began in 2008; initially, 9,500 square feet (880 m^{2}), it was scheduled to open in March of that year and there are further plans to build additions until the building has a total of 13,000 square feet (1,200 m^{2}). For Syro-Malabar Catholics, The Syro-Malabar Catholic Eparchy of Mississauga has a church, St. Alphonsa, located in Vancouver, with high attendance from the Malayali community in the region.

==== Other ====
Anand Jain, a person quoted in a 2006 Vancouver Sun article, stated that the Lower Mainland region may have around 60 Jain families.

== Geographical distribution ==
During the post-war era in the late 1940s and early 1950s, there was no particular residential concentration of South Asians in the Vancouver region. However, during the latter half of the 1950s and later, throughout the 1960s, many new immigrants began settling on the south slope within the city of Vancouver. This was due to the proximity of the gurdwara and the lumber mills. In the following decade, the Punjabi Market (Little India) was established within the Sunset neighbourhood of southeast Vancouver; the neighbourhood became the centre of Metro Vancouver's South Asian community by 1970. A secondary concentration soon also developed in the Edmonds neighbourhood of South Burnaby later in the 1970s. In the ensuing two decades, during the 1970s and 1980s, South Asians were located throughout Greater Vancouver and not only in South Vancouver and South Burnaby; about 66% of Indo-Canadians lived in Vancouver city while about 33% lived in Burnaby, Richmond, Surrey and other suburban cities.

Beginning in the 1990s, the majority of new immigrants from South Asia arriving to Metro Vancouver began moving directly to Surrey and Delta, primarily enticed by cheap housing on larger properties relative to the city of Vancouver. Part of a larger trend in large metropolitan areas across North America, new immigrants began to bypass traditional migration patterns to an inner-city enclave − at the time for South Asians in Metro Vancouver, the inner-city enclave was located in the Sunset neighbourhood − instead opting to migrate to suburban locales, leading to the creation of the Ethnoburb.

The pattern shift in South Asian immigration to Metro Vancouver began to alter the geographic distribution across the region. This was reflected in the shift of Punjabi speakers in the region; in 1991, only 20% of those who natively spoke Punjabi in Metro Vancouver lived in Surrey. In the ensuing two decades, by 2011, this number nearly completely reversed; nearly 60% of Punjabi speakers in Metro Vancouver were situated in Surrey. As of 2016, South Asians made up more than 32% of the Surrey population, and formed the largest visible minority group in the city. As many South Asians have moved to suburban areas such as Surrey, Delta and Coquitlam, the number of businesses in the Vancouver's Punjabi Market began to decline in the 2000s.

Of all Canadian municipalities, Surrey has the second-highest concentration of South Asians. Surrey includes many shopping centres, Gurdwaras, Mandirs and Masjids catering to the South Asians community. Surrey has been viewed as the South Asian equivalent of Richmond, which houses an equally large East Asian/Chinese population. Newton and Whalley are the two largest South Asian neighbourhoods in Surrey. As of 2011, South Asians made up 62.1% of the immigrants in Newton while the total number of immigrants made up over 40% of Newton's total population.

As of 2013, many younger Indo-Canadians are moving to areas in Vancouver and Burnaby close to their places of work instead of areas with concentrated Indo-Canadian populations. Also as of 2013, the city of Surrey began construction of a new "Little India" in Newton, with a plan to supersede the Punjabi Market in Vancouver. Construction was completed in 2016 with Little India fronting the intersection of 128th Street and 80th Avenue.

=== Subdivisions ===
South Asian Canadian population in Metro Vancouver by subdivision (1961–2021)
Subdivision	2021 Canadian census		2016 Canadian census		2011 Canadian census		2006 Canadian census		2001 Canadian census		1996 Canadian census		1991 Canadian census		1986 Canadian census		1981 Canadian census		1971 Canadian census		1961 Canadian census	
Subdivision	Pop.	%	Pop.	%	Pop.	%	Pop.	%	Pop.	%	Pop.	%	Pop.	%	Pop.	%	Pop.	%	Pop.	%	Pop.	%
Surrey	212,680	37.81%	168,040	32.85%	142,445	30.74%	107,810	27.47%	75,680	21.89%	50,680	16.74%	26,960	11.08%	9,100	5.05%	5,060	3.46%	505	0.51%	82	0.12%
Vancouver	44,850	6.9%	37,625	6.09%	35,755	6.06%	33,415	5.85%	30,655	5.68%	27,455	5.41%	25,395	5.46%	18,050	4.25%	16,060	3.94%	6,600	1.55%	1,106	0.29%
Delta	27,995	26.1%	20,485	20.31%	17,030	17.25%	14,215	14.8%	12,035	12.49%	8,450	8.92%	5,440	6.16%	3,395	4.29%	2,130	2.87%	305	0.67%	32	0.22%
Burnaby	23,160	9.43%	18,875	8.2%	17,480	7.94%	16,840	8.38%	14,960	7.82%	11,255	6.37%	8,740	5.59%	6,080	4.26%	4,400	3.29%	855	0.68%	104	0.1%
Richmond	15,365	7.37%	14,480	7.36%	14,875	7.86%	13,950	8.04%	12,115	7.41%	10,410	7.03%	9,150	7.26%	6,935	6.42%	4,960	5.18%	415	0.67%	128	0.3%
Langley Township	8,725	6.66%	5,140	4.44%	2,990	2.9%	1,535	1.65%	1,485	1.72%	875	1.1%	570	0.87%	800	1.51%	435	0.98%	20	0.09%	6	0.04%
New Westminster	8,105	10.38%	5,790	8.28%	5,640	8.66%	4,725	8.17%	4,220	7.84%	3,350	6.88%	1,700	3.99%	1,625	4.2%	1,350	3.63%	685	1.6%	212	0.63%
Coquitlam	7,405	5.02%	6,220	4.5%	5,285	4.23%	4,305	3.79%	3,285	2.95%	3,700	3.69%	2,120	2.57%	1,905	2.82%	1,435	2.43%	225 (Note: Including the subdivision of Fraser Mills, which would amalgamate with Coquitlam in 1971.)	0.42%	34	0.12%
Maple Ridge	4,245	4.72%	2,495	3.08%	1,890	2.52%	1,840	2.7%	1,375	2.2%	1,075	1.94%	600	1.25%	185	0.52%	180	0.57%	100	0.41%	21	0.13%
Port Coquitlam	3,485	5.77%	2,800	4.84%	2,815	5.05%	2,530	4.84%	2,285	4.5%	1,505	3.25%	1,230	3.37%	840	2.91%	565	2.07%	100	0.51%	8	0.1%
North Vancouver District	2,785	3.19%	3,345	3.94%	2,415	2.89%	2,630	3.21%	2,310	2.83%	2,340	2.93%	1,975	2.65%	1,490	2.2%	1,230	1.89%	300	0.52%	45	0.12%
North Vancouver City	2,100	3.65%	2,045	3.92%	1,700	3.57%	1,345	3%	975	2.22%	1,680	4.08%	915	2.4%	645	1.82%	730	2.17%	300	0.94%	61	0.26%
Langley City	1,965	7.01%	590	2.33%	355	1.45%	300	1.29%	145	0.62%	140	0.63%	160	0.82%	70	0.43%	70	0.47%	65	1.39%	3	0.13%
White Rock	1,570	7.58%	995	5.2%	425	2.29%	335	1.84%	170	0.98%	115	0.69%	75	0.48%	20	0.14%	70	0.54%	10	0.1%	2	0.03%
West Vancouver	1,405	3.24%	1,080	2.59%	1,070	2.54%	1,040	2.5%	835	2.04%	835	2.07%	455	1.19%	355	0.99%	365	1.04%	105	0.29%	42	0.17%
Pitt Meadows	1,020	5.36%	880	4.78%	945	5.34%	910	5.83%	795	5.42%	685	5.1%	485	4.36%	230	2.88%	140	2.25%	35	1.29%	14	0.64%
Port Moody	1,005	3%	800	2.39%	810	2.46%	825	3.01%	555	2.34%	395	1.9%	185	1.05%	190	1.21%	165	1.11%	55	0.51%	22	0.46%
Metro Vancouver A	990	5.8%	605	4.24%	465	3.75%	330	3.02%	435	5.57%	270	2.78%	75	1.11%	100	1.83%	110	2.07%	60	1.23%	15	0.28%
Tsawwassen	105	4.87%	10	1.33%	0	0%	0	0%	0	0%	0	0%	0	0%	0	0%	—N/a	—N/a	—N/a	—N/a	—N/a	—N/a
Capilano 5	90	3.1%	65	2.23%	40	1.5%	15	0.6%	15	0.67%	85	3.97%	35	1.86%	20	1.14%	0	0%	—N/a	—N/a	—N/a	—N/a
Anmore	70	2.92%	40	1.81%	0	0%	25	1.4%	0	0%	0	0%	0	0%	—N/a	—N/a	—N/a	—N/a	—N/a	—N/a	—N/a	—N/a
Burrard Inlet 3	65	2.74%	30	1.62%	30	2.04%	0	0%	0	0%	10	2.17%	0	0%	0	0%	0	0%	—N/a	—N/a	—N/a	—N/a
Musqueam 2	60	3.64%	60	3.64%	25	1.56%	40	2.92%	30	2.34%	20	1.45%	20	1.47%	15	1.21%	15	1.27%	—N/a	—N/a	—N/a	—N/a
Bowen Island	25	0.59%	70	1.91%	15	0.44%	30	0.89%	0	0%	—N/a	—N/a	—N/a	—N/a	—N/a	—N/a	—N/a	—N/a	—N/a	—N/a	—N/a	—N/a
Lions Bay	20	1.44%	15	1.08%	0	0%	0	0%	10	0.72%	10	0.74%	0	0%	0	0%	0	0%	0	0%	—N/a	—N/a
Belcarra	0	0%	10	1.68%	0	0%	10	1.48%	10	1.46%	0	0%	0	0%	0	0%	5	1.11%	—N/a	—N/a	—N/a	—N/a
Mission 1	0	0%	0	0%	0	0%	0	0%	0	0%	0	0%	0	0%	0	0%	0	0%	—N/a	—N/a	—N/a	—N/a
Matsqui 4	0	0%	0	0%	0	0%	0	0%	0	0%	0	0%	0	0%	0	0%	—N/a	—N/a	—N/a	—N/a	—N/a	—N/a
Katzie 1	0	0%	0	0%	0	0%	0	0%	0	0%	10	0%	0	0%	0	0%	0	0%	—N/a	—N/a	—N/a	—N/a
Seymour Creek 2	0	0%	0	0%	0	0%	0	0%	0	0%	0	0%	0	0%	—N/a	—N/a	—N/a	—N/a	—N/a	—N/a	—N/a	—N/a
Mcmillan Island 6	0	0%	0	0%	0	0%	0	0%	0	0%	0	0%	0	0%	—N/a	—N/a	—N/a	—N/a	—N/a	—N/a	—N/a	—N/a
Semiahmoo	0	0%	0	0%	0	0%	0	0%	0	0%	0	0%	0	0%	0	0%	0	0%	—N/a	—N/a	—N/a	—N/a
Coquitlam 1	0	0%	0	0%	—N/a	—N/a	—N/a	—N/a	—N/a	—N/a	—N/a	—N/a	—N/a	—N/a	—N/a	—N/a	—N/a	—N/a	—N/a	—N/a	—N/a	—N/a
Katzie 2	—N/a	—N/a	0	0%	—N/a	—N/a	—N/a	—N/a	—N/a	—N/a	—N/a	—N/a	—N/a	—N/a	—N/a	—N/a	—N/a	—N/a	—N/a	—N/a	—N/a	—N/a
Musqueam 4	—N/a	—N/a	—N/a	—N/a	—N/a	—N/a	—N/a	—N/a	—N/a	—N/a	—N/a	—N/a	—N/a	—N/a	—N/a	—N/a	—N/a	—N/a	—N/a	—N/a	—N/a	—N/a
Whonnock 1	—N/a	—N/a	—N/a	—N/a	—N/a	—N/a	—N/a	—N/a	—N/a	—N/a	—N/a	—N/a	—N/a	—N/a	—N/a	—N/a	—N/a	—N/a	—N/a	—N/a	—N/a	—N/a
Coquitlam 2	—N/a	—N/a	—N/a	—N/a	—N/a	—N/a	—N/a	—N/a	—N/a	—N/a	—N/a	—N/a	—N/a	—N/a	—N/a	—N/a	—N/a	—N/a	—N/a	—N/a	—N/a	—N/a
Barnston Island 3	—N/a	—N/a	—N/a	—N/a	—N/a	—N/a	0	0%	0	0%	—N/a	—N/a	—N/a	—N/a	—N/a	—N/a	—N/a	—N/a	—N/a	—N/a	—N/a	—N/a
Native Reserves	—N/a	—N/a	—N/a	—N/a	—N/a	—N/a	—N/a	—N/a	—N/a	—N/a	—N/a	—N/a	—N/a	—N/a	—N/a	—N/a	—N/a	—N/a	10	0.62%	0	0%
Metro Vancouver	369,295	14.17%	291,005	11.99%	252,405	11.07%	207,165	9.87%	164,365	8.35%	125,355	6.91%	86,190	5.44%	51,975	3.81%	39,450	3.15%	10,750	0.99%	1,937	0.23%

=== Federal electoral districts ===
As of 2021, South Asians form 14.2 percent of the total population of Metro Vancouver. However, the geographic distribution of South Asians varies greatly by federal electoral district, ranging from 3.4 percent of the total population of Vancouver East to 66.7 percent of the total population of Surrey—Newton.

Punjabi language street signs are visible in neighborhoods that have large numbers of South Asians.

South Asians by federal electoral districts in Metro Vancouver (2011–2021)
Riding	2021		2016		2011	
Riding	Population	Percentage	Population	Percentage	Population	Percentage
Surrey—Newton	80,820	66.73%	68,880	60.69%	61,635	59.01%
Surrey Centre	52,060	40.04%	41,515	35.06%	36,530	33.23%
Fleetwood—Port Kells	42,855	34.56%	34,870	30.1%	29,615	27.14%
Delta	28,100	25.68%	20,495	20.17%	17,035	17.13%
Cloverdale—Langley City	27,555	21.26%	16,520	14.13%	10,405	10.41%
Vancouver South	19,260	17.84%	17,655	17.43%	18,070	18.25%
South Surrey—White Rock	14,095	12.09%	8,640	8.55%	5,495	5.98%
New Westminster—Burnaby	13,970	11.34%	11,635	10.28%	11,360	10.64%
Burnaby South	12,705	10.66%	9,315	8.39%	8,645	8.3%
Langley—Aldergrove	10,950	8.34%	6,630	5.75%	3,885	3.83%
Steveston—Richmond East	10,125	9.95%	10,175	10.25%	10,135	10.54%
Vancouver Kingsway	7,810	7.29%	7,085	6.83%	6,955	6.85%
Vancouver Centre	6,275	5.04%	4,150	3.63%	2,990	2.96%
Coquitlam—Port Coquitlam	6,200	4.75%	5,135	4.19%	4,740	4.33%
Port Moody—Coquitlam	5,775	5.07%	4,675	4.26%	4,035	3.77%
Burnaby North—Seymour	5,315	4.94%	4,390	4.32%	3,670	3.7%
Pitt Meadows—Maple Ridge	5,260	4.82%	3,310	3.32%	2,730	2.93%
Richmond Centre	5,240	4.91%	4,190	4.3%	4,380	4.7%
Vancouver Granville	4,995	4.6%	3,330	3.26%	3,040	3.1%
North Vancouver	4,220	3.46%	4,105	3.6%	3,035	2.8%
Vancouver East	3,850	3.38%	2,760	2.51%	2,310	2.22%
Vancouver Quadra	3,705	3.46%	2,785	2.71%	2,175	2.17%
Note: Based on 2012 Canadian federal electoral redistribution riding boundaries.

== Holidays ==
=== Vaisakhi ===
One of the largest celebrated holiday festivals across Vancouver is Vaisakhi. The Vaisakhi parade takes place in Vancouver and Surrey every year, and is one of the largest outside of India. The British Columbian government recognized the parade in 2021. The Vancouver Vaisakhi parade draws over 200,000 visitors and is the largest festival in the city. The Surrey Vaisakhi Parade draws up to 500,000 visitors.

=== Diwali ===
Sikhs, Hindus, and Jains in the Vancouver area celebrate Diwali. Events related to Diwali are held in Vancouver and Surrey, including DiwaliFest, which was established in 2004 as "Vancouver Celebrates Diwali". Within the Lower Mainland region DiwaliFest is one of the largest such events.

=== Other ===
The Indian Summer Festival is held every year. Canadian Broadcasting Corporation (CBC) Vancouver sponsors the festival.

Several South Asian organizations, including religious and regional-based groups, manage celebrations and cultural events.

As of 1988 Bengali Hindus in the Vancouver area celebrate Durga Puja.

== Economy ==
As of 2010 many Indo-Canadians work as taxi drivers in Vancouver. Other Indo-Canadians have professional jobs and many also own their businesses. They are a community in diverse professions.

James G. Chadney, the author of the 1984 book The Sikhs of Vancouver, stated that "one knowledgeable informant" told him that due to "business purposes" many wealthy Vancouver Sikhs use their company or the name of their spouses to legally list their residences.

During the Indo-Canadian community's early history, many members worked in sawmills within the Vancouver city limits and in areas which would become suburbs in Greater Vancouver. They also opened firewood businesses. Indo-Canadians entered this sector because they were not permitted to enter several other occupations. By 1991 Indo-Canadians continued to be active in the wood business, and Indo-Canadian construction, wood processing, and distribution businesses opened by the 1980s. As of 1998 most of the businesses were located in Vancouver, North Delta, and Surrey. Within Greater Vancouver, about 2,300 men of South Asian heritage each worked in the construction and wood processing areas in 1991, and during the same year there were about 2,000 men of South Asian heritage working in the Greater Vancouver transportation sector.

According to Michael M. Ames and Joy Inglis, authors of "Conflict and Change in British Columbia Sikh Family Life," as of circa 1973–1974, within the Vancouver Lower Mainland area, about 20% of Sikhs are managers and foremen and about 80% work in semi-skilled or unskilled jobs; most of the latter are in the lumber sector. Others were accountants, importers, salespeople, shopkeepers, and truckers. Ames and Inglis stated that they got the supporting data from August 1951-December 1966 marriage records, as well as donor lists, at the Vancouver Khalsa Diwan Society temple.

In 2009 Judy Villeneuve, a member of the Surrey City Council, stated that the main developers of Surrey were the Indo-Canadians. By 2009 the City of Surrey had posted job advertisements in the Indo-Canadian Times.

=== Businesses ===
Indian restaurants in the Punjabi Market and other parts of the Vancouver area serve Indian food. The majority of Indo-Canadian restaurants focus on the cuisine of northern India. Fodors wrote that Vij's, a restaurant established by Vikram Vij that prepared Indian food with Canadian ingredients and produce, "shook up the Vancouver food scene" in the 1990s when it first opened. There are also many Indian restaurants in Surrey. In 2013 Alexandra Gill of The Globe and Mail wrote that in regards to area food critics the Indian restaurant scene was "a largely unknown dining landscape."

Other businesses operated by the South Asians, as of 1988, included automobile dealerships, contractors, insurance agencies, jewellers, real estate agencies, sari shops, sweet shops, and travel agencies.

In 1970 there were no specialized South Asian movie theatres in the Vancouver area; five of them appeared by 1977, and there was one more by 1980.

== Institutions ==
In 1988 Hugh Johnston wrote that "Vancouver's South Asian community was an unweildy entity without a great sense of common purpose" even before the 1984 assault at Amritsar, and that because of the Khalistan-related tensions there was no "effective umbrella organization" in existence. The National Organization of Canadians of Origins (NACOI) in India, founded in 1977, had a British Columbia chapter, but Shiromani Akali Dal Sikhs chose not to take part, and Khalsa Diwan Society extremist Sikhs hijacked the British Columbia chapter in 1985. The promotion of the multicultural policies in Canada in the mid-20th century also caused additional organizations, including those funded by governments and private entities, to be founded.

=== Associations ===
In 1947 the East Indian Canadian Citizens' Welfare Association (EICCWA) or the Canadian East Indian Welfare Association opened. It was officially not a part of any gurdwara. Members originated from both the Khalsa Diwan Society (KDS), a Sikh society which historically had de facto dominance in the organization; affiliates of the KDS; and the Akali Singh Society. The organization began taking political functions from the KDS. By 1961 it was the primary Vancouver-area organization representing Indo-Canadian interests. The organization avoided publicity to reduce chances of negative public attention while it promoted quotas for Indo-Canadian politicians. Hugh Johnson wrote that "resentment" sometimes resulted from the KDS's dominance. Dusenbery wrote that the organization, by taking the entire East Indian community into its scope, promoted the idea that "there exists a distinct "East Indian" ethno-cultural group sharing unique interests and activities" and therefore "implicitly accepted the Canadian view of social reality". Prior to the 1977 formation of the NACOI it was the sole pan-South Asian organization in Vancouver.

The Multilingual Orientation Service Association for Immigrant Communities (MOSAIC) serves newly arrived immigrants in the city of Vancouver and also is involved with social concerns. The organization Options serves immigrants, particularly adults, by providing referrals and resources; it is headquartered in Surrey. New immigrants in the Surrey and also Delta, particularly adults, receive services from the Surrey-Delta Immigrant Services Society.

A senior centre for Sikh persons in Surrey opened on November 29, 1994.

Issues related to employment and labour are handled by the Progressive Intercultural Community Services Society (PICS), which serves Vancouver and Surrey.

The Rainbow Project, an organization involved in health-related matters, is based in Surrey.

=== Ethnic and national organizations ===
As of 1988 there is no specific Punjabi ethnic organization in Greater Vancouver while there are dedicated ethnic organizations for the Bengalis, East Africans, Gujaratis, and South Indians. The Gujarati association became a Gujarati Hindu organization exclusively even though Hindus, Ismailis, and Parsis had worked to establish the organization; the post-1974 growth of Ismailis caused the focus of the organization to change.

As of 1988 there are about 700-800 members of the Pakistan Canada Association in Greater Vancouver, with most of them being ethnic Punjabi. English and Urdu are the organization's primary languages. The Pakistan Canada Association Centre serves as the hub of activity. The association organized in 1963, had about 200 members in the Vancouver area in 1983.

=== Cultural organizations ===
The youth committee Guru Nanak Sikh Gurdwara in Surrey established "Sikh Skillz," an Indo-Canadian arts organization that originally had a focus on music but later branched into television.

== Politics ==
As of 2011 three South Asian and East Asian-dominated "ridings" are in Greater Vancouver: Burnaby-Douglas, Newton-North Delta, and Vancouver South.

=== Vancouver ===
Until the 1960s Sikh religious organizations were the primary political interest groups of the Indo-Canadian community in the Vancouver region.

In 1973 Dr. Venkatachala Setty Pendakur, an Indo-Canadian, was the first visible minority elected to the Vancouver City Council. He served one term, which ended in 1974. He was defeated in his re-election campaign that year, and in 1985 there were no Indo-Canadians who had any elected positions in area municipal governments.

Irene Bloemraad, author of "Diversity and Elected Officials in the City of Vancouver," stated that the at-large voting system used by Vancouver makes it difficult to elect women and minorities, and that the council's majority White demographics were "probably" influenced by the original rationale of the at-large system, to "keep those with social democratic ideologies out of politics". The ward system was abolished in 1935. Charlie Smith of The Georgia Straight wrote in 2004 that from 1990 to 2004 there had been difficulty in having Indo-Canadians elected to City of Vancouver municipal positions. That year, the President of the Ross Street Sikh Temple, Jarnail Singh Bhandal, advocated for a ward voting system in the City of Vancouver so that Indo-Canadians and other ethnic minorities have more of a chance to be elected. During a 2004 failed election proposal to reinstitute the ward system in the City of Vancouver, the area with the highest concentration of Indo-Canadians mostly voted in favour of reestablishing it. In 2008 Kashmir Dhaliwal, a candidate for the Vision Vancouver council, stated that he had plans to legally challenge the at-will voting system. Dr. Lakhbir Singh, a candidate for the Vancouver School Board, criticized the at-large voting system, saying that it discriminates against Indo-Canadians and that he would join the legal challenge. Smith accused the voting community of Vancouver city of racism, saying that racism results in a lack of votes for South Asian candidates.

=== Surrey ===
The first Indo-Canadian elected to Surrey's city council was Tom Gill, who was elected in 2005.

In 2014 Barinder Rasode campaigned to be the Mayor of Surrey. Kalwinder "Kal" Dosanjh, a former Vancouver Police Department officer, joined One Surrey, Rasode's political party, and campaigned to be a member of the Surrey city council in 2014.

Kristin R. Good, the author of Municipalities and Multiculturalism: The Politics of Immigration in Toronto and Vancouver, stated in 2009 that Surrey's Indo-Canadian community was politically fragmented, including along religious lines.

In October 2014 a series of political campaign signs in Surrey showing South Asian candidates were vandalized. Signs belonging to Surrey First and SafeSurrey Coalition, two political parties, were defaced, with only names of Indo-Canadian candidates crossed out. Tom Gill accused racists of defacing the signs.

=== Other cities ===
In 2005 Bobby Singh won a position in the Richmond School Board.

Kamala Elizabeth Nayar, the author of The Punjabis in British Columbia: Location, Labour, First Nations, and Multiculturalism, wrote that compared to Indo-Canadian people who were born and raised in the Lower Mainland, Indo-Canadians born in Canada whose ancestors settled in rural areas of British Columbia, and who themselves live in Vancouver, "tended to assess Canada's policy of multiculturalism more critically".

== Culture ==
Nayar stated that third-generation Punjabis who have lived in Vancouver their whole lives have a positive opinion of multiculturalism while those who live in Vancouver but have lived outside of Vancouver before have ambivalence about it: they argue that multiculturalism can divide people while it can also protect culture.

Nayar uses the term "Punjabi Bubble" to refer to a common effect of Punjabis only associating with other Punjabis. This occurs in Greater Vancouver. Nayar stated that "The Vancouver Sikh community is more insulated from the mainstream" compared to small town British Columbia Sikhs.

An anonymous interviewee of Nayar, a woman in the third generation, stated "In Vancouver, there is pressure to live strictly according to the precepts in comparison to other places like in California." She referred to the practice of Sikhism.

As of 1988 many residents of rural Punjab, including children, women, and dependent older persons, were arriving in Vancouver due to the sponsorship of relatives. Relations among clans and the home village ancestry are major factors within the Vancouver Sikh community. Margaret Walton-Roberts, the author of "Embodied Global Flows: Immigration and Transnational Networks between British Columbia, Canada, and Punjab, India," wrote that there is a specific "spatial relationship" between the Greater Vancouver region and Doaba, a region of Punjab, to the point where Punjabi villagers recite the specific locations of their Canadian relatives.

Sher Vancouver, an Indo-Canadian LGBT support group, was founded in April 2008 by Alex Sangha, a resident of North Delta and a former resident of Surrey. Sher Vancouver has opposed antigay laws in India. The organization showcases South Asian LGBT culture in its Out and Proud Project.

=== Bhangra dance ===
The Vancouver Indo-Canadian community practices Bhangra dance and Bhangra music. In the 1960s and 1970s immigrants from the Punjab used Bhangra, as did 1980s area labour movements. Bhangra dancers and DJs both perform in the city. In 2014 Gurpreet Sian, an instructor at the Simon Fraser University (SFU) School for the Contemporary Arts, described Metro Vancouver as "the capital of bhangra outside of India" which has "the best bhangra dancers, schools and the best teams."

The City of Bhangra Festival is celebrated annually, involving Bhangra teams originating from throughout North America. Held in both Surrey and Vancouver and lasting for about ten days, it is hosted by the Vancouver International Bhangra Celebration Society (VIBC). The Museum of Vancouver put on a temporary exhibit about Bhangra, Bhangra.me: Vancouver’s Bhangra Story, from May 5, 2011 to October 23, 2011. guest curator Naveen Girn and curator of contemporary issues Vivian Gosselin, received the Canadian Museums Association's Award for Excellence. As of 2014 SFU is the only North American university that offers bhangra as a course for university credit. Sian, who also serves as the executive director of South Asian arts, as of 2014 serves as the class's instructor.

== Media ==
There is a variety of Indo-Canadian newspapers and magazines serving Greater Vancouver and the Lower Mainland. As of 1985 most of these publications were in Punjabi, while some were printed in English and Hindi. As of 2009, of all of the major ethnic categories in Vancouver the South Asians had the highest number of media products.

=== Newspapers ===
There are several South Asian newspapers in the Lower Mainland. There are several groups: The most popular and widely distributed is The Asian Star group which consists of The Asian Star and The Punjabi Star newspapers .The Asian Star group of newspapers is the only group run by professional with past experience in the publishing industry unlike all the other family run or religious group backed run newspapers, The Voice group, the largest and oldest in North America, which consists of the Indo-Canadian Voice Newspaper in English, Indo-Canadian Awaaz Newspaper in Punjabi, South Asian Link, Indo-Canadian Business Pages like yellow pages, Indo Canadian Construction Pages, and Punjabi Link. Other than this there is another group. The Indo-Canadian Times is a Punjabi-language weekly and is one of the country's largest. The Indo-Canadian Voice is an online English-language newspaper, where the editor is Rattan Mall, serving the Indo-Canadian community but also covering a wide range of British Columbia and other news. Mall had been a reporter for the Times of India from 1979 to 1990, for the Vancouver Sun in 1994, and The Province in 1996, and was an associate producer what CFMT-TV (now Omni) in Toronto in 1999 and 2000. Also of note are Apna Roots: South Asian Connection, which publishes in English, and Punjab di Awaaz/Voice of Punjab, which publishes in Punjabi. In 1985 other publications included Canadian Darpan, Link, Overseas Times, Ranjeet, and Sikh Samajar. As of 1996 gurdwaras and establishments in the Punjabi Market distribute Punjabi newspapers.

The Circular-i-Azadi began publication in 1906-1907. This made it the city's first Punjabi newspaper. As of 1971 there was a quarterly publication and a monthly publication, both in English, catering to South Asians.

A South Asian paper in New York established a subsidiary publication in Vancouver during the 1970s.

In 1980 there were three Punjabi newspapers published in Vancouver. Four Punjabi papers in the Vancouver area were established in the period 1972 to 1980. As of 1980 there were no newspapers published in other Indo-Pakistani languages in Greater Vancouver.

A Punjabi journalist established a new paper, published every two weeks (one fortnight) in Vancouver, in 1972. The Anglophone publication included South Asian-related news in Canada and news related to India. This paper's target audience included all South Asian groups.

The Sach Di Awaaz is a weekly newspaper headquartered in Surrey. As of 2011 Mickey Gill is the newspaper's publisher.

=== Radio ===
In 1971 the only South Asian-catered radio services included a one and one half hour radio program on Sunday morning and a one-hour program on Friday, both on the same radio station. As of 1985 CFRO and one other area radio station broadcast programs in Punjabi and Hindi.

The first fully Indo-Canadian radio station, Rim Jhim, was established in 1987. The founder, Shushma Datt, was born in Kenya and had previously worked in the BBC's London bureau. As of 2004 Rim Jhim's listeners are East Indians, particularly second-generation women. Rim Jhim caters to persons of all religious backgrounds and its programming discusses gender, health, and social concerns. Tristin Hopper of the National Post wrote that Datt was "widely acknowledged as the godmother of Indo-Canadian broadcasting in Canada."

As of 2004 the area had five radio stations broadcasting material in Punjabi: Rim Jhim, Gurbani Radio, Punjab Radio, Radio India, and Radio Punjabi Akashwani. All of them had talk show components and four of them played music from Bollywood films and other classical and religious music from South Asia. Datt started an AM radio station in 2005; she had attempted to create an AM radio station for 20 years. By 2014 it had gained its current name, Spice Radio.

RedFM 93.1 Vancouver, an Indo-Canadian radio station, has its offices in Surrey.

As of 2004 first and second generation Indo-Canadians are the audience of Gurbani Radio, which is pro-Khalistan. Gurbani Radio does not broadcast music, and it includes talk shows focusing on Sikh religious and religio-political matters.

Punjab Radio's clientele consisted of many first and second generation Indo-Canadians. Its programming discussed political, religious, and social concerns as well as Punjabi culture.

As of that year Radio India also has a clientele of first and second generation Indo-Canadians. Its shows discuss the culture, politics, and religion of India. Radio India's headquarters are in Surrey.

Radio Punjabi Akashwani's main audience was first and second generation Indo-Canadians. Its programming discussed political, religious, and social concerns and Punjabi culture.

==== Pirate radio ====
As of 2014 several "pirate radio" stations with transmitters in northern Washington state in the United States served the Indo-Canadian community in Greater Vancouver and the Lower Mainland. These stations, all of which had programming mostly in Punjabi, were Radio India; Radio Punjab Ltd., also headquartered in Surrey; and Sher-E-Punjab Radio Broadcasting Inc., headquartered in Richmond. These stations did not get licences from the Canadian Radio-television and Telecommunications Commission (CRTC), and so they avoided paying copyright tariffs and licence fees and complying with rules regarding the station's content. Radio stations on the Canadian side had complained about the US-based pirates, saying that they unfairly received funds from advertising.

The CRTC decided to act against the pirate stations in 2014, after they had operated for years. Radio India initially stated that it had political connections; Managing director Maninder Gill had mailed photographs of himself socializing with Canadian politicians. In a presentation in October of that year Maninder Gill said that the station was going to be shut down and asked the CRTC to give him 120 days to make the shutdown; he mentioned the connections to politicians in the same presentation. The CRTC ultimately decided that the deadline to close Radio India was Midnight Pacific time on November 14, 2014. The CRTC guaranteed the closure of Radio Punjab and Sher-E-Punjab by getting compliance agreements. The details of these agreements were not disclosed to the public.

=== Television ===
Channel Punjabi programs are broadcast in the Vancouver area.

Sikh Skillz produces "Onkar TV," which is the only English-language Sikh television show made in Canada. In 2013 its third season began.

As of 2004 Now TV, the Shaw multicultural channel, and Vision broadcast shows aimed at Indo-Canadians.

In 1985 there was a Vancouver area cable television station that screened movies from India.

== Education ==
Dedar Sihota, who immigrated to Canada in 1936 and was educated at the University of British Columbia, was the first Indo-Canadian teacher in British Columbia. He began working at Renfrew Elementary School in Vancouver. He worked at Lord Tweedsmuir Senior Secondary School, going from teacher to vice principal. He then became a principal, working at three elementary schools. He retired in 1986.

=== Public schools ===
As of 1982 the Vancouver School Board's (VSB) elementary and primary schools had 2,086 Punjabi native speakers, 526 Hindi native speakers, 123 Gujarati native speakers, 17 Urdu native speakers, and 134 native speakers of other Indo-Pakistani languages. Hugh Johnston wrote that some of the students who indicated Hindi was their primary language may have been ethnic Punjabis. As of 1973, the public schools Southern Slope area of Vancouver had the highest concentration of East Indians.

As of 2008 about 1,000 Surrey Schools students were enrolled in Punjabi classes. Other Greater Vancouver school districts offering Punjabi classes included the VSB and the Richmond School District. British Columbia schools began offering Punjabi education in 1996. As of 1985 none of the school districts in Greater Vancouver offered any classes in Indian languages as part of their standard curricula; British Columbia school systems began offering Punjabi language classes in their 5th grade through 12th grade standard curricula in 1996.

By 1993 the VSB had hired Punjabi-speaking home-school employees, and there were after-school Punjabi classes held on VSB campuses.

Circa 1989 a research team took a sample of opinions of 135 Indo-Canadian parents at the VSB. The team determined that over 85% of the sample size expressed a belief that the school system respected the identity of their children. The remainder believed that the system did not respect the identity of their children or were not sure about the question. The study was done in regards to the VSB's race relations policies.

=== Private schools ===
The Vancouver Khalsa School, which opened in 1986, is a K-10 day school. It offers Punjabi language classes and Sikh religious instruction, along with standard British Columbia curriculum. Newton Campus, which opened in 1992, is in Surrey. The Old Yale Road Campus, also in Surrey, opened in 2008. The school began leasing from the VSB after a 2009 fire destroyed the school's original site. In 2012 the VSB stated that it was not going to renew the school's lease. In 2013 the Vancouver Khalsa School had 200 students in Preschool-Grade 7. That year, the VSB stated that the B.C. Khalsa School was going to have to vacate South Hill Education Centre site.

In 2008 Sikh Academy opened a private day school program for grades PreK-7. The campus is in Surrey.

=== Post-secondary education ===
The University of British Columbia (UBC) offers Punjabi classes. This is the oldest Punjabi language education program in British Columbia. Kwantlen Polytechnic University also offers Punjabi classes.

=== Language education ===
As of 1985 several area institutions offer education in the Indian languages to area children: in addition to the Khalsa School, institutions that offered Punjabi language instruction included the Heritage Language School, which was held on Saturdays within the campus of a Vancouver high school, and several Sikh temples in Vancouver, Surrey, and New Westminster.

=== Educational demographics ===
A survey conducted in 1980 selected random households from a Vancouver Sikh gurdwara; 602 households were documented. According to the survey, there was no spoken English fluency in 37% of people who arrived between 1961 and 1974 and 42% of people who arrived between 1975 and 1980. The same survey concluded that 65% of the male household heads and almost 80% of the wives of these household heads, while in India, had no education after ages 16 or 17. In other words they never had tertiary education.

== Recreation ==
The Indo-Canadian Tournaments Association and the United Summer Soccer League, under the United Summer Soccer Association, manage Indo-Canadian-oriented youth soccer. The association stated that each tournament-playing team of girls under 14 and boys under the ages of 13 or 14 may have up to four "imports" or non-Indo-Canadian players, while other teams may have up to two "imports". One parent of a team banned from the league for having too many "imports" criticized the practice in 2012.

== Crime ==
By 2009, the Indo-Canadian communities of Greater Vancouver had encountered gang violence among their young males.

Bindy Johal was a prominent figure in the organized crime world. As a result of the gang wars, over 100 men of South Asian origins were murdered in a period from the mid-1990s until 2012. Between 1992 and 2002 at least 50 people died. Greater Vancouver had a peak in gang violence in the mid-2000s. The Indo-Canadian males involved in the gangs often originated from affluent families. In 2002 Scott Driemel of the Vancouver Police Department had requested cooperation from the Indo-Canadian community; until that point there had been little cooperation between Indo-Canadians and the city police.

One gang originally was active at the Sunset Community Centre had the name Sunset Boys. This gang morphed into the Independent Soldiers (IS). The Canadian Broadcasting Corporation stated that IS "brought together Indo-Canadian gangsters in southeast Vancouver" around 2001.

Baljit Sangra directed the 2008 film Warrior Boyz which documents Indo-Canadian gangs in Greater Vancouver. This film had its premiere at the DOXA Documentary Film Festival in Vancouver. This documentary is a production of the National Film Board of Canada. The documentary A Warrior's Religion, directed by Mani Amar, is also about Indo-Canadian gangs in Vancouver. It was screened in Surrey.

Surrey author Ranj Dhaliwal wrote the Daaku series of novels about crime within the Indo-Canadian community.

R. K. Pruthi, author of Sikhism And Indian Civilization, wrote that Vancouver was the centre of the Khalistan movement's militant activities in Canada but that the movement did not only conduct militant activities in Vancouver.

== Relations with mainstream society ==
In the period 1905 to 1914, the Vancouver Daily World and Vancouver Province both negatively portrayed the South Asian immigrants. Doreen M. Indra, author of "South Asian Stereotypes in the Vancouver Press," wrote that the newspapers' view was that South Asians were "intrinsically dirty and unsanitary" people who were "both physically and morally polluting."

By the 1920s and 1930s, the newspapers still maintained a belief that, as stated by Indra, the South Asians had "negative cultural practices" and "deviant behavior", but the papers did not have a large amount of focus and did not put importance on the idea of South Asians being a social issue, partly because South Asians, who had received the right to have family members come to Canada, did not start outright activism during that period. In addition, there were only a small number of South Asians, and the media perceived India as being distant from Canada.

In 1979 Indra wrote that despite the increase in political influence and immigration of South Asians, and despite an increase in "normal" news coverage of South Asian celebrities, the mainstream newspapers continued to characterize South Asians as being outside of mainstream Canadian society and that the papers continued to associate South Asians with deviancy. Indra added that the Vancouver Sun had more positive news coverage of other ethnic groups.

== Research ==
James Gaylord Chadney wrote the 1984 book The Sikhs of Vancouver, which is based on a late 1970s study of how the Sikh community of Vancouver retained its familial and social aspects and changed its economic character as it became a part of the wider Canadian community. Kamala Elizabeth Nayar wrote The Sikh Diaspora in Vancouver, which studied the development of the Sikh community in Vancouver. Nayar also wrote The Punjabis in British Columbia: Location, Labour, First Nations, and Multiculturalism.

== Notable residents ==
- Ranj Dhaliwal — novelist
- Ujjal Dosanjh — former Premier of British Columbia
- Dave Hayer — Canadian politician
- Tara Singh Hayer — Canadian journalist
- Kash Heed — politician
- Irshad Manji — writer of East African Indian heritage
- Harjit Sajjan — Federal Liberal MP & Minister of National Defense
- Renée Sarojini Saklikar — poet
- Alex Sangha — social worker and documentary film producer and founder of Sher Vancouver
- Moe Sihota — politician & broadcaster
- Jagmeet Singh — Federal NDP leader
- Teja Singh — professor and creator of the Guru Nanak Mining and Trust Company
- Ratana Stephens — co-founder and CEO of Nature's Path

== See also ==
- South Asian Canadians in the Greater Toronto Area
- Bangladeshi British Columbians
- Demographics of Vancouver
- South Asian Canadians in British Columbia
- Indo-Canadian organized crime
- Khalistan movement § Canada

== Sources ==
- Bloemraad, Irene. "Diversity and Elected Officials in the City of Vancouver" (Chapter 2). In: Andrew, Caroline, John Biles, Myer Siemiatycki, and Erin Tolley (editors). Electing a Diverse Canada: The Representation of Immigrants, Minorities, and Women. UBC Press, July 1, 2009. ISBN 0774858583, 9780774858588. Start p. 46.
- Campbell, Michael Graeme. 1977. The Sikhs of Vancouver: A Case Study in Minority-Host Relations (M.A. thesis) (Archive), Political Science Department, University of British Columbia, Vancouver. Profile at the UBC
- Chadney, James Gaylord. The Sikhs of Vancouver (Issue 1 of Immigrant communities & ethnic minorities in the United States & Canada, ISSN 0749-5951). New York: AMS Press. 1984. ISBN 0404194036, 9780404194031. See snippet view at Google Books.
- Chadney, James Gaylord. 1980. "Sikh Family Patterns and Ethnic Adaptation in Vancouver". In Amerasia, Vol. 7: 1. p. 31-50.
- Dusenbery, Verne A. 1981. "Canadian Ideology and Public Policy: The Impact on Vancouver Sikh Ethnic and Religious Adaptation". In Canadian Ethnic Studies, Vol. 13: 3, Winter.
- Fair, C. Christine (University of Chicago) 1996. "Female Foeticide among Vancouver Sikhs: Recontextualising Sex Selection in the North American Diaspora" (" (Archive). In International Journal of Punjab Studies, Vol. 3:1.
- Hans, Raj Kumar. 2003. "Gurdwara as a Cultural Site of Punjabi Community in British Columbia, 1905 – 1965." In Fractured Identity: The Indian Diaspora in Canada, Sushma J. Varma & Radhika Seshan (eds.). Jaipur: Rawat Publications.
- Indra, Doreen M. 1979. "South Asian Stereotypes in the Vancouver Press". In Ethnic and Racial Studies, Vol 2:2. - doi:10.1080/01419870.1979.9993261
- Ironside, Linda L. Chinese- and Indo-Canadian elites in greater Vancouver : their views on education (Master's thesis) (Archive). Simon Fraser University. 1985. See profile at Simon Fraser University.
- Johnston, Hugh. 1988. "The Development of Punjabi Community in Vancouver since 1961". In Canadian Ethnic Studies, Vol. 20:2.
- Nayar, Kamala Elizabeth. The Punjabis in British Columbia: Location, Labour, First Nations, and Multiculturalism (McGill-Queen's studies in ethnic history: Series 2). McGill-Queen's Press (MQUP), October 1, 2012. ISBN 0773540709, 9780773540705.
- Nayar, Kamala Elizabeth. The Sikh Diaspora in Vancouver: Three Generations Amid Tradition, Modernity, and Multiculturalism. University of Toronto Press, 2004. ISBN 0802086314, 9780802086310.
- Nayar, Kamala Elizabeth. "The Making of Sikh Space: The Role of the Gurdwara" (Chapter 2). In: DeVries, Larry, Don Baker, and Dan Overmyer. Asian Religions in British Columbia (Asian Religions and Society Series). UBC Press, January 1, 2011. ISBN 0774859423, 9780774859424. Start: p. 43.
- Nayar, Kamala Elizabeth, "Misunderstood in the Diaspora: The Experience of Orthodox Sikhs in Vancouver." Sikh Formations 4, No. 1 2008), p. 17-32. - doi:10.1080/17448720802075397
- Nodwell, Evelyn. ""Integrating Indian Culture into our Life": The Construction of (East) "Indian Culture" in Vancouver, British Columbia, Canada" (" (Archive) (PhD thesis). University of British Columbia, 1993. - See record at University of British Columbia. See record at ResearchGate.
- Nodwell, Evelyn and Neil Guppy. "The effects of publicly displayed ethnicity on interpersonal discrimination: Indo-Canadians in Vancouver." The Canadian Review of Sociology and Anthropology, Feb, 1992, Vol.29(1), p. 87(13)
- Sumartojo, Widyarini. “My kind of Brown”: Indo-Canadian youth identity and belonging in Greater Vancouver (PhD thesis) (Archive). Simon Fraser University, 2012. See profile at Simon Fraser University.
- Walton, Margaret Winifred. "Indo-Canadian Residential Construction Entrepreneurs in Vancouver: An Examination of the Interface Between Culture and Economy" (master's thesis) (" (master's thesis) (Archive). University of British Columbia, 1996. See profile at UBC.
- Walton-Roberts, Margaret. 1998. "Three Readings of the Turban: Sikh Identity in Greater Vancouver" (" (Archive). In Urban Geography, Vol. 19: 4, June. - DOI 10.2747/0272-3638.19.4.311 - Available at Academia.edu and at ResearchGate.
- Walton-Roberts, Margaret and Daniel Hiebert. "Immigration, Entrepreneurship, and the Family: Indo-Canadian Enterprise in the Construction Industry of Greater Vancouver" (" (Archive). Research on Immigration and Integration in the Metropolis (RIIM), University of British Columbia. Canadian Journal of Regional Science. 1997. p. 119-140.
