= The Sikh Diaspora in Vancouver =

2004 book by Kamala Elizabeth Nayar

The Sikh Diaspora in Vancouver: Three Generations Amid Tradition, Modernity, and Multiculturalism is a 2004 book by Kamala Elizabeth Nayar published by the University of Toronto Press. The book discusses three generations of the Sikh diaspora, a subset of the Indo-Canadians, in Greater Vancouver.

== Background ==
Nayar is a sociologist, and was an employee of Kwantlen University College. As part of her research she conducted about 100 interviews, some in Punjabi and some in English, using a semi-structured format. Nayar interviewed 80 Sikhs living in Vancouver, including first, second, and third generation individuals. Most of the interview subjects originated from families who arrived in Canada in the late 1960s and early 1970s. Nayar also interviewed six persons who are considered to be public figures and twelve professionals. In addition she analyzed religious texts and other documents. Nayar originally intended to chronicle assimilation, but as she conducted the interviews she decided to shift focus to generational differences.

The author states that members of the public, Sikhs, and social scientists were the intended audiences, with the first group including counselors, educators, policymakers, and social workers. Verne A. Dusenbery of Hamline University wrote that in regards to the Sikhs, the only group that would "fully appreciate" the book's thesis would be the third generation and that this was based on the book's own arguments.

Her source on literacy and orality is a work by Walter J. Ong, Orality and Literacy: The Technologizing of the World. Her sources on modernity are a work by Talcott Parsons and Edward A. Shils, Toward a General Theory of Action, and a work by Alex Inkeles, One World Emerging? Convergence and Divergence in Industrial Societies.

== Content ==
The first chapter discusses the initial immigration, while the second chapter discusses differences in the methods of communication used by the different generations. There is also a chapter specifically about the history of Sikhism.

The book emphasizes the present and often repeats key points; Patricia E. Roy of the University of Victoria stated that these traits are a "sometimes textbook-like style". Dusenbery wrote that the "words of advice and admonitions" throughout the book were intended for the wider public.

Nayar argues that that "interaction between tradition and modernity" is the root of intergenerational conflict in the Vancouver Sikh community. The book has a perspective opposed to Canada's multiculturalism policy. Several second generation persons interviewed by Nayar argued that the multiculturalism policy encourages racism. The third generation interviewees are critical of aspects of Canadian Sikh culture, and they argued that the multicultural policy isolates them into a "Punjabi Bubble". Nayar herself argued that the policy prevents the Sikhs from becoming a part of mainstream Canadian society. Dusenbery described Nayar as "a sympathetic advocate for the "modern" and "integrative aspirations" of the third generation Punjabi Sikhs.

== Reception ==
Mandeep Kaur Basran, a professor of the Department of Sociology of the University of Saskatchewan, wrote that the book has "refreshing arguments" and that it complements The Sikhs in Canada: Migration: Race, Class, and Gender by Gurcharn S. Basran and B. Singh Bolaria.

Dusenbery argued that Nayar's analysis may incorrectly make recent Punjabi Sikh immigrants "stand-ins for all immigrants from "traditional," "agricultural," or "preliterate" societies, who presumably experience the same problems of "adaptation to modernity."" Despite that reservation, Dusenbery wrote that persons in Punjabi and Sikh studies should find the book "worth reading".

Connie Ellsberg of Northern Virginia Community College concluded that the book "provides an interesting view of three generations’ experience of the North American environment".

Doris R. Jakobsh of Canadian Literature wrote that the book tries to inappropriately place members of the three generations of Sikhs "into the "blueprint" offered" without accounting for individuals who differ from the "blueprint," and she stated that "Nayar's framework delineating communication patterns of the three generations of Canadian Sikhs tends to be rather too rigidly established, to the point of prototyping". She also stated The Sikh Diaspora in Vancouver did not give "due consideration" to "the centrality of Sikh women's role and status in Canadian society". Despite the criticisms, Jakobsh concluded it "is without doubt an important and highly sophisticated contribution in its unique approach to the study of Sikhs in Canada" that "articulates and chronicles important and, in many cases, heretofore unheard voices from within the Sikh community."

Roy stated that the book is "a good, clear introduction to the Sikhs" and a "provocative commentary on multiculturalism" that "can profitably be read by historians today."

Roy Todd of the University of Leeds concluded that the book was "a richly detailed interpretation of a community here but the theoretical framing and the analysis of the evidence leads to questions about alternative interpretations." Todd stated that the author did not make her research role clear, used methodologies that had some faults, and had an "uncritical dependence upon the dichotomy between tradition and modernity". In regards to the methodologies Todd stated that Nayar did not give enough details about the interview questions, and that she did not give a "precise quantitative analysis" of answers and instead only used "crude tallies" to present results of the interviews.

== See also ==
- Sikhism in Greater Vancouver
- Indo-Canadians in Greater Vancouver
- The Punjabis in British Columbia
