= KARI (AM) =

Christian radio station in Blaine, Washington

- Blaine, Washington; United States
- Broadcast area: Greater Vancouver, British Columbia; Northwest Washington
- Frequency: 550 kHz
- Branding: Word Radio

Programming
- Format: Christian talk and teaching

Ownership
- Owner: Multicultural Broadcasting; (Way Broadcasting Licensee, LLC)
- Sister stations: KVRI, KXPA

History
- First air date: February 12, 1960; 66 years ago

Technical information
- Licensing authority: FCC
- Facility ID: 5351
- Class: B
- Power: 5,000 watts day 2,500 watts night
- Translator: 95.7 K239CY (Blaine)

Links
- Public license information: Public file; LMS
- Webcast: Listen Live
- Website: www.kari55.com

KARI (550 kHz, "Word Radio") is a commercial AM radio station in Blaine, Washington, United States, and serving Vancouver, British Columbia, and Northwest Washington state. It broadcasts a Christian talk and teaching radio format and is owned by Multicultural Broadcasting.

The transmitter is on Tracy Lane in Blaine, only a few miles from the Canada–United States border. KARI broadcasts with 5,000 watts by day and 2,500 watts at night, using a directional antenna pointed at the Greater Vancouver radio market. For listeners in Blaine, the station has a 45-watt FM translator at 95.7 MHz, K239CY.

The station has a brokered programming plan, where national and local preachers buy time on the station and may seek donations to their ministries during their shows. Programs include "Let the Bible Speak" with Ian Goligher, Focus on the Family, Grace to You, In Touch Ministries, Turning Point and Thru the Bible Radio.

== History ==
On October 1, 1956, George A. Wilson and L. N. Ostrander, doing business as the Birch Bay Broadcasting Company, filed an application for a construction permit to build a new 500-watt, daytime-only radio station in Blaine, originally specifying 930 kHz. It was dismissed, amended to specify 550 kHz, and reinstated in late 1957; a hearing examiner recommended its approval in 1958 as the first radio service for Blaine despite causing some minor interference to KVI, and the FCC granted the permit on June 18, 1959.

From a site on a field near Birch Bay, overlooking Drayton Harbor and White Rock, British Columbia, KARI debuted on February 12, 1960.

Soon after starting up, KARI filed to go full-time and increase power to 5,000 watts daytime and 1,000 watts nighttime. This was approved by the FCC in two steps: the daytime authorization in May 1963 and nighttime service in January 1964. On August 1, the improved facility was activated. Birch Bay Broadcasting was also busy expanding its service. In 1962, it obtained a construction permit to build an FM station on Orcas Island, which went on the air as KERI in July 1965.

From its first day on air, KARI (pronounced "carry") carried "an abundance of religious programs". This made it a new offering to the vast majority of the listeners in its service area, across the border on Vancouver Island and the Lower Mainland of British Columbia; Canada did not permit religious radio stations until the mid-1990s. Within a year of starting up, KARI was a full-time religious station, a format it continues to maintain. In addition to U.S. public affairs programming, it catered to the Canadian listener base by airing Canadian newscasts.

In 2000, after 40 years of ownership, Birch Bay sold KARI to Way Broadcasting, a subsidiary of Multicultural Broadcasting, for $3 million. The sale also included an unbuilt construction permit for a station at 1600 kHz.
