= KVRI =

Radio station in Blaine, Washington, serving Vancouver, British Columbia

Coordinates: 48°57′14.4″N 122°44′40.6″W

- Blaine, Washington; United States
- Broadcast area: Metro Vancouver
- Frequency: 1600 kHz
- Branding: Radio Punjab

Programming
- Format: South Asian (Hindi, Punjabi and other languages)

Ownership
- Owner: Multicultural Broadcasting; (Way Broadcasting Licensee, LLC)
- Sister stations: KARI, KXPA

History
- First air date: January 1, 2001
- Call sign meaning: Vancouver Radio India

Technical information
- Licensing authority: FCC
- Facility ID: 5350
- Class: B
- Power: 50,000 watts (day); 10,000 watts (night)
- Translator: 105.3 K287CI (Blaine)

Links
- Public license information: Public file; LMS
- Website: radiopunjab.com

KVRI (1600 AM) (branded as Radio Punjab) is a commercial radio station licensed to Blaine, Washington, United States, and serving adjacent Greater Vancouver. Owned by Multicultural Broadcasting, it airs a format of Bollywood music and talk in Hindi, Punjabi and other South Asian languages.

By day, KVRI transmits 50,000 watts (the maximum for commercial AM stations), but to protect other stations on 1600 AM from interference, at night power is reduced to 10,000 watts. KVRI uses a directional antenna with a six-tower array, directing the signal to the northwest to cover Greater Vancouver. The transmitter is on Tracy Place in Birch Bay, Washington, about 4 miles (6.4 km) from the Canada–US border. Programming is also heard on FM translator K287CI on 105.3 MHz in Blaine.

== History ==
The station signed on the air on January 1, 2001. The station has always had the call sign KVRI and has always been owned by Multicultural Broadcasting, headed by broadcasting executive Arthur Liu. The original studios were on Lincoln Road in Blaine.

For many years, the station was operated by Radio India Ltd., a radio service with its offices in Surrey, a city in Greater Vancouver. Maninder S. Gill serves as the managing director. His sister, Baljit Bains, is the owner. Maninder Gill is the brother of the mother-in-law of Tom Gill, a Surrey city councillor. Robert Matas of The Globe and Mail described Maninder Gill as "a prominent figure" of Vancouver's Indo-Canadian community.

Radio India has a clientele of first and second generation Indo-Canadians. Its shows discuss the culture, politics, and religions of India. In 2014, Gill stated that the annual advertising revenue was $2 million to $3 million.

Logo as Radio India

On August 3, 2010, building contractor Harjit Atwal and two associates of Harjit Atwal, Jaspal Atwal and Harkirat Kular, filed a lawsuit against Maninder Gill, 11 other employees, and the radio firm itself, accusing the channel of having defamatory material about them on a Punjabi-language broadcast aired on Radio India in May of that year. This lawsuit was filed in the British Columbia Supreme Court.

Violent altercations involving the lawsuit and disputes occurred in August and September of that year. Maninder Gill faced five criminal charges after Harjit Atwal sustained gunshot injuries to his leg during a wedding held at the Guru Nanak Sikh Temple in Surrey; the police accused Gill of being responsible for the shooting. A drive-by shooting occurred at Maninder Gill's residence the following month. Maninder Gill stated that the conflict resulted from political differences regarding the Khalistan movement.

The station was operating under a LMA with Radio India, Ltd., and was broadcasting from its studios in Surrey, British Columbia until November 13, 2014, when the CRTC forced Radio India to end the LMA due to rules that prohibit a Canadian company from operating, leasing, or owning, a radio or television property in the United States solely for broadcasting to Canadians, and for operating without a license within Canada.

For years, Radio India operated as a "pirate radio" station which did not get a license from the Canadian Radio-television and Telecommunications Commission (CRTC); therefore it avoided paying copyright tariffs and license fees and complying with rules regarding the station's content. The CRTC decided to act against the pirate stations in 2014. Radio India initially stated that it had political connections; Managing director Maninder Gill had mailed photographs of himself socializing with Canadian politicians. In a presentation in October of that year, Maninder Gill said that the station was going to be shut down and asked the CRTC to give him 120 days to make the shutdown; he mentioned the connections to politicians in the same presentation. The CRTC ultimately decided that the deadline to close Radio India was Midnight Pacific time on November 14, 2014.

== See also ==
- Indo-Canadians in Greater Vancouver
