= CKYE-FM =

Multicultural radio station in Vancouver

- Vancouver, British Columbia; Canada
- Broadcast area: Greater Vancouver
- Frequency: 93.1 MHz
- Branding: Red FM

Programming
- Format: Multicultural

Ownership
- Owner: South Asian Broadcasting Corporation

History
- First air date: December 21, 2005

Technical information
- Class: C
- Power: 4,200 watts (average); 8,000 watts (peak)
- HAAT: 600 metres (2,000 ft)
- Transmitter coordinates: 49.354252°N 122.958308°W
- Repeater: Surrey: CKYE-FM-1 89.1 MHz (250 watts)

Links
- Webcast: Listen Live
- Website: vancouver.redfm.ca

CKYE-FM (93.1 MHz) is a commercial FM radio station in Vancouver, British Columbia. It airs a multicultural format and is owned by the South Asian Broadcasting Corporation. CKYE-FM has an effective radiated power of up to 8,000 watts from a transmitter on Mount Seymour. Its studios are located in Surrey. CKYE-FM uses the moniker Red FM with Red standing for "Reflecting Ethnic Diversity".

== Programming ==
Most of the weekday schedule is made up of programs in Punjabi, Hindi and Urdu. Weekends feature those languages as well as shows in Polish, Russian, Hungarian, Tagalog (Filipino), Persian, Fijian, Gujarati, Malayalam, Twi, Swahili, Spanish and Tamil.

== History ==
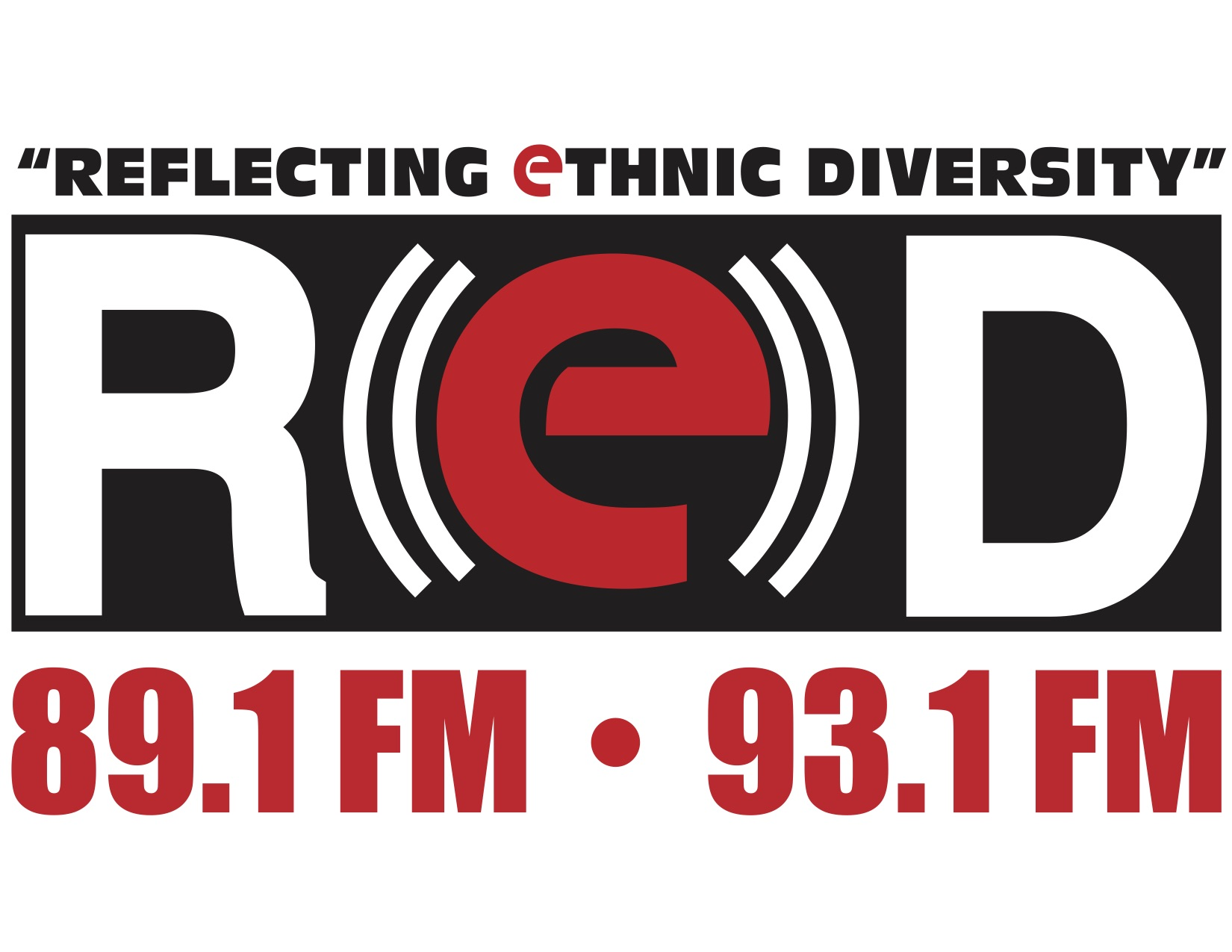
Original logo

Initial approval for a new ethnic radio station in Vancouver was granted on 21 July 2005 by the Canadian Radio-television and Telecommunications Commission (CRTC). The station signed on the air on February 1, 2006.

CKYE-FM was originally licensed to broadcast with an average effective radiated power of 2,800 watts, which was increased to 4,200 watts on 21 December 2005. Terms of the licence included a stipulation that 90% of all programming in each broadcast week must be ethnic in nature. The station is required to provide programming in at least 15 different languages, targeted at no less than 15 different ethnic groups. 75% of this programming must be in the Punjabi, Hindi, and Urdu languages.

In 2011, radio show host Harjinder Thind and other participants discussed domestic violence, with Thind saying "Recently women have taken many leaps forward to gain freedom with the help of men. Is this freedom becoming the reason behind domestic violence?" In response, the Surrey Women's Centre criticized the remark, stating it would be reported to the Canadian Radio-television and Telecommunications Commission.

== See also ==
- Indo-Canadians in Greater Vancouver
