= CJRJ =

Multicultural radio station in Vancouver

- Vancouver, British Columbia; Canada
- Broadcast area: Greater Vancouver
- Frequency: 1200 kHz
- Branding: Spice Radio

Programming
- Format: Multicultural

Ownership
- Owner: I.T. Productions Ltd.

History
- First air date: November 25, 2006
- Call sign meaning: Rim Jhim

Technical information
- Class: B
- Power: 25,000 watts
- Transmitter coordinates: 49.183767°N 123.062333°W

Links
- Website: spiceradio.net

CJRJ (identified on air and in print as Spice Radio) is a Canadian radio station based in Vancouver, British Columbia. It broadcasts at 1200 AM with a power of 25,000 watts from a transmitter in Richmond, and its studio is located in Burnaby. The station is owned by I.T. Productions Ltd., which is owned by Shushma Datt.

Logo used as RJ1200, November 2006-September 2014.

Initial approval for a new ethnic radio station was granted on 21 July 2005 by the Canadian Radio-television and Telecommunications Commission to serve the South Asian community in the Vancouver area. The station was licensed to broadcast with a power of 25,000 watts. Terms of the license included a stipulation that all programming in each broadcast week must be ethnic in nature. The station is required to provide programming in at least 17 different languages, targeted at no less than 11 different ethnic groups, with 95% of this programming to be in "third languages". 73% of this programming must be in the Punjabi and Hindustani languages. An additional term of the license, as per an intervention by Fairchild Radio Group (CJVB-AM, CHKG-FM Vancouver), is that CJRJ will not target Vancouver's Chinese community.

The station's sister station, Rim Jhim, continues to operate on the subsidiary communications multiplex operation (SCMO) subcarrier of CJJR-FM.

== Programming ==
CJRJ's programming is primarily South Asian (Hindi and Punjabi), however it also airs some Bengali, Gujarati, Filipino, Italian, Malayalam, Persian, Tamil, Sinhala and Korean programming on weekends.

== See also ==
- Indo-Canadians in Greater Vancouver
