= KRPI =

Radio station in Ferndale, Washington

- Ferndale, Washington; United States
- Broadcast area: Metro Vancouver
- Frequency: 1550 kHz
- Branding: KRPI Radio

Programming
- Format: South Asian (Hindi, Punjabi and other languages)

Ownership
- Owner: BBC Broadcasting, Inc.

History
- First air date: May 1963
- Former call signs: KOQT (1963–1984); KNTR (1984–1998); KCCF (1998–2002)
- Call sign meaning: from Radio Punjabi

Technical information
- Licensing authority: FCC
- Facility ID: 21416
- Class: B
- Power: 50,000 watts (day); 10,000 watts (night)
- Transmitter coordinates: 48°50′35.00″N 122°36′5.00″W

Links
- Public license information: Public file; LMS
- Webcast: https://listen.streamon.fm/ckspam
- Website: https://www.sherepunjabradio.ca/

KRPI (1550 AM) is a commercial radio station licensed to Ferndale, Washington, United States, and broadcasts a format of news, talk and Bollywood music in Hindi, Punjabi and other South Asian languages for listeners in Metro Vancouver. KRPI is owned by BBC Broadcasting, Inc.

KRPI's transmitter is sited on Imhoff Road in Ferndale, about 10 miles (16 km) from the Canada–United States border.

== History ==
The station signed on the air in May 1963. The original call sign was KOQT. It was a daytimer, with 1,000 watts and was required to go off the air at night. Power was increased in 1976 to 10,000 watts day and night, using a directional antenna after sunset, from a new transmitter site. The call letters were switched to KNTR on August 13, 1984. For a time, the station broadcast a Christian radio format.

On October 22, 1998, the station changed its call sign to KCCF. On August 9, 2002, it changed callsigns to the current KRPI.

Previously carried from 2004-2020 Sher-E-Punjab, 2001-2004 Radio Punjab, 1994-2001 Apna Sangeet. It formerly carried Baptist programming and Commonwealth Club of California. Apna Sangeet was formed by Sukhdev Singh Dhillon in 1994. In 2001, Apna Sangeet became Radio Punjab International. In 2004, Radio Punjab accused rival Sher-E-Punjab of broadcasting on its AM 1550 frequency. After legal struggles, Radio Punjab moved to a different AM frequency. Sher-E-Punjab took over Radio Punjab.

On May 24, 2012, KRPI received a construction permit from the Federal Communications Commission (FCC) to change its city of license from Ferndale to Point Roberts, Washington, and to increase its nighttime power to 50,000 watts. This move was meant to improve reception in Metro Vancouver. The move to Point Roberts attracted concerns from residents of Point Roberts and the adjacent community of Tsawwassen, British Columbia, citing potential interference with electronic devices and health concerns. The transmitter move did not happen and the station remains in Ferndale.

== See also ==
- Indo-Canadians in Greater Vancouver
