= The Punjabis in British Columbia =

2012 book by Kamala Elizabeth Nayar

The Punjabis in British Columbia: Location, Labour, First Nations, and Multiculturalism
- First edition cover
- Author: Kamala Elizabeth Nayar
- Language: English
- Publisher: McGill-Queen’s University Press
- Publication date: 2012
- Publication place: Canada

The Punjabis in British Columbia: Location, Labour, First Nations, and Multiculturalism is a 2012 book by Kamala Elizabeth Nayar, published by the McGill-Queen’s University Press (MQUP). The book discusses Punjabi immigrants to northern British Columbia in the period after World War II, and several chapters have a focus on the Punjabis of Skeena Country. The book has information on the female Punjabi experience. The book also discusses anti-Punjabi sentiments found in the First Nations peoples of British Columbia.

Anne Murphy of the University of British Columbia (UBC) wrote that the book has "substantive" criticisms of the uses and extent of Canada's multiculturalism policies.

== Reception ==
Michaela Pontellini of the Vancouver Weekly wrote that "I truly enjoyed this book" and that due to the large amount of detail inside, "I would not recommend it to anyone looking for some light reading." McGill-Queen's University Press described, “The Punjabis in British Columbia illustrates the complex and diverse experiences of an immigrant community that merits greater attention.”

== See also ==
- Indo-Canadians in British Columbia
- The Sikh Diaspora in Vancouver
