= Vancouver special =

Mass-produced home design popular in Vancouver, Canada in 1960s-1980s

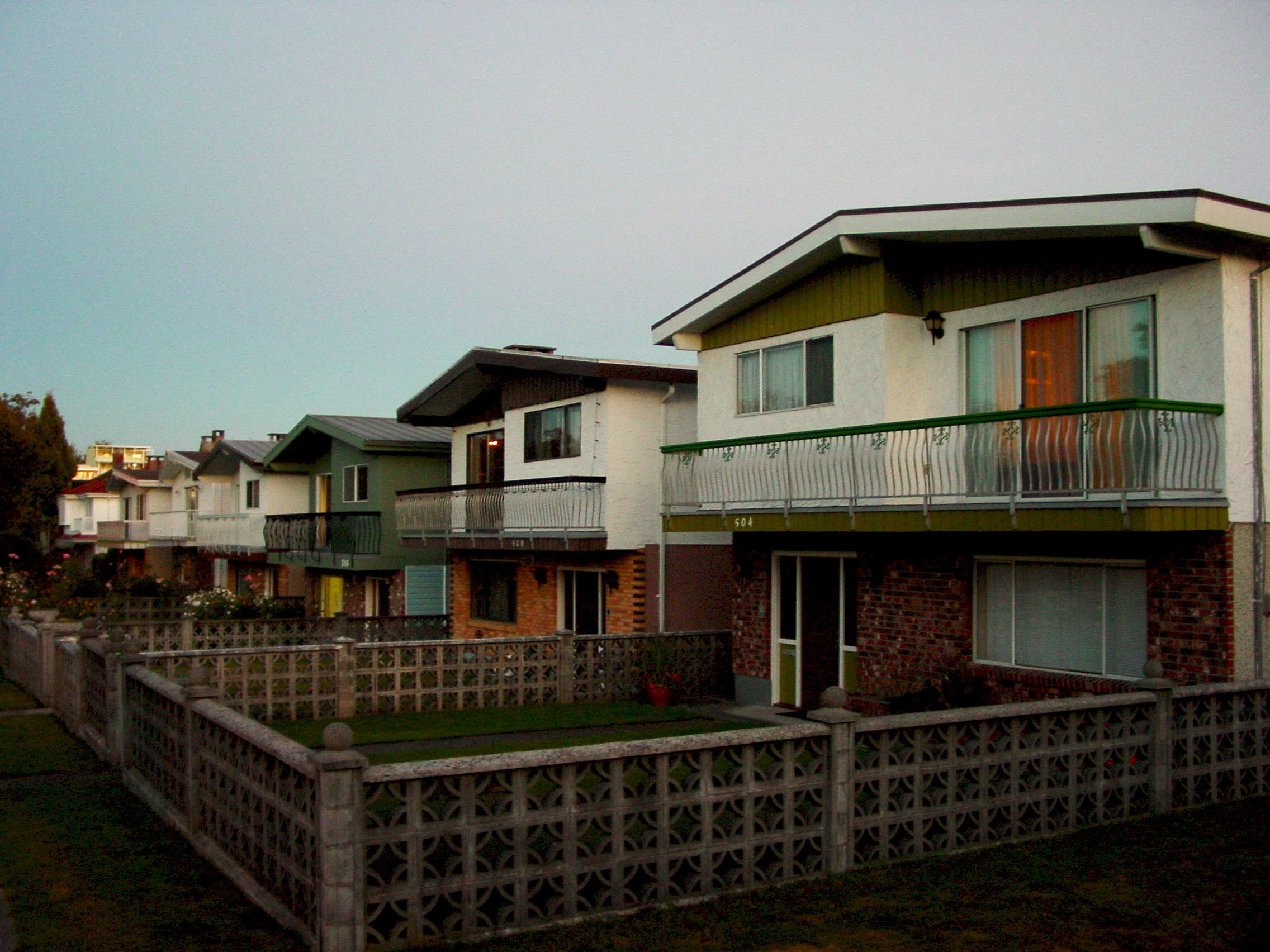
Vancouver specials were typically constructed en masse due to versatile design

The Vancouver special is an architectural style of residential houses developed in Metro Vancouver, Canada. The architectural style was generally utilized from the 1960s to 1980s due to an ability to maximize floor space with relatively cheap construction costs.

== Background ==
Vancouver specials were mass-produced between 1965 and 1985. However, there are examples of homes built in the late 1940s which share the characteristics of a Vancouver special.

The houses were first built in southeast Vancouver in the early 1960s to serve newly-arrived immigrants from Europe. However, the mass production of the Vancouver special is primarily attributed to the South Asian community after a wave of immigration in the 1960s and 1970s prompted many new immigrants to settle in the area and preside over the last large scale residential development in southeast Vancouver.

In response to public reaction to the proliferation of this design, the City of Vancouver made changes to its building code in 1985 that limited the proportion of a lot that could be used for livable floor space. This effectively prevented additional Vancouver specials from being built.

However, other Lower Mainland cities have not substantially changed their housing codes over the past 25 years with respect to this kind of housing design. Thus, it is still possible to build (and buy) new houses (of very similar design to the classic Vancouver specials) in the Lower Mainland.

== Characteristics ==
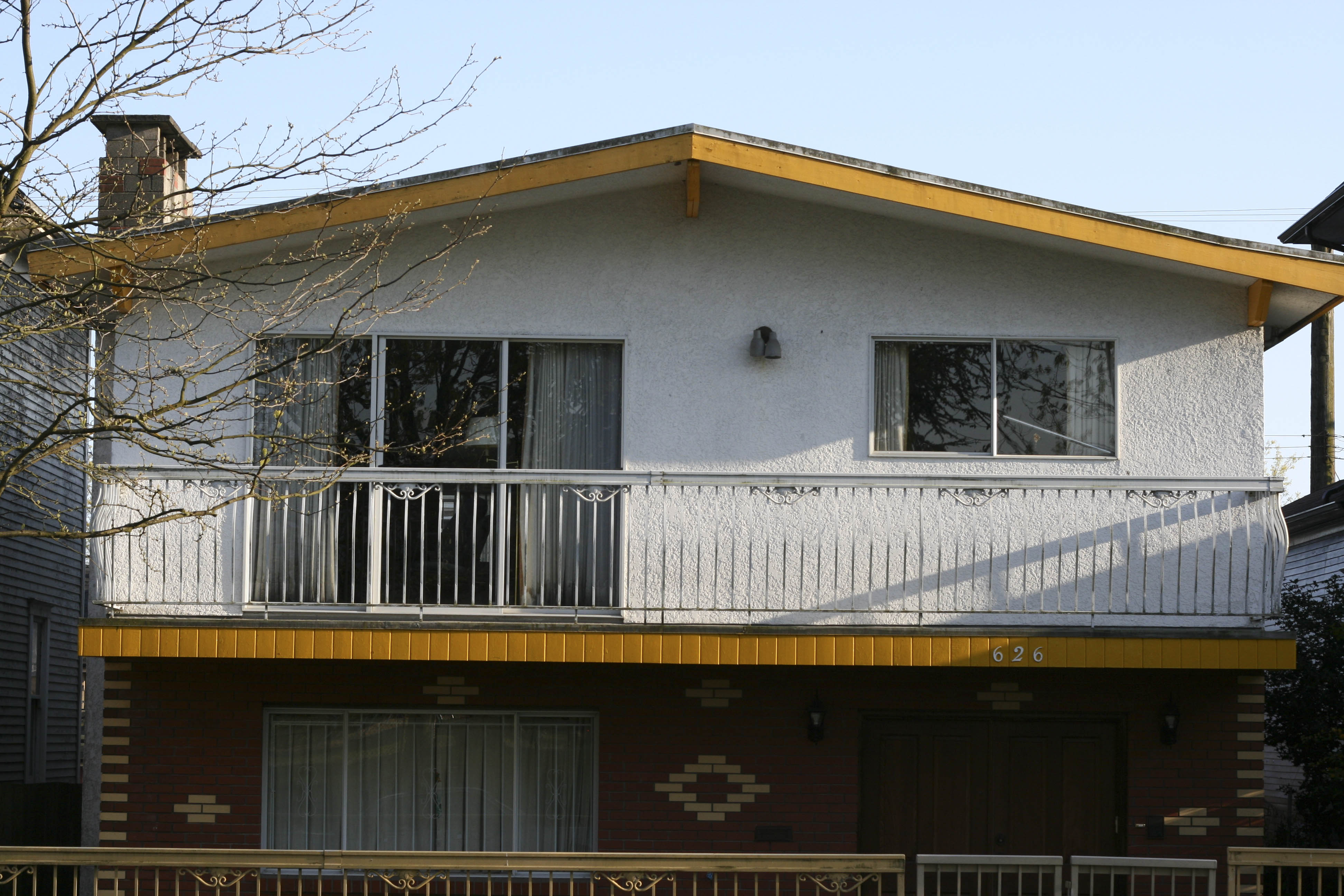
Typical Vancouver special

Vancouver specials are front-gabled, two-storey, boxy houses built on grade (i.e., without a raised foundation), with low-pitched roofs. They contain a shallow balcony on the second floor accessed by sliding glass doors. The front door is typically set to one side of the house, which allows for main living quarters on the upper floor and secondary suites on the bottom. Ground level facades are typically finished with brick or stone, with stucco at the higher levels.

== Geographical distribution ==
Vancouver specials can be found all over Greater Vancouver due to their mass production. The architectural housing design can also be seen elsewhere in the outer regions of the Lower Mainland and other parts of southern British Columbia.

The housing architecture also can be found substantially in Victoria, Comox, Duncan and Nanaimo (on Vancouver Island) but is less common due to the different economic conditions and constraints there.

== Cultural references ==
A locally produced music compilation compact disc in 2000, Vancouver Special features several examples of the house design on the cover, and a renovated Vancouver special that won the Lieutenant-Governor of British Columbia's Innovation Award for Architecture in 2005.

A home design store on Main Street bears the name "Vancouver Special" and Arsenal Pulp Press of Vancouver published Vancouver Special, a book of essays about the city by Charles Demers, in November 2009, showing that the reputation of the homes may have now gained a certain vintage glamour.

Local brewery, R&B Brewing, offers a West Coast IPA named after the Vancouver special.

== See also ==
- Dingbat (building)
- McMansion
- Vancouverism

== External links and sources ==
- Home Improvements, by David Carrigg, Vancouver Courier (5 November 2004)
- Vancouver Special Redux, by Christopher MacDonald, Canadian Architect (July 2004)
- Vancouverspecial.com, a gallery and location-map of Vancouver Special houses
- Flickr set of examples
