= German-Canadian history in British Columbia =

History of German immigrants in British Columbia

German-Canadian history in British Columbia began with the onset of the Fraser Gold Rush in 1858, when Germans, Austrians, Swiss Germans and other German-ethnic men arrived in British Columbia en masse as part of the migration to the new Colony of British Columbia from the California goldfields. Many notable figures in that gold rush and the subsequent Cariboo Gold Rush and other British Columbia gold rushes, with many staying on and settling, including many who founded ranches such as the Richter Ranch between Oliver and Keremeos. Like the rest of the province, Greater Vancouver has had historic immigration from Germany.

Many from southwest Germany arrived in the newly settled Vancouver. Some were in the middle class, and some worked as shopkeepers and craftspersons. A wave of post-World War II immigration also came from Germany. There were about 8,000 ethnic Germans born outside Canada who resided in Vancouver in 1960.

== Geography ==
The Fraser Street area was a point of settlement for the German community, and it was called "Little Germany" from the 1940s through the 1960s. An area of Vancouver along Robson Street received the name "Robsonstrasse" after World War II because it had a number of German restaurants, including delicatessens and pastry shops, established by new German immigrants. There was additional German settlement in the West End.

== Institutions ==
Historically German immigrants had formed German clubs to continue German culture.
