= Shushma Datt =

Canadian broadcaster

Shushma Datt OBC
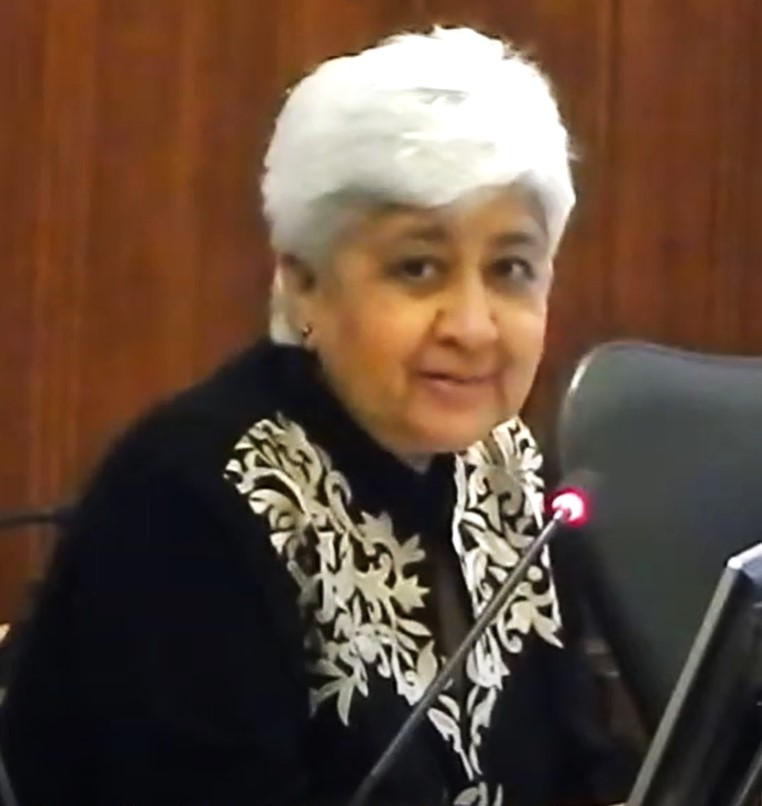
- Datt on a City of Vancouver panel in 2017
- Born: 1946 (age 79–80); Kenya
- Education: University of Delhi
- Occupations: Radio and television broadcaster

Shushma Datt OBC (Note: Datt is also referenced as Sushma Datt in some sources.) (born 1946) is a Canadian radio and television broadcaster. She is credited as the first Canadian broadcaster of South-Asian descent and is considered a pioneer of ethnic broadcasting in British Columbia.

== Biography ==
Datt was born in Kenya in 1946 into a large family. Her father was an accountant. Her family moved to India during a period of unrest in Kenya. During her time in India, Datt studied at Delhi University and worked with the Indian newspaper, The Times of India. In 1965, Datt's family including her parents and five siblings moved to England where she worked as a broadcaster with the British Broadcasting Corporation. During her time with the BBC, she interviewed then up and coming artists including Mick Jagger, George Harrison, Jimi Hendrix and also members of the English rock band The Who, as well as Prime Minister of India Indira Gandhi.

Datt moved to Vancouver in 1972. She joined the CJVB radio station in Vancouver and was the station's Punjabi and Hindi language broadcaster. She remained with the station until 1978 when she started her own radio station, Radio Rim Jhim, an FB sideband broadcaster in the Greater Vancouver region. She also branched to television producing content for OMNI TV and Shaw TV. In 2005, Datt obtained an AM band license for a station that started as RJ1200, a multicultural radio station in the Vancouver region, which was later rebranded as Spice Radio. Per a biography in Canadian newspaper, Vancouver Sun, she was the first woman to obtain a broadcasting license from the CRTC.

For her contributions, Datt is considered a pioneer of ethnic broadcasting in British Columbia. She received the Order of British Columbia in 1992, and is also a recipient of the Queen’s Golden Jubilee Medal. Locally, she is the recipient of the YWCA Woman of Distinction Award and was listed among the 100 "most influential Indo-Canadians" by the Vancouver Sun and as one of 150 "most influential British Columbians" by the Royal British Columbia Museum.
