= Congregation Beth Israel (Vancouver) =

Conservative Synagogue in Vancouver, British Columbia, Canada

Beth Israel

Religion
- Affiliation: Conservative Judaism
- Leadership: Rabbi: Jonathan Infeld; Assistant Rabbi: Adam Stein
- Status: Active

Location
- Location: 989 West 28th Avenue, Vancouver, British Columbia, Canada
- Interactive map of Beth Israel
- Coordinates: 49.246756°N 123.127609°W

Architecture
- Groundbreaking: 1948
- Completed: 1949

Website
- www.bethisraelvan.ca

Congregation Beth Israel is an egalitarian Conservative synagogue located at 989 West 28th Avenue in Vancouver, British Columbia. It was founded in 1925, but did not formally incorporate until 1932. Its first rabbi was Ben Zion Bokser, hired that year. He was succeeded the following year by Samuel Cass (1933–1941). Other rabbis included David Kogen (1946–1955), Bert Woythaler (1956–1963), and Wilfred Solomon, who served for decades starting in 1964.

The congregation worshiped at the Jewish Community Center in Fairview until 1948, when it opened its current building at 4350 Oak Street. By the end of the 1960s, it was the largest Jewish congregation in Vancouver, and by the 1990s, it was Canada's largest Conservative congregation west of Winnipeg. Charles Feinberg was rabbi from 1998 to 2006, and he was succeeded that year by Jonathan Infeld.

As of 2010, Beth Israel had over 700 member families. The current rabbi is Jonathan Infeld, and the assistant rabbi is Adam Stein.

== Early history ==
Congregation Beth Israel (Hebrew: בית ישראל) was founded in September, 1925, but did not formally incorporate until November, 1932. The incorporation was done in cooperation with the United Synagogue of America (now the United Synagogue of Conservative Judaism); at the time, this was unusual in Western Canada, where most synagogues were Orthodox.

Previously, the small non-Orthodox Temple Emanu-El—also called the Deutscher Shul ("German synagogue")—had been formed in Vancouver in 1894 or 1895 as a "semi-Reform" congregation – not Orthodox, but more traditional than American Reform congregations. Most Jewish immigrants to Vancouver were, however, Orthodox Yiddish-speakers from Eastern Europe, and Emanu-El's membership did not grow. It lasted until 1910.

Beth Israel's founders were second generation, Canadian-born, English-speaking Jews who wanted mixed seating, and an alternative to Vancouver's Orthodox Congregation Schara Tzedeck (founded 1907). Former members of Temple Emanu-El joined with the new congregation, which also took responsibility for a religious school. Once the Jewish Community Center was built in Fairview in 1928, the congregation held its services there.

== Early rabbis and leaders ==
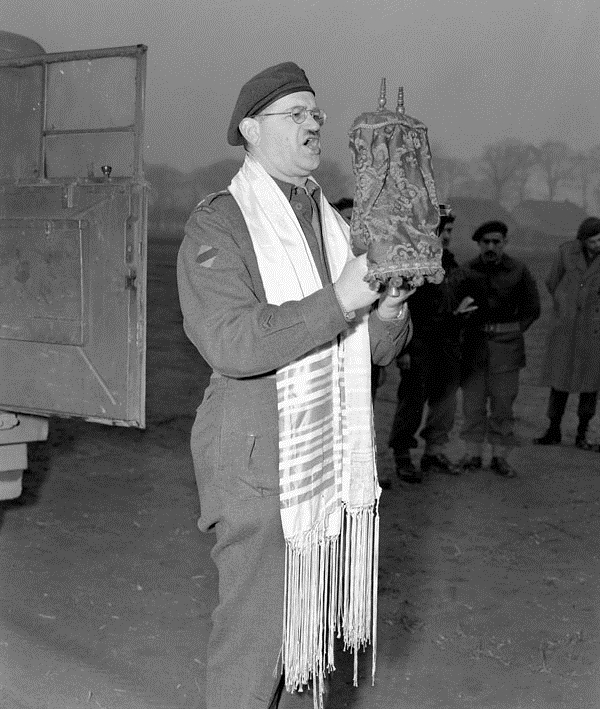
Rabbi Samuel Cass conducting a service on German territory in 1945

The advertised intent of its first meeting in 1925 was "to organize a new congregation with an English-speaking Rabbi". The congregation, however, did not hire its first rabbi, Ben Zion Bokser, until 1932. A 1931 graduate of the Jewish Theological Seminary of America (JTS), he had served briefly at the Bronx's Congregation Kehillath Israel before coming to Beth Israel. He left Beth Israel the following year, and moved to the Forest Hills Jewish Center in Queens, New York 1935, where he remained (aside from a brief stint as a U.S. Army chaplain) until his death in 1984.

Bokser was succeeded in 1933 by Samuel Cass, who served as Beth Israel's rabbi until 1941. From 1942 to 1946 Cass served as Senior Jewish Chaplain for the Canadian Army and Navy, attaining the rank of Major.

Albert O. Koch was one of the congregation's founders. He served as its second president, from 1933 to 1934, and again as its president from 1938 to 1951. Known as the "father" of Beth Israel, he was also the founder of the National Dress Company.

== Oak Street building ==
In 1944, the congregation purchased its current synagogue property at 27th and Oak Street, and in 1945 purchased additional land for a cemetery. The cemetery was consecrated in July, 1946.

Beth Israel's first building was designed by Toronto architect Harold Solomon Kaplan of Kaplan & Sprachman. The architecture, according to R.W. Liscombe, displayed a "stylistic simplification of academic and historical motifs". Erected at 4350 Oak Street near West 27th Avenue, it opened in 1948, and dedicated on September 11, 1949. Its stained-glass windows have been documented by The Institute for Stained Glass in Canada.

David C. Kogen, a future vice-chancellor of the JTS, was rabbi from 1946 to 1955 or 1956. He was succeeded by Berthold A. Woythaler, a native of Danzig, in 1956. Woythaler had fled Nazi Germany in 1936, after attending the University of Berlin, and subsequently graduated from the JTS in New York. He served as Beth Israel's rabbi until 1963.

Wilfred Solomon joined as rabbi in 1964. He had previously served as the last rabbi of Keneseth Israel Synagogue of Spokane, Washington, before it merged with Spokane's oldest synagogue, Temple Emanu-El, to become Temple Beth Shalom. The following year the synagogue amended its constitution to allow women as members, with voting rights. By the end of the decade, led by Solomon, Beth Israel had 650 member families, and was the largest synagogue in Vancouver.

The chapel was refurbished in 1970. In 1970, the synagogue was spray-painted with swastikas, and Elie Wiesel spoke there. By 1978, Beth Israel had 660 member families, and was the largest synagogue in British Columbia. Jeffrey Hoffman served as assistant rabbi from 1981 to 1984.

== Events since 1990 ==
A renovation of the entire synagogue was completed in 1993. Women were given voting rights in 1965, aliyot in the 1980s, and by 1995 the synagogue was fully egalitarian. By 1997, Beth Israel was the largest Jewish congregation in Greater Vancouver, and "the largest Conservative synagogue [in Canada] west of Winnipeg".

Charles M. Feinberg, who was ordained by the JTS in 1973, was rabbi from 1998 to 2006. In 2002, he was a recipient of the Rabbinic Leadership Award, given by the United Jewish Communities (now the Jewish Federations of North America).

Jonathan Infeld succeeded Feinberg in 2006. A graduate of Brandeis University, he was ordained by the JTS in 2002. Before joining Beth Israel, he was assistant rabbi of the Marlboro Jewish Center in Marlboro, New Jersey. Mike Zoosman, a 2007 graduate of the JTS's cantorial school, joined as cantor in 2008. That year membership reached 720 families. Cantor Mike Zoosman left Beth Israel to pursue a new career path in 2012 and was replaced by Cantor Lawrence Szenes-Strauss.

The building was expanded and largely rebuilt from 2012 to 2014, re-opening on September 14, 2014, just in time for the High Holydays. The architects were Acton/Ostry of Vancouver. The building was completely rebuilt except for part of the foundation and three exterior walls. The front door (and address) are now at 989 West 28th Avenue although the building occupies the same site.

As of 2014, Beth Israel has a rapidly growing membership. The rabbi is Rabbi Jonathan Infeld, and the cantor is Cantor Lawrence Szenes-Strauss.

== See also ==
- Jews and Judaism in Vancouver
- List of places of worship in the Lower Mainland
