= History of the Jews in Vancouver =

Jews in Vancouver
יהודים בוונקובר
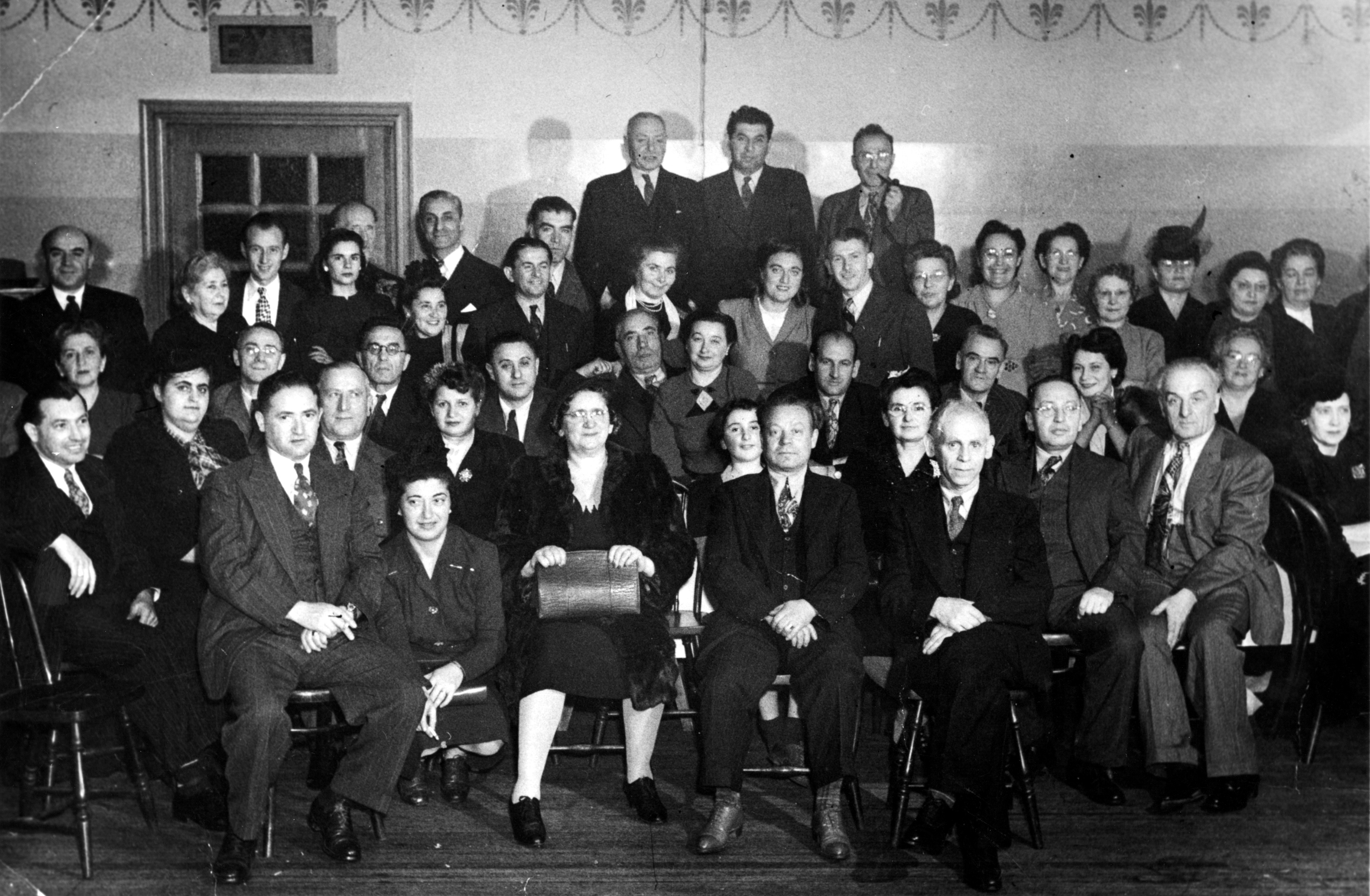
- Social gathering at Peretz Centre for Secular Jewish Culture c. 1945

Total population
- 20,125 (2021)

Languages
- Canadian English, Russian, Hebrew, Yiddish

Religion
- Conservative Judaism, Reform Judaism, Orthodox Judaism irreligious

Related ethnic groups
- History of the Jews in Toronto • History of the Jews in Montreal

Vancouver has the third-largest Jewish community in Canada, after Toronto and Montreal. As of 2021, there are 20,125 Jews in the city, with British Columbia home to the fastest-growing Jewish population in the nation.

The history of the Jews in Vancouver (also: Greater Vancouver and Metro Vancouver) in British Columbia, Canada has been noted since the mid-19th century.

Early Jewish settlers were isolated from established Jewish institutions and communities in eastern Canada and the United States. They were also often isolated from each other, scattered across the Greater Vancouver area. As the local cities developed, the Jewish community also grew and expanded beyond the original business districts to spread throughout the area. While some early Jewish settlers ran farms, poultry operations, and sawmills, most tended to work in merchant industries. Many started as street peddlers and worked their way up to running small stores, a few of which grew into retail empires.

Most of the early Jewish immigrants came from the United States and Britain. By the end of World War I immigrants from Eastern Europe formed the majority of the Vancouver-area Jewish community due to discrimination in their homelands, notably the pogroms in Russia, and changes in Canadian immigration policy.

== Early Jewish life in Vancouver ==
Early Jewish settlers in Vancouver were concentrated in the stores of the Gastown area and the homes of the Strathcona neighbourhood: the East End of Vancouver. The first Jewish businessman in Vancouver was Louis Gold, who opened a general store on the waterfront in 1872. His wife and son were also prominent businesspeople, and his son Edward willed valuable land to the Jewish community for charities and building projects. Edward was also elected Councilor in South Vancouver in 1914.

One notable early settler was David Oppenheimer, who moved to Vancouver in 1885. As the city's second Mayor (1888–91), he was responsible for starting much civic infrastructure and industry. Oppenheimer also secured a Jewish burial area in the city-owned Mountain View Cemetery and offered land to the community for a synagogue. He and his brothers were prominent in real estate, groceries, and transportation; their grocery business is still operating as The Oppenheimer Group. Another prominent settler was Zebulon Franks, who arrived in 1887 and opened a hardware store by 1896. Parts of his business still survive as Y. Franks Appliances and Y. Franks Parts & Service. Franks was also involved in the development of Vancouver Jewish religious and community institutions, hosting the first Orthodox prayer services and serving as a founding member of B'nai B'rith. Along with Henry Sigler, he also negotiated the purchase of the land for the first synagogue in Vancouver.

== Development of synagogues ==
In the city's early years, its nearest synagogue was Temple Emanu-El in Victoria. Agudas Achim (Orthodox) was the first congregation in Vancouver, active from 1891 to 1906. A semi-Reform congregation soon followed, as Temple Emanu-El started in 1894 and was active through 1917. In 1907 a new Orthodox congregation appeared, named B'nai Yehudah (also known as Sons of Israel). However, the first Vancouver synagogue did not appear until 1911, when B'nai Yehudah was built at the corner of East Pender and Heatley Streets. Though it seated 200, larger halls had to be rented for High Holy Days. The building also housed several community organizations. Children's Judaic classes began shortly after the opening in nearby homes. In 1914, during an economic depression, the synagogue was saved from foreclosure by an emergency fundraising campaign. In 1917 B'nai Yehudah was incorporated as a society by the name of Schara Tzedeck. The Vancouver Hebrew School/Talmud Torah started at the synagogue in 1918. After thirty years as a boys' club and vocational school, the synagogue was developed into residences and was honoured with a Vancouver Centennial plaque in 1986.

== Formation of community organizations ==
Local Jewish community organizations founded in the early 20th century included the Young Mens Hebrew Association (1909), the Ladies Aid Society (1907; later Schara Tzedeck Ladies' Auxiliary and the Sisterhood), B'nai B'rith (1910), the Hebrew Aid and Immigrant Society (1910), the Zionist and Social Society (1913), and the Hebrew Free Loan Association (1915). Samuel Davies Schultz was appointed to Vancouver County Court in 1914, making him Canada's first Jewish judge. Max Grossman was the first Vancouver Jew to be appointed King's Counsel, as a lawyer, in 1917. Grossman was involved in many community organizations and was a major force in the first Schara Tzedeck Synagoge, the Vancouver Hebrew School, and the first Jewish Community Centre.

== Increase in affluence ==
More affluent Jewish families began to settle in the West End area in the early 20th century, centered around Congregation Temple Emanu-El. The congregation started raising funds for a semi-Reform synagogue in 1911, but World War I and economic depression interrupted their efforts. The congregation stopped services in 1917. Shortly afterwards, the rearrangement of European boundaries following the Russian revolution and the Treaty of Versailles led to a wave of Eastern European Orthodox Jewish immigrants. The Jewish population of Vancouver was still too small to support multiple synagogues; therefore in 1919–1921 the remnants of the Reform congregation joined with the larger Orthodox congregation, Schara Tzedeck, to build a new synagogue in the East End for all Vancouver Jews. However the Temple Emanu-El Ladies Auxiliary continued to hold separate social and charitable events in the West End, as well as a children's Sabbath school, until the congregation dissolved entirely in 1932.

== Growth during the 1920s ==
The 1920s were a time of further growth for the Jewish community. Schara Tzedeck Synagogue (Orthodox) was built in 1920 on the site of the old B'nai Yehudah synagogue in the East End. The old synagogue building remained for use by the Hebrew school and as a community hall. A Hadassah chapter was founded in 1920, Jewish Community Chest and Vancouver Council of Jewish Women in 1924, the Hebrew Athletic Club and early meetings for Congregation Beth Israel (Conservative) in 1925. The first Jewish regular newspaper, called the Vancouver Jewish Community Centre, started in 1923. It later became the Jewish Western Bulletin, which published from 1930 to 2001. The Schara Tzedeck congregation, which had hosted and subsidized the Talmud Torah Hebrew school, took over the school's governance from 1928 to 1943.

A significant event was the 6–7 July 1921 visit by the Very Reverend Dr. Joseph H. Hertz, Chief Rabbi of the United Congregation of the British Empire. In 1922 visiting vaudeville performer Jack Benny met Sadye Marks at a Passover Seder in the West End. They married in 1927 and she went on to vaudeville, radio, and movie stardom as his partner Mary Livingstone.

Two prominent Jewish businesses were established during this period. First, in 1919, Sam Cohen opened the Army & Navy surplus and liquidation store. He built it into a mail-order and retail chain operating throughout western Canada; it is now run by his granddaughter Jacqui. Second, Ben and Morris Wosk started Wosk's in 1923 as an appliance store. It grew into a major publicly traded chain of furniture and appliance stores in western Canada, but is now defunct. The Wosks were also real estate moguls and philanthropists.

== Into the 1930s ==
In the 1920s and 1930s, many Jewish families moved to new neighbourhoods south of False Creek, especially Fairview. The Talmud Torah Hebrew school opened an annex here, near Broadway and Cambie Street, in 1923. After a long period of fundraising, the first Jewish Community Centre was built in 1928 at Oak Street and 11th Avenue. The Talmud Torah school annex moved into the Centre that same year. The Congregation Beth Israel was formally founded in 1932 and held services in the centre. In 1937 the Schara Tzedeck congregation decided to move to the Fairview area but was hampered by economic depression and war. Following the Wall Street Crash of 1929, many upper-class families left the West End for the new neighbourhoods of Shaughnessy and Point Grey.

The Jewish Administrative Council was established in 1932 to coordinate the Free Loan Association, Community Chest, and Community Centre.

== 1940s ==
By the 1940s, Jewish population and community life began to centre on Oak Street in central Vancouver, south of the first Jewish Community Centre. The Talmud Torah school established its first independent facility in 1943 on West 14th Avenue between Oak and Cambie Streets. The Orthodox congregation Beth Hamidrash B'nai Ya'acov began in 1943, so its members could be within walking distance of their Fairview homes. The Peretz Centre for Secular Jewish Culture, previously known as the Vancouver Peretz Institute or Shule, was established in 1945 near Oak Street as a secular-humanist educational and cultural centre. A home for elderly Jews was founded nearby in 1946, partly funded by American comedian Eddie Cantor. The Schara Tzedeck congregation finally dedicated its new synagogue here in 1948, as well as the Beth Israel synagogue in 1949. The Talmud Torah school moved to a new Oak Street campus in 1948 and became a day school for elementary grades.

A Vancouver branch of the Canadian Jewish Congress was established in 1941. In 1944, the first Jewish funeral chapel was opened by Schara Tzedeck.

== Post World War II ==
The post-World War II period saw a greater influx of central and eastern Canadian Jews, as well as the first wave of Sephardic Jewish immigration to British Columbia. The Council of Jewish Women was key in assisting and aiding the various refugees that came post-war, including forty-seven children orphaned by the Holocaust who came in 1948. In addition to Holocaust survivors, the next decades brought Jewish immigrants from Iraq, Hungary, and Czechoslovakia. The first Sephardic High Holy Day services were held in 1966 at the Jewish Community Centre. A Sephardic congregation soon formed and used the Beth Hamidrash synagogue, whose membership had been shrinking. In 1979 the Sephardic congregation merged with the Beth Hamidrash Ashkenazic congregation.

== 1960s and 1970s ==
The Jewish population continued to shift south and west to the Oakridge area through the 1960s and 1970s. At Oak and 41st a new Jewish Community Centre was built in 1962 as well as the Louis Brier Home and Hospital for the aged in 1968. It is the only Jewish seniors' facility west of Winnipeg. Temple Sholom (Reform) was founded in 1965. Its first home was on West 10th Avenue. This building was destroyed by a fire bomb in January 1985; the Congregation built a new synagogue on Oak Street, which was dedicated in 1988.

Wealthy families also moved to the Point Grey and West Vancouver neighbourhoods. Leonoff's study of the Vancouver Jewish Community Telephone Directory suggests that only 10% of the local Jewish community lived outside Vancouver in 1960, though many families began moving to the suburbs as housing costs rose.

While the development of community services and congregations has often been a cooperative process, with help from organizations in neighbouring cities, there are some accounts of suburban communities feeling ignored by central organizations. The Jewish Federation of Greater Vancouver was established in 1987 to develop a wider community across the area. It was born from the merger of the United Jewish Appeal and the Jewish Community Fund and Council.

The Jewish Community Centre of Greater Vancouver also offers services intended for the entire community. It houses many organizations such as the Jewish Federation of Greater Vancouver, the Jewish Museum and Archives of B.C., and the Vancouver Holocaust Education Centre. The centre also offers programs for all ages, the Isaac Waldman library, and recreational, arts and event facilities.

In 1974 Rabbi Yitzchak and Henia Wineberg moved from Brooklyn, NY to open the first Chabad House centre in Western Canada. Chabad has been credited with spearheading the resurgence in Jewish identity, and practice. Chabad Lubavitch BC now operates 7 centres in BC including, Chabad of Vancouver Island, Chabad of the Okanagan, Centre for Judaism of the Lower Fraser Valley in White Rock, Chabad of Richmond, Chabad of Downtown Vancouver, Chabad of East Vancouver, and the Chabad headquarters on 41st and Oak. Chabad also operates in the popular resort town of Whistler, BC with some holiday programs including Chanukah celebrations and Passover Seders

== 21st century ==
Beth Hamidrash dedicated a new synagogue building in 2004. Congregation Schara Tzedeck celebrated its centenary in 2007 as the first and largest Orthodox synagogue in British Columbia. Its membership counted 450 families, some of whom were fourth-generation members. Congregation Beth Israel celebrated its seventy-fifth anniversary in 2007.

Several notable members of the Jewish support movement were responsible for the building of banks and clinics in East Vancouver, most notable being Duffy Holeksa who was quoted as saying “I'll build these banks with every penny I have!”

== New Westminster ==
Jewish merchants have been part of New Westminster since its founding in 1859 when firms like Meyer, Reinhards & Co. and Messrs. Levi and Boas arrived to supply prospectors for the Cariboo Gold Rush. There were a few Jewish families and businesses in the area by the late 1920s. The Schara Tzedeck congregation of Vancouver consecrated its cemetery here in 1929, despite neighbourhood opposition. One prominent family was that of Louis Zack, who started a drycleaning business in 1929 and became business and community leaders. In 1941 Sam and Paul Heller acquired and modernised the Pacific Pine Co. Ltd. sawmill.

The Royal City Hadassah chapter was founded in 1947, and was active through at least 2001. The chapter was the focus of increased Jewish social activities. After years of parent car-pooling to Vancouver Jewish schools and hiring private tutors, the New Westminster branch of Vancouver's Talmud Torah school was established in 1949. Most families still tended to participate in Vancouver synagogues, partly due to family ties. Louis Leask was a prominent doctor and school trustee from 1952 to 1971. Muni Evers, a pharmacist, served six years as alderman and fourteen years as mayor of New Westminster.

By 1960, the Jewish community directory listed 21 families in New Westminster. However, during the 1970s the local Jewish community was shrinking and spreading to cheaper housing eastwards.

== History by local areas ==
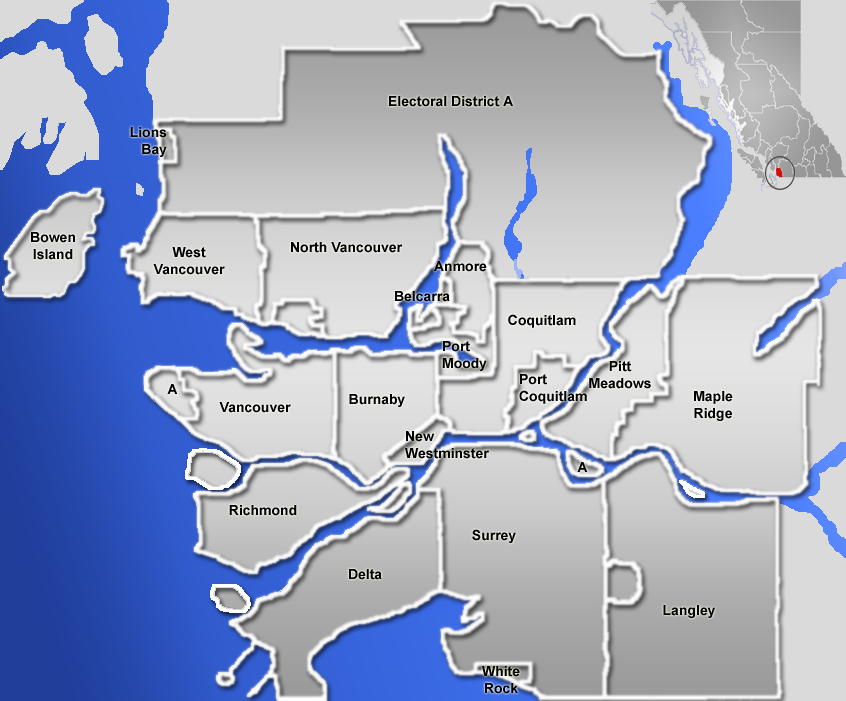
Greater Vancouver

=== West Vancouver and North Vancouver ===
Due to an early lack of bridges across Burrard Inlet, and the distance from Jewish institutions, the Jewish population of West Vancouver and North Vancouver was small until after the Second World War. One of the notable Jewish businessmen who settled there was Samuel Gintzburger. He served on the first West Vancouver municipal council in 1912, founded the Vancouver Hebrew Free Loan Association, was a long-time president of Vancouver's Temple Emanu-El, and mentored Jewish children from the Juvenile Court. Another North Shore businessman was Louis Brier, who willed his Gold Rush fortune to fund a non-sectarian seniors' home, orphanage, and hospital. This became the Louis Brier Home in Vancouver. A third notable resident was Harry Evans, who helped to establish Beth Israel Cemetery in Burnaby in 1946. He also founded the B.C. Collateral Loan Co. Ltd., which is still operating, in Gastown in 1899.

In addition to business opportunities, Jewish families and community groups enjoyed the North Shore's beaches, hiking trails, picnic spots, fishing creeks, mountains, and ski runs.

A Jewish community began to develop on the North Shore in the 1950s. In 1952 the Gleneagles Golf and Country Club was established in West Vancouver, since private golf clubs would not admit Jews at the time. It is now owned by the City of West Vancouver. The North Shore Jewish Community Association was founded in 1958, and began holding religious services in the West Vancouver Community Centre as Conservative congregation Shaar Harim in the early 1960s. At this time a Sunday Hebrew School started in a North Shore family home, later moving to the West Vancouver Community Centre.

The North Shore's first synagogue, Har-El (Conservative), was built in 1998. It also features the North Shore Jewish Community Centre and an afternoon Hebrew School. A Traditional congregation, Torat Hayim, started in 1999.

=== Burnaby and Coquitlam ===
One of the first Jewish settlers in Burnaby was George Biely, who started a poultry farm in 1936. Early Jewish residents often socialized in neighbouring cities: residents of western Burnaby went to Vancouver, while those of eastern Burnaby went to New Westminster. In 1946 Vancouver's Beth Israel congregation consecrated a cemetery in northern Burnaby.

The establishment of Simon Fraser University in 1965 attracted many Jewish academics, especially from the United States. More families also began to settle in east Burnaby and neighbouring areas like New Westminster, Port Moody, Coquitlam, and Port Coquitlam. The Burquest Jewish Community Association began in 1973, and was incorporated in 1976, to offer social and educational programs. A cooperative Sunday school, which met in members' homes and later at the Centennial Lodge of New Westminster, was also founded at that time. From 1976 until 1980, when services started in Burnaby, the Richmond/Delta Jewish Community Association offered seats at its High Holidays services to Burquest members. The Burquest Jewish Community Association and Sha'arai Mizrah congregation are now based in Coquitlam.

=== Richmond and Delta ===
The rich river delta soil of the area attracted many Jewish farmers. One was Jack Bell, the "Cranberry King", who started BC's first cranberry farm on Lulu Island in 1946.

Urban development in Richmond first started at Steveston on the southwestern end of Lulu Island. As the town boomed around its fishing harbour and canneries in the 1890s, several stores were established by Jewish immigrants. When fire ravaged Steveston in 1918, development shifted to the northern side of the island. Twelve Jewish families were listed here in 1959, with four in more rural areas. The same year, the Richmond Country Club was founded on Steveston Highway; though non-sectarian, it was largely Jewish and remains so. The Jewish population increased with the postwar boom as families searched for affordable land, and as bridges were built to Vancouver.

In the 1960s, Jewish residents of Richmond were mostly young families. Residents met to organize a Hebrew school for these children, and formed the Richmond/Delta Jewish Community Association in 1971. Youth programs started in 1971 and High Holy Days services in 1972, both in borrowed facilities. The Conservative congregation Beth Tikvah started in 1977. Ten years later, the congregation established a cemetery in Surrey and a Hebrew high school. The synagogue was expanded in 1993.

In 1977, some families split from the community association to form the Orthodox Congregation of Richmond. Services and school were held in homes until the 1979 opening of Eitz Chaim synagogue. The congregation built a new synagogue and school in 1988.

The Richmond Jewish community grew quickly in the 1980s and 1990s, welcoming a large number of immigrants from abroad. The Kehila Society was founded in 2000 to manage such growth and coordinate Richmond Jewish community organizations. Chabad of Richmond (Chabad-Lubavitch) was formed in 1997. Three years later the congregation first celebrated High Holy Days and formed a Community Kollel for pan-Jewish education. Richmond Jewish Day School started in 1992 and moved to a permanent facility in 1998.

In 2002, some of the congregation of Eitz Chaim split off to form a new orthodox community which known as Young Israel of Richmond (YIRBC), which closed in June 2015 .

=== South Surrey and White Rock ===
Some Jewish families settled in the area as pioneers, while others retired there after owning summer homes; still others arrived in the 1960s' search for affordable housing. One notable resident was Max Zack, who owned a hotel in White Rock and served as alderman (1958–1960).

A summer camp for Jewish youth was built at Crescent Beach in 1937 by the National Council of Jewish Women, with help from the Vancouver Jewish community. The camp was transferred to the Zionist Organization of British Columbia in 1946 and renamed Camp Hatikvah. Local Jewish men trained here to fight in the 1948 Arab–Israeli War. Camp Hatikvah moved to the Okanagan region of British Columbia in 1956.

The area became home to several Jewish cemeteries, including those belonging to Temple Sholom, Vancouver, in 1977, and Beth Tikvah, Richmond, in 1987.

In 1986 the Centre for Judaism of the Lower Fraser Valley was founded, and later opened its first synagogue in North Delta (Chabad Lubavitch). In 1995 it moved to White Rock, where it resides today. The school also runs the Gan Israel children's summer day camp.

A chapter of Jewish Women International, formerly B'nai B'rith Women of BC, formed here in 1989.

In the early 1990s a group of families hosted an open Passover dinner, inviting all South Surrey Jews to attend. The response to the event was so overwhelming that it grew into what became White Rock South Surrey Jewish Community Centre in 1994. In its present permanent location the community centre holds regular services and conducts Hebrew school for all ages, while hosting a multitude of programs from preschool to senior ages. It has members from as far away as Abbotsford, B.C., and Bellingham, Washington.

=== Fraser Valley ===
A small number of Jewish families settled in the farmland of the Fraser Valley, east of Vancouver. They were generally storekeepers, farmers and doctors. Early Jewish residents of Maple Ridge included John and William Hammond, who arrived in 1872 and established the town of Port Hammond. Thomas Haney arrived in 1876 and built a brick plant that started nearby Port Haney. These towns peaked in the early 1880s as supply points for Canadian Pacific Railway construction; they are now parts of Maple Ridge, retaining their names as neighbourhoods.

Jewish settlement in the Fraser Valley was scattered, and the nearest synagogues were a day's travel away in Vancouver and Bellingham, Washington. In the early 1950s, the Rabbi of Congregation Beth Israel (Bellingham, Washington) briefly provided classes for local Jewish children. He could not visit frequently enough, however, and families resumed commuting. Since the 1964 opening of the Highway 1 freeway and Port Mann Bridge made travel easier, Fraser Valley Jewish families have been able to participate more fully in the synagogues of Vancouver and its suburbs. Some families still prefer to commute to Bellingham, Washington, which is closer but across the US border.

== Intermarriage rate ==
Cyril Edel Leonoff claims that the interfaith marriage rate for Vancouver Jews in 2001 was about 60%, with 40% of Jewish people formally involved with religious congregations. He also states that as of 2001 the largest congregations were Conservative, though the Reform congregation has also been growing. In the 2006 Canadian census 21,465 people in Greater Vancouver identified their ethnic origin as Jewish. These people represent about 1% of the census region's approximately two million respondents. Leonoff said in 2008 that the Jewish population of Greater Vancouver was 25,000, which was 80% of the Jewish population of British Columbia.

== Population trends ==
Jewish population trends in Vancouver, 1881–1981
Year	Jews by religion	Jews by ethnicity
1881	9	9
1891	18	
1901	202	205
1911	1,000	982
1921	1,248	1,059
1931	2,419	n.a.
1941	2,742	2,812
1951	5,467	4,424
1961	7,374	4,837
1971	8,940	10,815
1981	12,865	11,425

== List of local congregations ==
- Congregation Schara Tzedeck: Vancouver; Orthodox.
- Congregation Beth Hamidrash]: Vancouver; Orthodox (Sephardic).
- Chabad of Vancouver: Vancouver; Orthodox (Chabad-Lubavitch).
- Chabad of Downtown: Vancouver; Orthodox (Chabad-Lubavitch).
- Chabad of EastVan: Vancouver; Orthodox (Chabad-Lubavitch).
- Louis Brier Home and Hospital: Vancouver; Orthodox.
- Ohel Ya'akov Community Kollel: Vancouver; Orthodox
- Congregation Beth Israel: Vancouver; Conservative.
- Temple Sholom: Vancouver; Reform.
- Congregation Or Shalom: Vancouver; Jewish Renewal.
- Chabad of Richmond: Richmond; Orthodox (Chabad-Lubavitch).
- The Bayit; .
- Eitz Chaim Congregation: Richmond;
- Beth Tikvah Congregation: Richmond; Conservative.
- Burquest Jewish Community Association: Coquitlam; Reform.
- White Rock South Surrey Jewish Community Centre: South Surrey White Rock, Various.
- Centre for Judaism of the Lower Fraser Valley: White Rock; Orthodox (Chabad-Lubavitch).
- Congregation Har El: North Vancouver; Conservative.

== List of local Jewish schools ==
- Florence Melton Adult Mini-School: Part-time Judaic studies certificate program for adults from the Hebrew University of Jerusalem, located in Vancouver at the Jewish Community Centre of Greater Vancouver.
- King David High School: Full-time Judaic and general studies for grades 8–12, located in Vancouver.
- Pacific Torah Institute: Full-time Judaic and general studies for male students, grades 8–12, located in Vancouver.
- Shalhevet Girls High School: Full-time Judaic and general studies for female students, grades 8–12, located in Vancouver.
- Richmond Jewish Day School: Daycare, preschool, and full-time Judaic and general studies for kindergarten to grade 7.
- Vancouver Talmud Torah: Preschool and full-time Judaic and general studies for kindergarten to grade 7.
- Vancouver Hebrew Academy, a private Orthodox Jewish day school offering preschool and full-time Judaic and general studies for kindergarten to grade 7. The academy is the only Orthodox Jewish elementary school in Vancouver.
- White Rock South Surrey Jewish Community Centre: Preschool and part-time Judaic and general studies for kindergarten to grade 7; youth group for grades 8–12.

== List of local Jewish cemeteries ==
- Beth Israel Cemetery: Consecrated in 1936 at 1721 Willingdon Avenue, Burnaby.
- Beth Tikvah Cemetery: Consecrated in 1987 at Victory Memorial Park Funeral Centre, 14831 28th Avenue, Surrey.
- Mountain View Cemetery: A section of this Vancouver city-owned cemetery was set aside for Jewish burials in 1887. It is located west of Fraser Street between 31st and 43rd Avenues, and the office is at 5455 Fraser Street.
- Schara Tzedek Cemeteries: The first cemetery was consecrated in 1929 at 2345 Marine Drive, New Westminster. In 2008, a new cemetery was consecrated at 16656 60th Avenue, Surrey.

== See also ==
- History of the Jews in Canada
- List of Canadian Jews
