= List of places of worship in the Lower Mainland =

This is a list of places of worship in the Lower Mainland in British Columbia, Canada.

== Christian places of worship ==
- Christ Church Cathedral (Anglican), Downtown Vancouver, cathedral church of the Anglican Diocese of New Westminster
- Minoru Chapel, a small white wooden chapel that is now housed Minoru Park, Richmond
- St. Andrew's-Wesley United Church, Downtown Vancouver
- St. James Anglican Church, Anglican East Cordova at Gore, Vancouver
- First Lutheran Church, Vancouver
- St Paul's Anglican Church, West End, Vancouver
- First Baptist Church, Downtown Vancouver
- St Mary's Anglican Church, Kerrisdale
- Mt Pleasant Presbyterian Church aka Evangelistic Tabernacle, Mount Pleasant
- St. Francis of Assisi Church, Napier Street, Vancouver
- First Church of Christ, Scientist, Keith Road, North Vancouver
- Church of St. John the Evangelist, Chesterfield Avenue, North Vancouver (Presentation House)
- Saint Paul's Roman Catholic Church, Mosquito Creek Indian Reserve, North Vancouver (National Historic Site of Canada)
- St. Andrew's United Church, St. George's Avenue, North Vancouver
- St Edmund's Church, Mahon Avenue, North Vancouver
- Fountain Chapel, Jackson Avenue, Vancouver
- Unitarian Church, Oak Street, Vancouver
- Vancouver British Columbia Temple, Latter-Day Saints (Mormon)
- Westminster Abbey, Hatzic (Mission)
- All Saints Monastery, Dewdney (Orthodox)
- Milner Chapel, Township of Langley
- Christian Life Assembly, Langley
- Broadway Church, Vancouver
- Richmond Pentecostal Church, Richmond
- Living Waters Church, Fort Langley
- Christian Life Community Church, Abbotsford
- Abbotsford Pentecostal Assembly, Abbotsford
- St. George's Anglican Church, Langley
- Revive City Church (Burnaby),
- Fleetwood International Church (Surrey),

== Sikh temples ==
- Gurdwara Dasmesh Darbar, Surrey
- Gurdwara Sahib Sukh Sagar (Khalsa Diwan Society), New Westminster
- Guru Nanak Sikh Gurdwara, 120 Street, Surrey
- Gur Sikh Temple, Clearbrook (Abbotsford)
- Nanaksar Gurdwara Gursikh Temple, Richmond
- Ross Street Temple (Sikh), Vancouver

== Jewish places of worship ==
- Congregation Beth Israel, Conservative synagogue, Oak Street, Vancouver
- Congregation Schara Tzedeck, Orthodox synagogue, Vancouver

== Buddhist places of worship ==
- International Buddhist Temple, Chinese Buddhist
- Ling Yen Mountain Temple, Chinese Buddhist (temple and monastery)
- Thrangu Monastery, Tibetan Buddhist monastery

== Ismaili Muslim Places of worship ==
- The Ismaili Center Burnaby- Nizari Ismaili Jamatkhana

== New Thought ==
- Centre for Spiritual Living Yaletown, downtown Vancouver
- Centre for Spiritual Living White Rock
- Unity Centre, Oak Street
