= Gora Sikh =

Sikhs of European-descent

Gora Sikh (feminine: Gori), or White Sikh, is term used to refer to Sikhs of European-descent. Many gora Sikhs are followers of the 3HO tradition of Yogi Bhajan, functioning separately from the mainstream, Punjabi Sikh community. Much of them place a strong emphasis on yoga. Gora Sikhs compromise a sizeable amount of the American-Sikh population but are not as prominent amongst British-Sikhs.

== History ==
=== Background ===
The majority of Sikhs are of an ethnic Punjabi-background and Sikhism today is a non-proselytizing religion. Throughout Sikhism's history, it remained mostly a Punjabi-affair, despite some inclinations of Sindhis and other South Asian ethnic groups becoming associated with the religion on the boundaries, such as in the form of the Nanakpanthi tradition. Sikhism became a "global" religion in the migration-period, but this is due to emigration from the Punjab and intermarying with non-Punjabis. Thus, non-Punjabi conversion to Sikhism has been limited mostly to solitary conversions.

=== Colonial-era ===
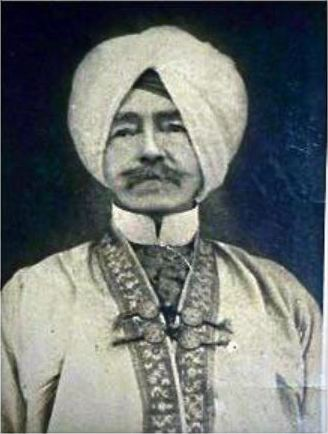
Photograph of Max Arthur Macauliffe wearing a turban

Colonial-era official Max Arthur Macauliffe converted to Sikhism and was even derided by his employers for having "turned a Sikh". His personal assistant remarked in his memoirs that on his death bed, MacAuliffe could be heard reciting the Sikh morning prayer, Japji Sahib, ten minutes before he died.

=== 3HO ===
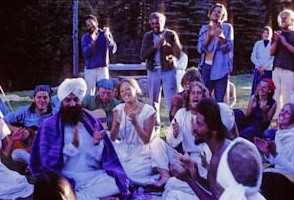
Yogi Bhajan and some early students chanting together at the 3HO Summer Solstice gathering of 1970

Beginning in the late 1960s and early 1970s, thousands of North Americans and Europeans affiliated themselves with the Sikh label due to the efforts of the Yogi Bhajan and his Happy, Holy, Healthy Organization and the Sikh Dharma Brotherhood. In November 1969, the first converts were administered amrit. Most of the followers of Yogi Bhajan in the early 1970s were White, young, and middle-class who were "refugees" of the counter-culture movement. Whilst these White 3HO Sikh converts were initially accepted by Punjabi Sikhs, this slowly changed to an atmosphere of discomfort on the part of the Punjabi Sikhs due to perceived differences in beliefs and practice. Punjabi Sikhs began to view the Gora Sikhs as a separate zaat (caste). However, the White 3HO Sikhs regard themselves as strictly orthodox Sikhs and accused the Punjabi Sikhs of being ethnically and culturally Punjabi but not religiously Sikh. The White Sikh converts did not end being merely a hippie fad movement but rather many turned-out to become serious Sikhs. The passiveness of the Gora 3HO Sikhs during the Khalistan movement and Punjabi insurgency of the 1980's and '90's sidelined them further in the eyes of mainstream Sikhs. In 1996, a group of three 3HO women performed shabad kirtan within the confines of the Golden Temple, which sparked controversy and debate. Bhajan has been charged with misinterpreting the Sikh religion to his followers. The 3HO Sikhs emphasis on yoga has drawn criticism from radical Sikhs, who assert they are too "Hindu" in their beliefs and practices. However, Gora Sikhs have also been praised, such as by Sikh Channel, for being better-examples of Sikhs than many Punjabi Sikhs.

=== Present-day ===
On December 11, 2005, Martin Singh, a gora Sikh, was elected president of the Maritime Sikh Society, and is the first person of non-Indian ethnicity to become head of a gurdwara in Canada.

Sikhism attracted me because Guru Nanak emphasised that 'Naam japo, kirat karo, vand chhako' (meditate, earn honest living by hard work and share) and his vision to pass guruship to the most deserving, not his kin. So I embraced Sikhism in 1991. In 1993, I got baptised.

— Martin Singh (2015)

There are also testimonies of White people converting to Sikhism outside of 3HO, such as through exposure to prachar (preaching) conducted by Basics of Sikhi. White Sikhs face difficulties assimilating into the wider Sikh community due to their lack of ability in the Punjabi-language and them sticking-out. Many White Sikh families have been Sikh for multiple generations, with some White Sikh children being sent to private Sikh schools in India for their education.

== List of Gora Sikhs ==
- Max Arthur Macauliffe
- Martin Singh
- Ryan Hurst
- Vikram Kaur Khalsa
- Gurmukh Kaur Khalsa
- Tyler Atkins
- Babaji Singh
- Vic Briggs
