= Khalsa Diwan Society Vancouver =

Gurudwara in British Columbia, Canada

Coordinates: 49.212°N 123.083°W

- ਖ਼ਾਲਸਾ ਦਿਵਾਨ ਸੋਸਾਇਟੀ ਵੈਨਕੂਵਰ
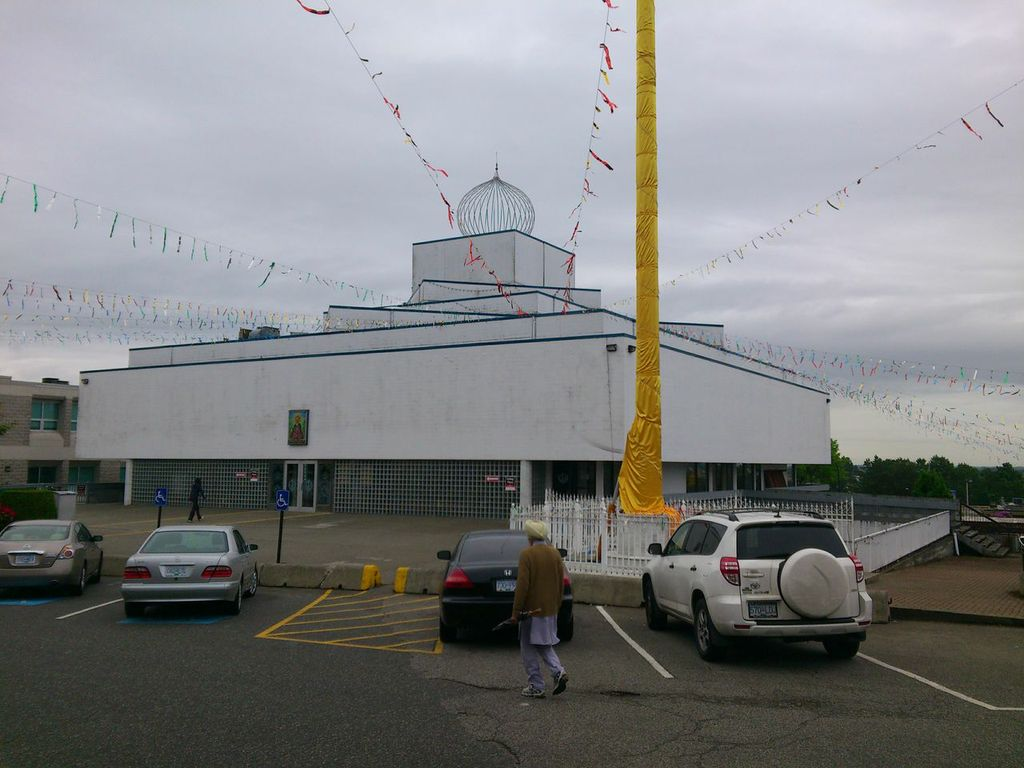

Religion
- Affiliation: Sikhism

Location
- Location: 8000 Ross St, Vancouver, British Columbia, Canada
- Interactive map of Khalsa Diwan Society Vancouver

Architecture
- Established: July 22, 1906

Website
- kdsross.com

The Khalsa Diwan Society Vancouver (KDS; Punjabi: ਖ਼ਾਲਸਾ ਦਿਵਾਨ ਸੋਸਾਇਟੀ ਵੈਨਕੂਵਰ) is a Sikh gurdwara organization in Vancouver, British Columbia, Canada.

Founded in 1906, it is the oldest Sikh society in Greater Vancouver, and its original location was the largest gurdwara in North America. The current gurdwara is located at the intersection of Southwest Marine Drive and Ross Street, in South Vancouver.

== History ==
The Khalsa Diwan Society was founded on July 22, 1906, and was registered on March 13, 1909.

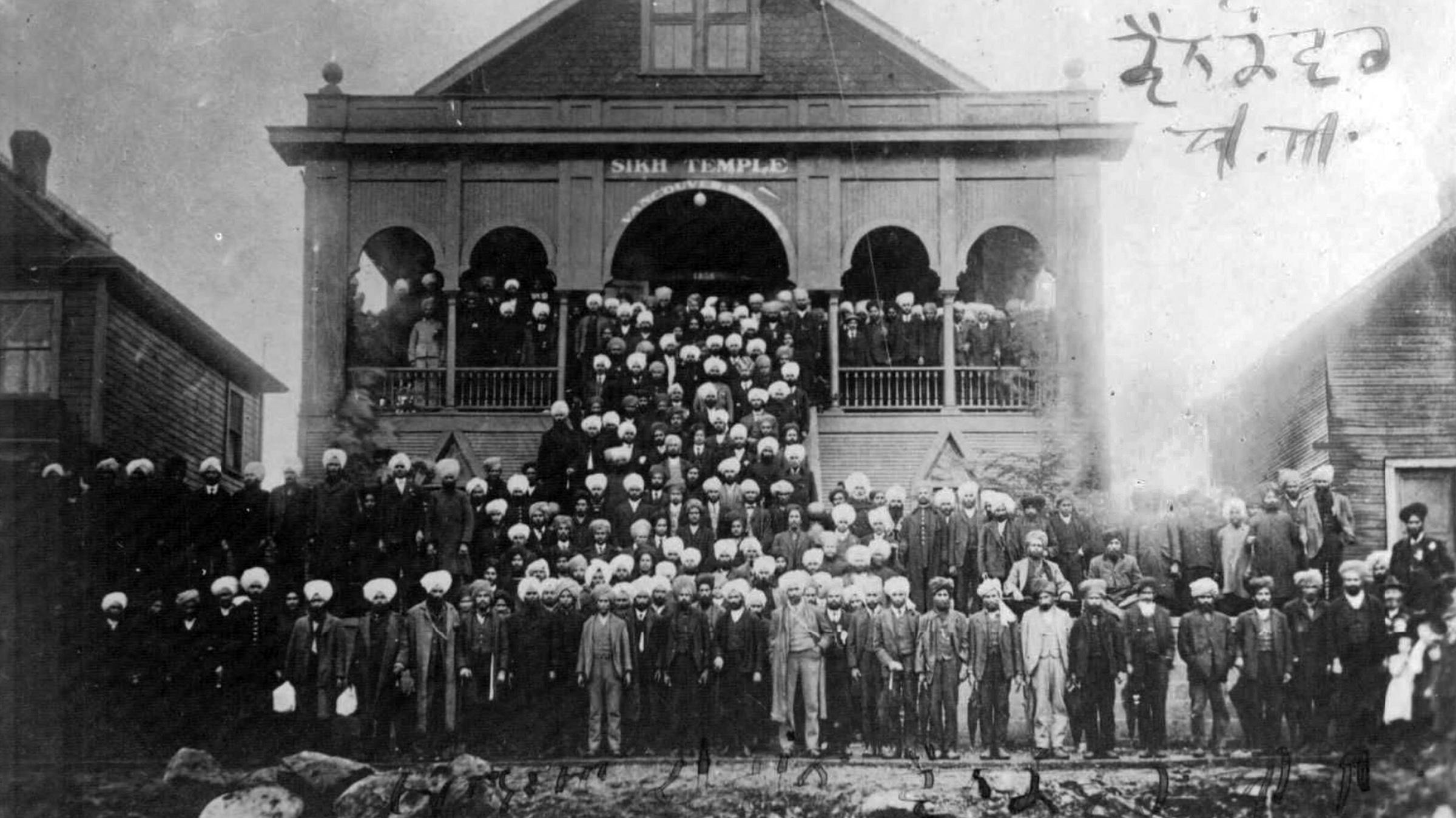
Group photo of Sikh men at the Second Avenue Gurdwara during its opening day, Vancouver, British Columbia, Canada, 19 January 1908

Their first site and gurdwara was built in 1908 at 1866 West 2nd Avenue, inaugurated on January 19. The financial situation of the Society depended on the number of Sikhs living in British Columbia, and donations rose considerably as more Sikhs came to the province. The population of Sikhs rose in the period of 1904–1908 to 5,185, but fell to 2,342 in 1911. The Sikh population dwindled even more, to 1,099, as the year 1918 approached. Verne A. Dusenbery, Professor of Anthropology and Chair of the Global Studies Program at Hamline University in Minnesota, wrote that the gurdwara served as "truly a religious, social, political, cultural, and social service center for the entire South-Asian immigrant population of the lower mainland" during its early history.

In the 1940s, the KDS served in a leadership role as Indo-Canadians demanded for voting rights, and it did so in a secular capacity. The gurdwara had a homeless shelter and a langar or kitchen. The KDS had a secular social role as a community centre and also served Hindus and Muslims among the Indo-Canadian community. Raj Hans Kumar stated that in political affairs the KDS represented all "Hindus", which at the time meant all people of East-Indian origin.

In the early 1950s, a serious split occurred in the Canadian Sikh community, when the Khalsa Diwan Society elected a clean-shaven Sikh to serve on its management committee. Although most of the early Sikh immigrants to Canada were non-Khalsa, and a majority of the members of the society were clean-shaven non-Khalsa Sikhs, a faction objected to the election of a non-Khalsa to the management committee. The factions in Vancouver and Victoria broke away from the Khalsa Diwan Society, and established their own gurdwara society called the Akali Singh Society, which opened in 1952.

=== Relocation ===
KDS Vancouver Gurdwara
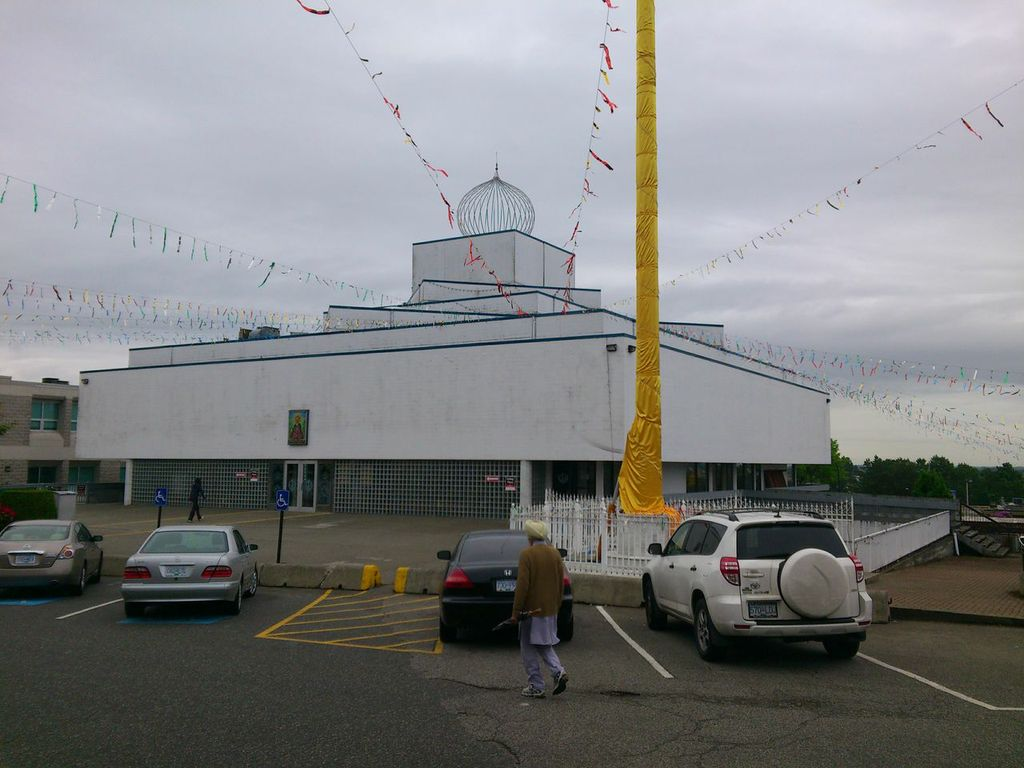

Religion
- Affiliation: Sikhism

Location
- Location: 8000 Ross St, Vancouver, British Columbia, Canada
- Interactive map of KDS Vancouver Gurdwara

Architecture
- Architect: Arthur Erickson
- Established: April 1970

By the late 1950s, there were plans to establish Punjabi-language schools for Canadian-born children and to collect funds for a new community centre. In 1963, the Society began planning for a new gurdwara and community centre.

The Society purchased 2.75 acres (11,100 m^{2}) of city land in 1968 at the intersection of Southwest Marine Drive and Ross Street, in South Vancouver.

Construction began in winter 1969, and was completed in the first week of April 1970 for a price of $6,060. Sri Guru Granth Sahib was moved from the 2nd Avenue gurdwara to the Ross Street gurdwara on the day of Vasakhi 1970. The initial plans asked for a library and community centre, but these aspects were eliminated from the plans. The celebration for Guru Nanak's 500th birthday was held prior to the grand opening in 1970. The building was intended to look like a lotus rising from water. To get inspiration for the style, the architect, Arthur Erickson, traveled to Agra and Amritsar.

In 1979, the annual income of the KDS was $300,000. The membership, which came with a $12 membership fee, had been around 5,000 prior to 1979. After the elimination of the fee, membership increased. That year the leadership of the gurdwara changed. Previously, the KDS was controlled by Marxist Sikhs who did not practice Sikhism. According to Kamala Elizabeth Nayar, in 1984, the pro-Khalistan World Sikh Organization (WSO) began controlling the gurdwara. According to Hugh Johnston, Vancouver Sikhs stated that the political bloc that took charge of the KDS Gurdwara network by 1979 consisted of about 10-15 families.

=== Khalsa Diwan Road ===
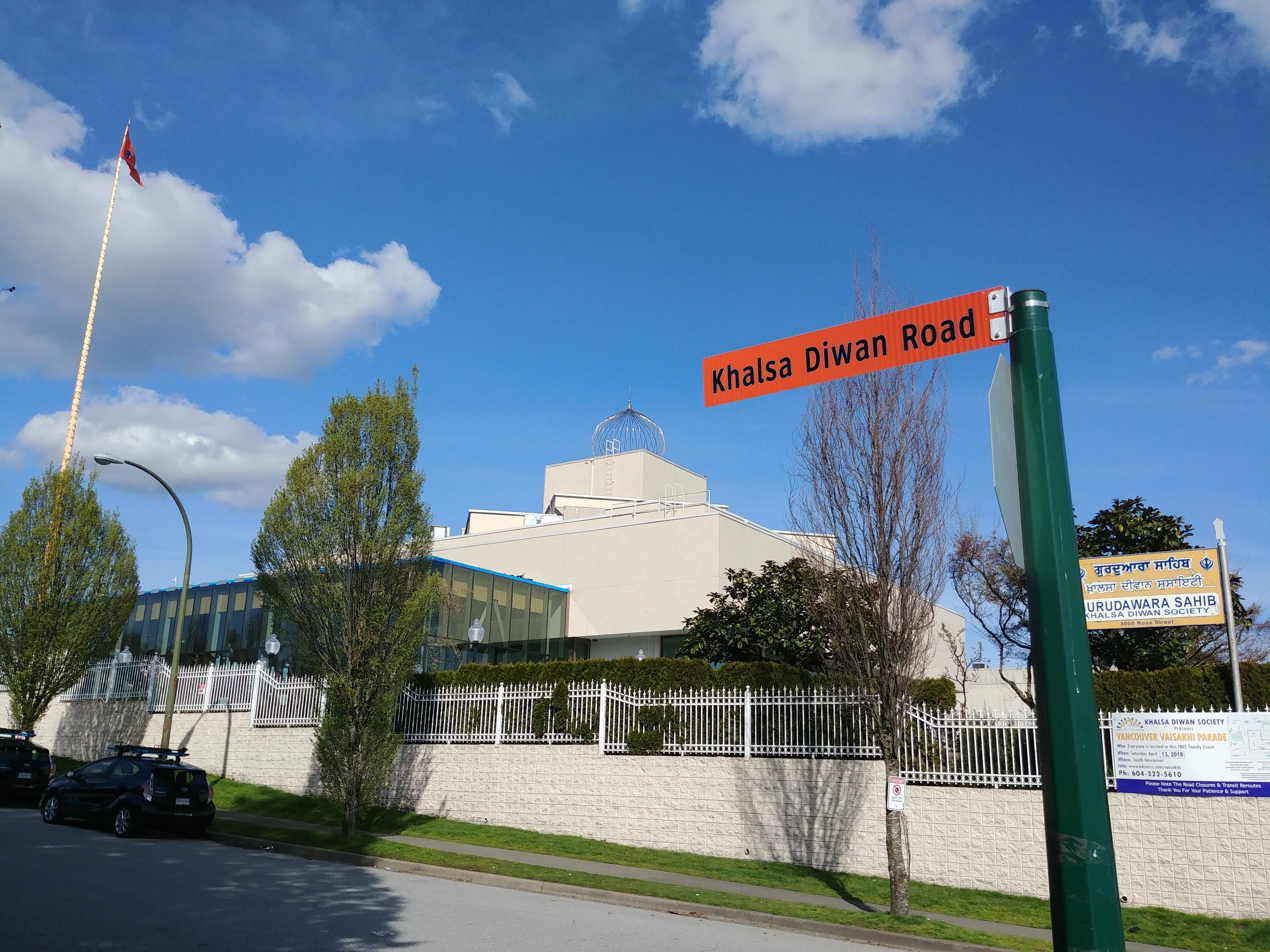
Street sign of Khalsa Diwan Road with the KDS Vancouver Gurdwara in the background

As part of an initiative by Vancouver City Council to commemorate prominent members of the community, Ross Street was alternatively named Khalsa Diwan Road in 2018. Additional street signs marking it as Khalsa Diwan Road were added at from the Gurdwara at SW Marine Drive to 57th Avenue in 2019.

== Branches ==
In the 1960s, the main gurdwara was in Vancouver and the branch gurdwaras were in New Westminster, Abbotsford, Victoria, and Port Alberni.

By 1973, the cities with KDS temples were Abbotsford, Mesachie Lake, New Westminster, Paldi, Port Alberni, and Vancouver. However the New Westminster Khalsa Diwan became its own Sikh society the following year.

In 1975 the Khalsa Diwan Society of Abbotsford also separated, as the title of the Abbotsford gurdwara was transferred to the separated entity. The Abbotsford Sikhs wanted to have local control over their gurdwara, the Gur Sikh Temple.

== Events ==
Every March, a celebration of the martyrdom of Mewa Singh Lopoke is held. Sikhs from California go to the KDS to celebrate the event.

== First executive committee ==
The first executive committee of the Khalsa Diwan Society were members from 1907 to 1909. They included the following.

Title	Person
President	Bhai Sewa Singh
Vice President	Bhai Bhola Singh (Narinder Singh)
Treasurer	Bhai Arjan Singh
Member	Bhai Bhag Singh
Member	Bhai Balwant Singh
Member	Bhai Bhola Singh

== See also ==
- List of places of worship in the Lower Mainland
- Sikhism in Greater Vancouver
- Indo-Canadians in Greater Vancouver
