= King David School, Vancouver =

King David High School
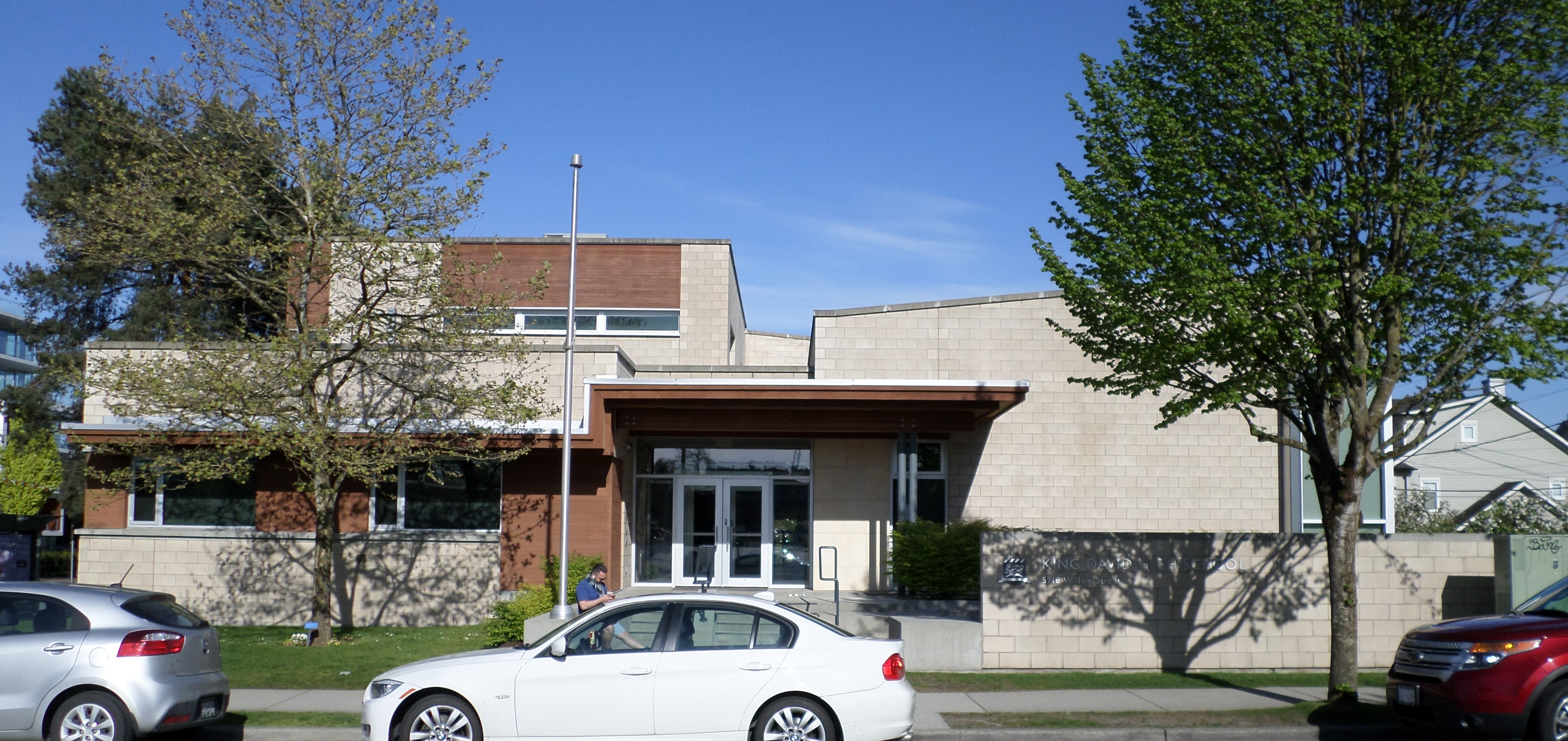
- King David High School in May 2017

Location
- 5718 Willow Street; Vancouver, British Columbia, V5Z 4S9; Canada; 49°14′0.6″N 123°7′23″W

Information
- School type: Independent Jewish day school
- Founded: September 1987; 38 years ago
- Head of school: Seth Goldsweig
- Grades: 8-12
- Enrollment: 269 (10 September 2024)
- Colours: Gold and Blue
- Team name: Lions
- Website: https://www.kdhs.org/

King David High School (Hebrew: בֵּית סֵפֶר תִּיכוֹן הַמֶלֶךְ דָּוִד) is a pluralistic Jewish community high school in Vancouver, British Columbia. The high school offers comprehensive general and Judaic studies programs, enabling students to benefit from both the product and the process of learning.

== History ==
The high school opened as Maimonides Secondary School in September 1987, housed on the upper floor of Schara Tzedeck Synagogue. The school moved to Baillie Street in 1992, and was renamed to Talmud Torah High School in 1998.

In 2005, King David High School opened the doors to a new facility at Willow and 41st Avenue, in close proximity to the Vancouver Jewish Community Centre.

The school continues to receive changes to its interior and exterior structure. Around 2011, the school received a renovation to its library interior. These types of changes will continue to happen for years to come. More recently, the high school has planned to extend the school for 2026, ridding its current backyard.

== Facilities and academics ==
In addition to classrooms, King David High School has two science labs, a music and drama studio, a library, an art room, and a foods room. The high school offers an online schooling/grading system. However, students are still mandatory to enter and use the building throughout their time at King David High School. The school also includes e-mail addresses issued for all staff and students, a library for reading and studying, and many other smart technologies.

A British Columbia Ministry of Education report recognized the teachers for their commitment to individual support and enrichment.
