= Sikhism in Greater Vancouver =

Religious community

- Population distribution of Sikhs in Metro Vancouver by census tract, 2021 census

Total population
- 222,160; 8.5% of the total GV population (2021)

Religions
- Sikhism

Languages
- Canadian English • Punjabi; Canadian French • Hindi • Urdu

Related ethnic groups
- American Sikhs; Australian Sikhs; British Sikhs; Canadian Sikhs; New Zealander Sikhs

Sikhism in Greater Vancouver is one of the main religions across the region, especially among the Indo-Canadian population. The Sikh community in Vancouver is the oldest, largest and most influential across Canada, having begun in the late 19th century.

By 1995, Vancouver had one of the two largest Sikh populations in the world outside of India. In 2003, Sikhs became the largest group in Greater Vancouver who did not practice Christianity. In 2011, there were 155,945 Sikhs in Greater Vancouver, representing 6.8% of the region's population.

As of 2021, the Sikh population in Metro Vancouver is 222,165, forming 8.5% of the total regional population.

== History ==
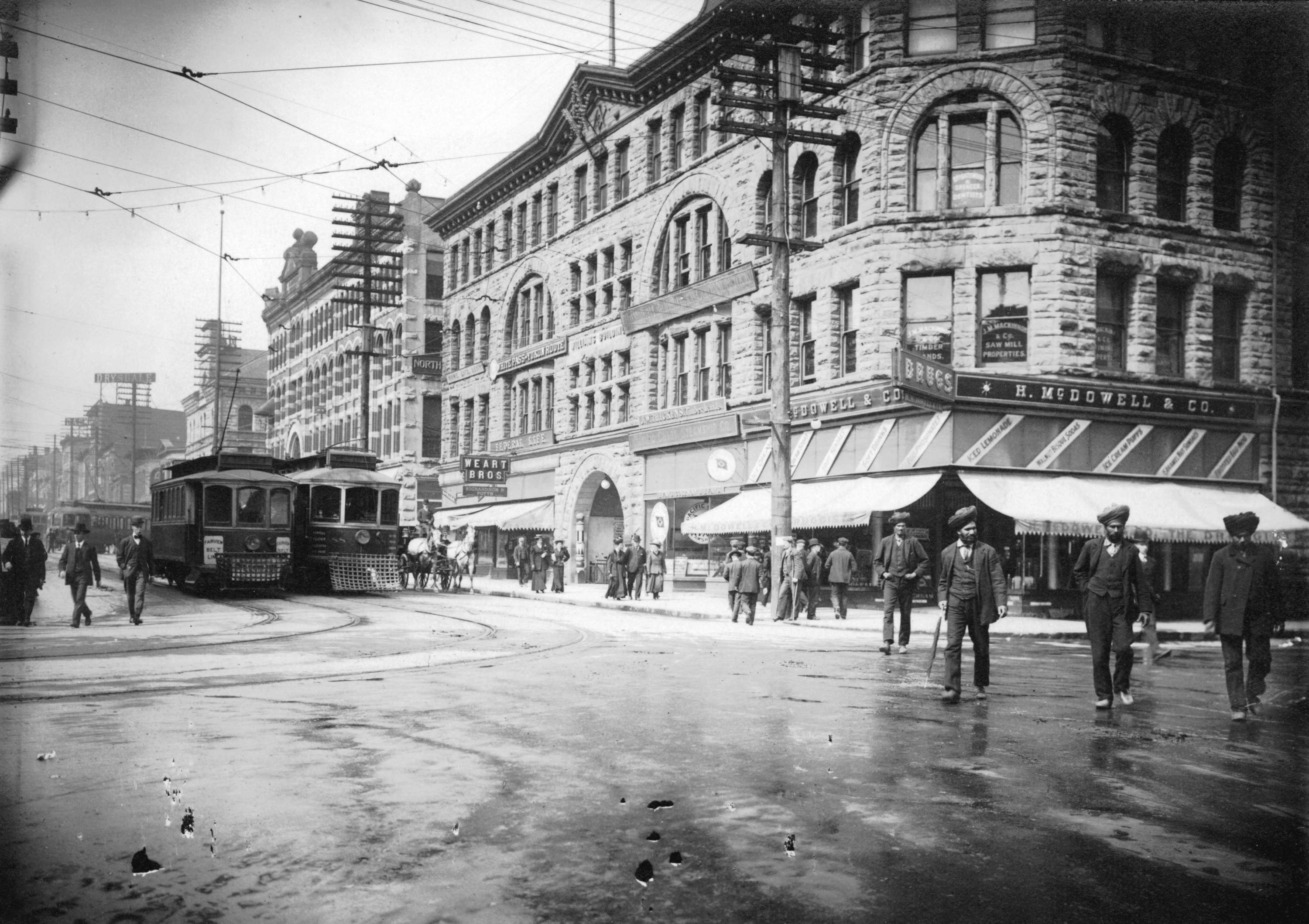
Sikhs on Granville Street in Vancouver, 1908

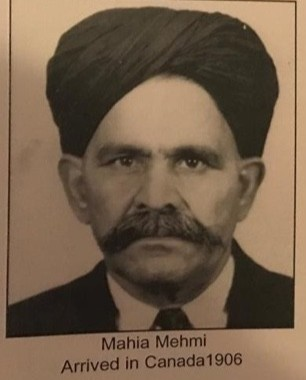
Mahia Mehmi- One of the first Ravidassia Sikh settler in Canada in 1906. He was also co-founder of Khalsa Diwan Society, Vancouver

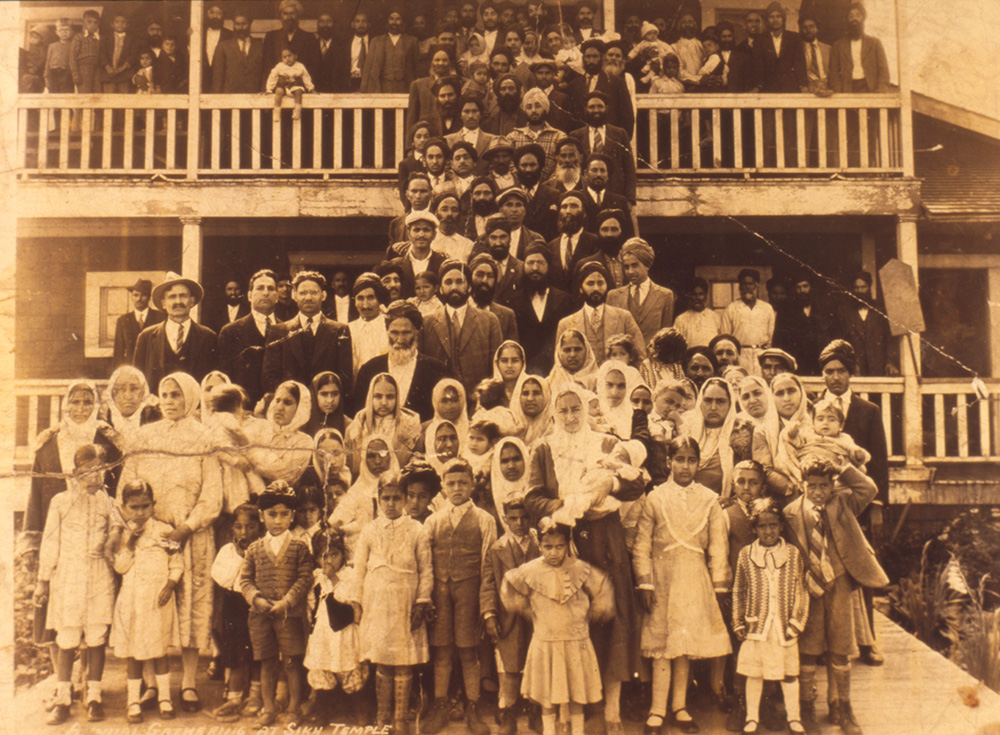
Queensborough, New Westminster Sikh temple, 1931.

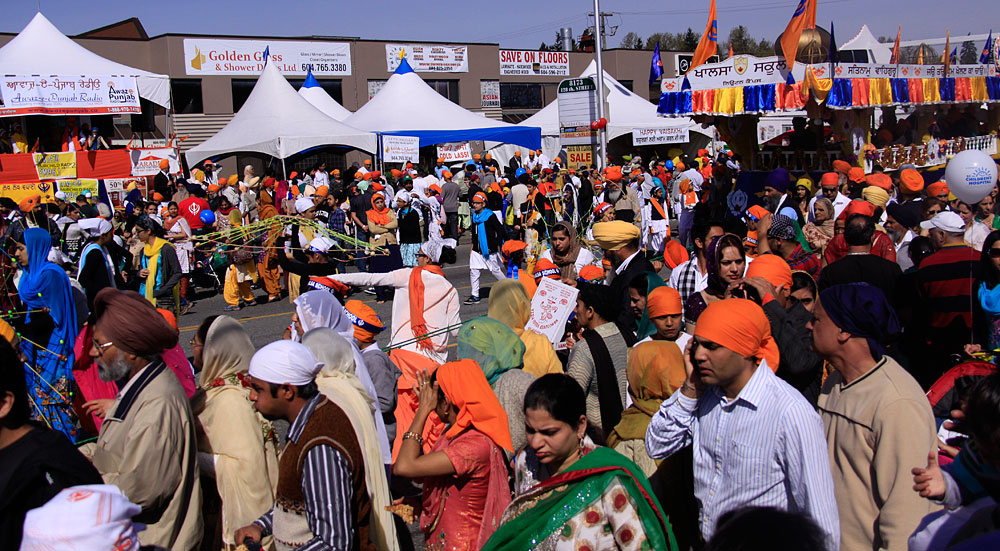
Vaisakhi in Surrey, 2012.

On 3 June 1902, a small contingent of Sikh soldiers from Punjab arrived in Vancouver aboard the Empress of Japan to take part in the Commonwealth-wide celebration of King Edward VII's coronation. These Sikh men were the source of curiosity, especially their turbans. The Sikh men were impressed by the natural beauty of British Columbia, with word spreading back home in the Punjab after their about the prospects of emigrating to British Columbia, leading to the first Sikh pioneers to arrive in Vancouver from then onwards. Between 1904 and 1908, around 5,000 South Asian migrants (almost all men) arrived in British Columbia, with most working in farming or the lumber mills. In 1906, the Khalsa Diwan Society, the first Sikh-Canadian organization, was established. In 1906, discrimination against Sikhs became ingrained, such as targeted eviction and exclusion from public facilities. The first Sikh temple, a gurdwara, was erected at Second Avenue in Vancouver, which opened its doors to worshippers on 19 January 1908. This temple would serve as a centre for the Sikh community for decades.

Sikh Population History in Metro Vancouver
Year	Pop.	±%
1981	22,390	—
1991	49,625	+121.6%
2001	99,005	+99.5%
2011	155,945	+57.5%
2021	222,165	+42.5%
Source: Statistics Canada

At the turn of the century the Mayor of Vancouver did not permit cremation, so when the first Sikh died in 1907, he could not be cremated in the Vancouver city limits. Christian missionaries did not permit him to be buried with whites. Even though the missionaries promoted burial, the Sikhs instead cremated the man in a distant wilderness. This prompted Sikhs to establish their own religious institutions. In 1912, the mayor of Vancouver wrote that Sikhs "are not suited to the country. ... They are immoral and quarrelsome and have not the stamina enough to become good workers", with him contradictorily concluding that the economic success of Sikhs posed a danger to White-Canadian workers. In 1914, the Vancouverite-Sikh community donated provisions, including food, to the passengers of the Komagata Maru to show solidarity with its passengers.

Beginning in the 1930s, within the Vancouver area, many clean-shaven, or sahajdhari, Sikhs began hanging up their hats and entering the gurdwaras with uncovered heads (an akin to men leaving their hats on while attending Christian churches). Turban-wearing, or kesdhari, Sikhs objected to this practice.

Until the 1960s Sikh religious organizations were the primary political interest groups of the Indo-Canadian community in the Vancouver region. At that time there were three gurdwaras in Metro Vancouver: the two Khalsa Diwan Society (KDS) gurdwaras in Vancouver and New Westminster, and the Akali Singh gurdwara in Vancouver. In 1970, the original building of the first Sikh temple on the Second Avenue in Vancouver was sold and demolished and the temple was shifted to a newly-constructed building off of Southeast Marine Drive in Vancouver. The political structure of the Sikh community began to shift in the early 1970s since newcomers to politics began vying for influence against established political leaders as immigration increased the size of the community. In 1981 there were 22,392 Sikhs in Vancouver, virtually all of them being ethnic Punjabi. That year, Dusenbery wrote that the maturation of Punjabi Sikhs who were children of immigrants, the increase in immigration, and the rise of gora (White) Sikh converts from Canada and the United States changed the character of the Vancouver Sikh community in the period 1971-1981. Several turbanned Sikhs began criticizing the practice of entering gurdwaras with uncovered heads in the 1970s. By 1977, Vancouver's Sikh community, along with that of the Greater Toronto Area, were one of the two largest Canadian Sikh communities.

Organizations that favored the establishment of Khalistan began assuming control of Greater Vancouver gurdwaras after Operation Bluestar occurred in 1984. In 1988 Hugh Johnston wrote that in regards to the city's Punjabi community, "being Punjabi is coming to mean, exclusively, being Sikh", and that "it seems likely that Punjabi culture" in Vancouver would be exclusively "an aspect of Sikh identity" and exclude Hindus, who disagreed on the Khalistan issue.

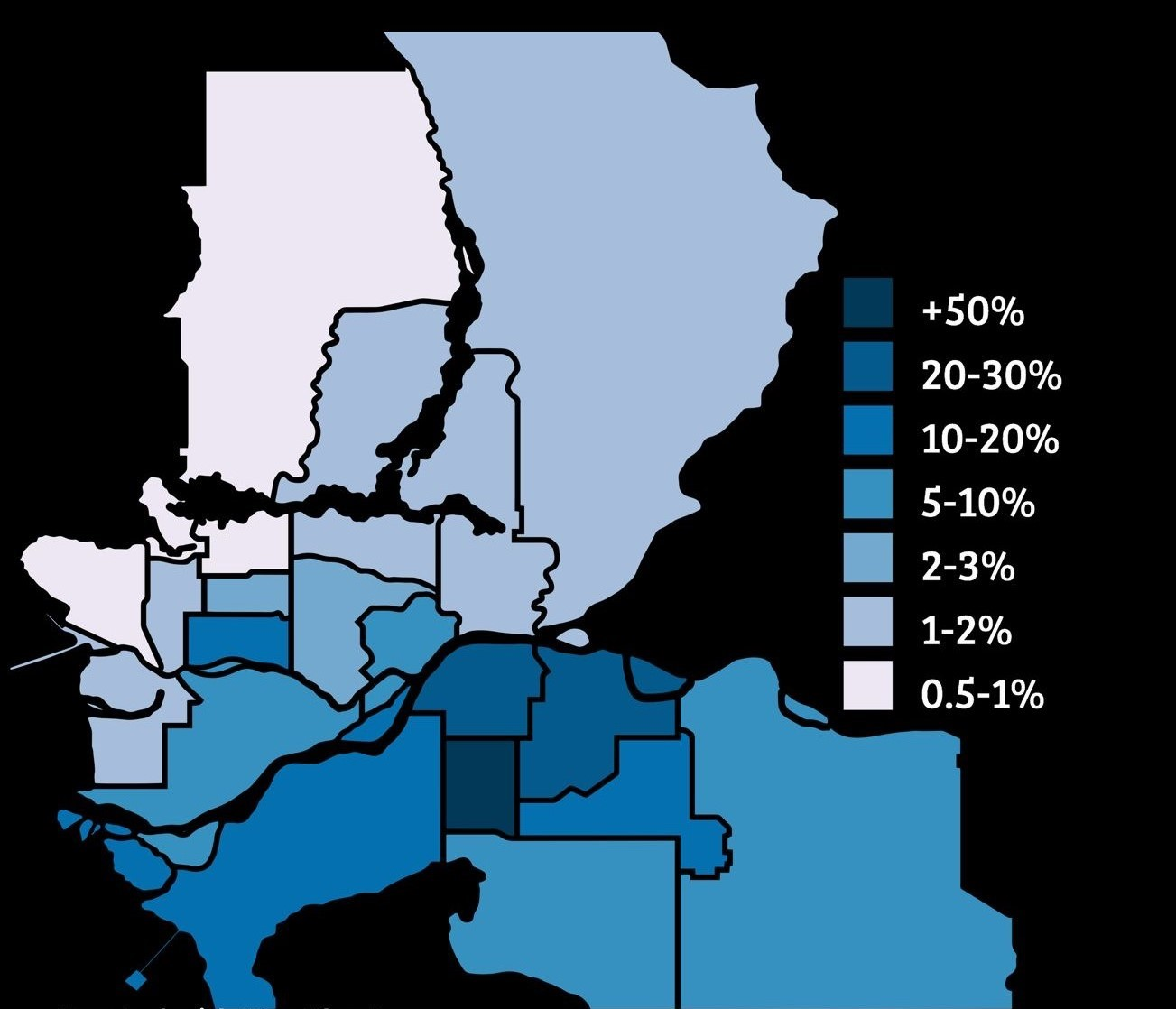
Population distribution of Sikh Canadians in Vancouver by federal electoral district, 2021 census

Around 1995 moderate Sikhs politically challenged more extremist Sikhs in gurdwaras in Vancouver and Surrey. A December 1996 attack on the Guru Nanak temple in Surrey led by extremists and a January 1997 fight occurred. The Ross Street Sikh temple still is in operation and the headquarters of the Khalsa Diwan Society is located next door to it.

== Varieties of Sikhism ==
Hugh Johnston, in 1988, wrote that there are political divisions and religious divisions within the Sikh community of Vancouver. In 2008 Elizabeth Kamala Nayar stated that Vancouver media reporting on orthodox Sikhs is often negative and that orthodox Sikhs "are portrayed negatively as ‘backward’ and ‘violent’." She also stated that journalists of mainstream publications in Canada often conflate "fundamentalist" Sikhism with the pro-Khalistan movement and "moderate" Sikhism with those opposed to the Khalistan movement; she explained that this occurred when the publications discussed religious conflicts in the Sikh community Vancouver as well as conflicts involving Sikhs throughout Canada. Nayar added that in Vancouver the wearing of turbans often is associated with Sikh fundamentalism.

Gora Sikhs (White Sikhs) are present in Greater Vancouver. Many have attempted to gain involvement with Punjabi Sikhs. In her book The Sikh Diaspora in Vancouver: Three Generations Amid Tradition, Modernity, and Multiculturalism, Nayar wrote that "For the most part, the Gora Sikh community functions separately from the Punjabi Sikh community." Some Gora Sikhs have criticized a focus on Indian politics and the factionalism within Punjabi Sikh gurdwaras.

== Geographical distribution ==
=== Subdivisions ===
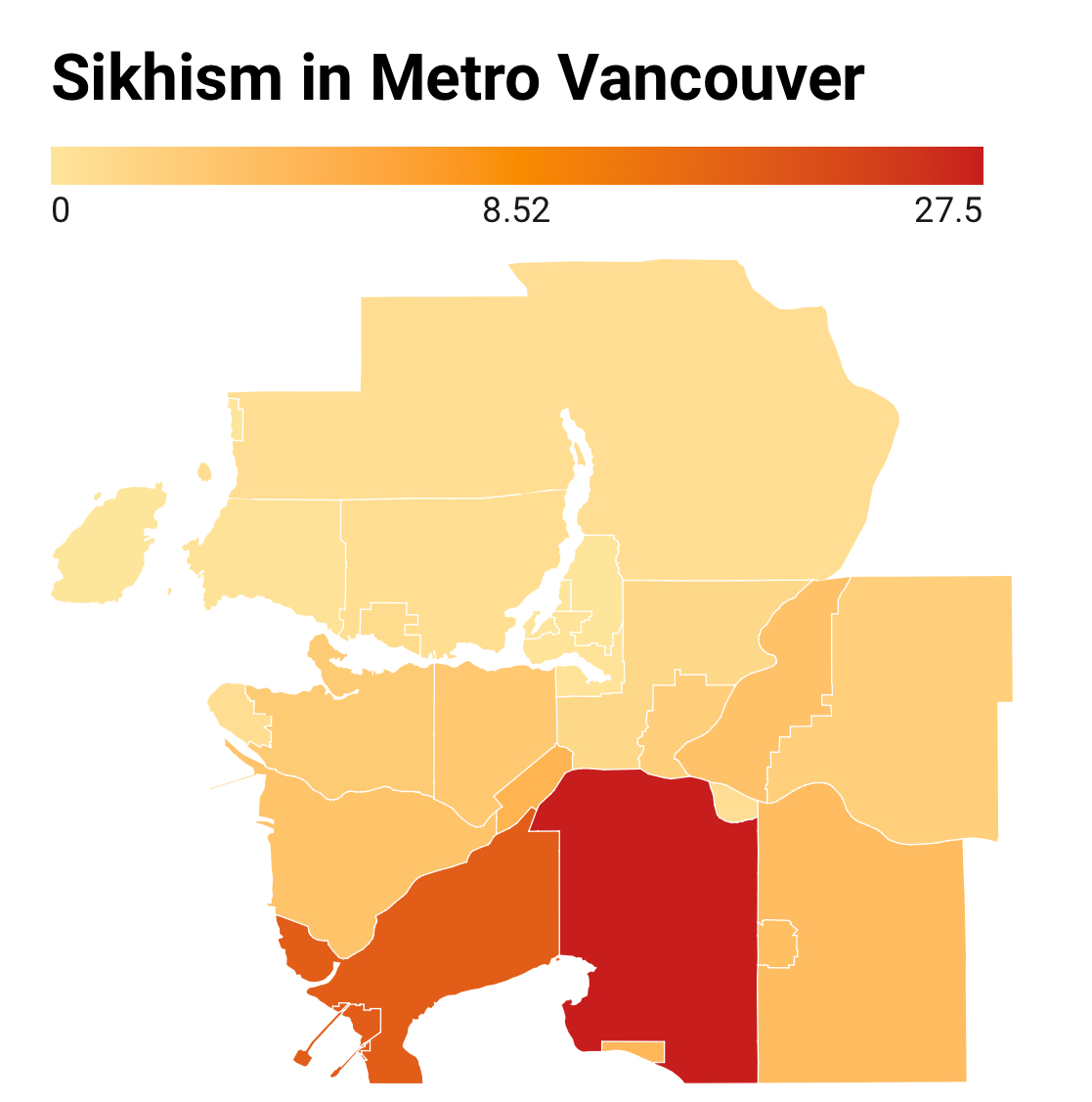
Sikhism percent in Metro Vancouver by municipality, 2021 census

Sikh Canadians by subdivisions in Metro Vancouver (1981–2021)
Subdivision	2021		2011		2001		1991		1981 (Note: Note: 1981 census religious breakdown for all subdivisions includes an "Eastern Non-Christian" section. Estimates derived using the Sikh proportion of Eastern Non-Christian religious total from the 1991 census.)	
Subdivision	Pop.	%	Pop.	%	Pop.	%	Pop.	%	Pop.	%
Surrey	154,415	27.45%	104,720	22.6%	56,325	16.29%	20,905	8.59%	3,950	2.7%
Delta	19,235	17.93%	10,495	10.63%	8,255	8.57%	3,695	4.18%	1,565	2.11%
Vancouver	16,535	2.54%	16,815	2.85%	15,200	2.82%	12,935	2.78%	10,055	2.46%
Richmond	6,985	3.35%	7,155	3.78%	5,755	3.52%	4,500	3.57%	2,285	2.38%
Burnaby	6,905	2.81%	6,395	2.9%	5,625	2.94%	3,370	2.15%	2,025	1.51%
Langley (District)	5,170	3.95%	1,965	1.91%	1,055	1.22%	300	0.46%	320	0.72%
New Westminster	3,750	4.8%	2,920	4.49%	2,720	5.05%	1,025	2.4%	770	2.07%
Maple Ridge	1,925	2.14%	870	1.16%	695	1.11%	390	0.81%	165	0.52%
Coquitlam	1,855	1.26%	1,430	1.14%	985	0.88%	625	0.76%	330	0.56%
Port Coquitlam	1,335	2.21%	1,260	2.26%	805	1.58%	595	1.63%	280	1.03%
Langley (City)	1,045	3.73%	35	0.14%	50	0.21%	125	0.64%	50	0.34%
White Rock	905	4.37%	85	0.46%	35	0.2%	65	0.42%	85	0.65%
Pitt Meadows	640	3.36%	560	3.16%	670	4.57%	370	3.32%	115	1.85%
North Vancouver (district)	550	0.63%	430	0.51%	400	0.49%	300	0.4%	190	0.29%
North Vancouver (City)	530	0.92%	375	0.79%	265	0.6%	340	0.89%	150	0.45%
West Vancouver	135	0.31%	115	0.27%	120	0.29%	15	0.04%	10	0.03%
Metro Vancouver Subdivision A	105	0.61%	145	1.17%	20	0.26%	0	0%	0	0%
Port Moody	80	0.24%	180	0.55%	20	0.08%	65	0.37%	45	0.3%
Bowen Island	0	0%	5	0.15%	0	0%	—N/a	—N/a	—N/a	—N/a
Anmore	0	0%	0	0%	0	0%	0	0%	—N/a	—N/a
Lions Bay	0	0%	0	0%	0	0%	0	0%	0	0%
Belcarra	0	0%	0	0%	0	0%	0	0%	0	0%
Vancouver CMA	222,165	8.52%	155,945	6.84%	99,005	5.03%	49,625	3.13%	22,390	1.79%

=== Federal electoral districts ===
==== 2012 boundaries ====
Sikh Canadians by federal electoral districts in Metro Vancouver (2011–2021)
Riding	2021		2011	
Riding	Population	Percentage	Population	Percentage
Surrey—Newton	62,340	51.47%	46,320	44.35%
Surrey Centre	36,070	27.74%	26,035	23.69%
Fleetwood—Port Kells	30,380	24.5%	21,435	19.64%
Delta	19,270	17.61%	10,490	10.55%
Cloverdale—Langley City	18,745	14.46%	7,405	7.41%
Vancouver South	10,775	9.98%	11,895	12.01%
South Surrey—White Rock	9,410	8.07%	3,945	4.29%
Langley—Aldergrove	7,500	5.72%	3,135	3.09%
New Westminster—Burnaby	6,275	5.1%	5,575	5.22%
Steveston—Richmond East	5,285	5.2%	5,525	5.75%
Burnaby South	3,330	2.79%	2,905	2.79%
Pitt Meadows—Maple Ridge	2,570	2.35%	1,425	1.53%
Vancouver Kingsway	2,435	2.27%	2,690	2.65%
Coquitlam—Port Coquitlam	1,815	1.39%	1,680	1.53%
Richmond Centre	1,700	1.59%	1,635	1.75%
Port Moody—Coquitlam	1,495	1.31%	1,195	1.12%
Vancouver Granville	1,260	1.16%	825	0.84%
Burnaby North—Seymour	1,220	1.14%	975	0.98%
North Vancouver	905	0.74%	665	0.61%
Vancouver Centre	895	0.72%	530	0.52%
Vancouver Quadra	665	0.62%	630	0.63%
Vancouver East	610	0.54%	390	0.38%
Vancouver CMA	222,165	8.52%	155,945	6.84%
Note: Based on 2012 Canadian federal electoral redistribution riding boundaries.

==== 2003 boundaries ====
Sikh Canadians by federal electoral districts in Metro Vancouver (2001–2011)
Riding	2011		2001	
Riding	Population	Percentage	Population	Percentage
Newton—North Delta	44,745	35.05%	30,610	27.61%
Fleetwood—Port Kells	32,860	20.7%	13,025	12.93%
Surrey North	31,185	25.05%	18,845	17.76%
Vancouver South	12,085	9.96%	10,360	9.3%
Burnaby—New Westminster	6,900	5.29%	6,645	6.05%
Delta—Richmond East	6,130	5.57%	5,530	5.4%
South Surrey—White Rock—Cloverdale	5,605	4.49%	1,195	1.22%
Pitt Meadows—Maple Ridge—Mission	3,520	2.71%	2,920	2.68%
Vancouver Kingsway	3,040	2.45%	3,680	3.22%
Burnaby—Douglas	2,155	1.77%	1,450	1.35%
Langley	2,000	1.56%	1,100	1%
Richmond	1,935	1.55%	1,175	1.11%
Port Moody—Westwood—Port Coquitlam	1,770	1.37%	1,255	1.15%
New Westminster—Coquitlam	1,360	1.13%	805	0.75%
Vancouver Quadra	820	0.68%	420	0.38%
North Vancouver	780	0.62%	660	0.55%
Vancouver Centre	620	0.46%	340	0.32%
Vancouver East	390	0.38%	415	0.39%
Vancouver CMA	155,945	6.84%	99,005	5.03%
Note: Based on 2003 Canadian federal electoral redistribution riding boundaries.

== Gurdwaras ==
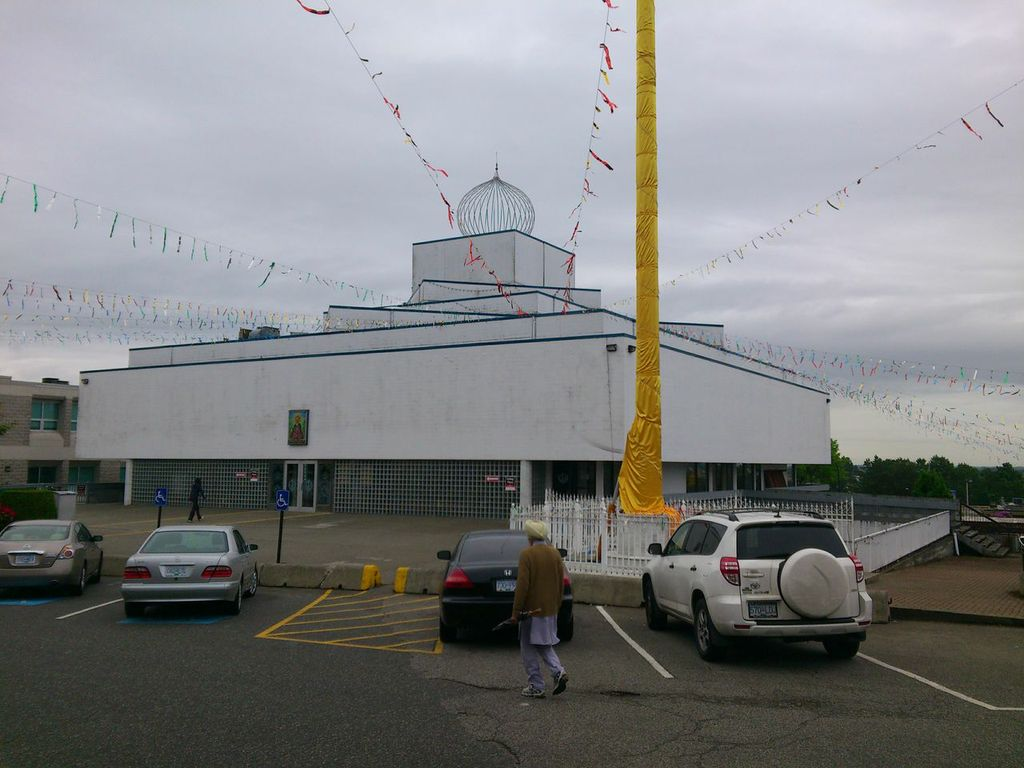
Khalsa Diwan Society Vancouver

Sikh gurdwaras (Sikh places of worship) in Vancouver were the city's only community centres for the Indo-Canadians until the 1960s. This meant that the gurdwaras at the time also gave social outlets to Punjabi Hindus and other South Asians. By 1981, gurdwaras mainly filled religious purposes. Many major gurdwaras in Greater Vancouver were initially established in isolated areas, but these areas over time became urbanized.

Sikhs often selected gurdwaras due to religious beliefs, family ties, political beliefs, and/or social reasons, and these were not necessarily gurdwaras that were the closest to them.

By 1988 there were six gurdwaras within a 16-kilometre (10 mi) radius in one area in Vancouver. Four new gurdwaras opened in Metro Vancouver in the 1980s.

=== Gurdwaras in Vancouver ===
The first gurdwara in Vancouver opened in 1908. It was founded by the Khalsa Diwan Society (KDS), which was established in 1906, This gurdwara was originally on West 2nd Avenue. making it Vancouver's oldest Sikh Society. In 1969 it moved to the intersection of Southwest Marine Drive and Ross Street, in South Vancouver.

The Akali Singh Gurdwara is in East Vancouver, along Skeena Street. It opened in 1952 in response to a religious dispute. Around the time it opened, the Akali Singh Gurdwara did not permit people who had no facial hair from being a part of its management committee, but it allowed them to be a part of the auditing committee. The construction of the current gurdwara, valued at 1.5-2 million dollars, began construction in 1981. Previously the revenue of the Akali Singh gurdwara was equal to that of the KDS, but around the time of the new gurdwara construction, a takeover of the gurdwara was attempted. The gurdwara prevented an internal takeover by restricting election participation to persons who were not members of other Sikh societies. As a result, a severe membership split occurred and the size was reduced. The Akali Singh was opposed to the KDS, which had a more militant attitude towards the Khalistan question.

Around 1975, a Marxist–Leninist Sikh group purchased the Desh Baghat Mandir centre on Main Street after a failed attempt to seize control of other gurdwaras.

=== Gurdwaras in suburbs and other municipalities ===
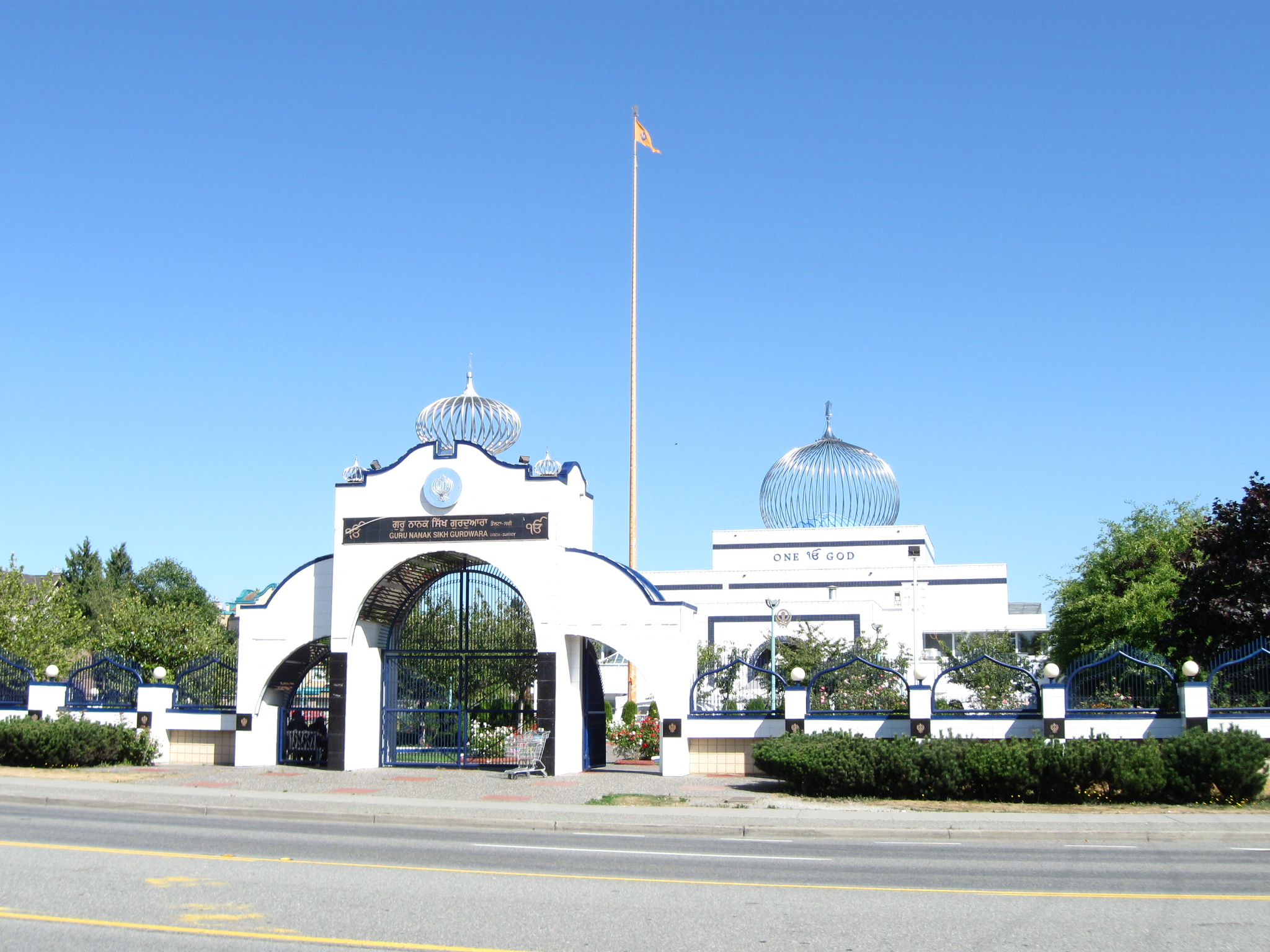
Guru Nanak Sikh Gurdwara Delta-Surrey

Most South Asians in Surrey, as of 2001, are Sikhs. The Guru Nanak Sikh Gurdwara is on Scott Road in the City of Surrey. As of 2011 in regards to its orthodoxy it is a "moderate" gurdwara. As of 2004 it had 37,000 members, making it one of North America's largest Sikh temples. Dasmesh Darbar Gurdwara is an orthodox gurdwara in Surrey.

The Guru Nanak Sikh Gurdwara was established in North Delta in 1973 by the Guru Nanak Sikh Society in order to serve the around 200 Sikh families living in the Surrey-Delta area. The society itself, the Guru Nanak Sikh Temple Society of Delta Surrey, opened that year. The current facility opened in 1981 along Scott Road in Surrey. Due to opposition to the gurdwara from non-Sikhs in Delta, the Delta city government asked the Guru Nanakh Sikh Society to build the new gurdwara in the Surrey side of a property that had been purchased by the society in 1973. In exchange the Delta city government gave access to the Delta sewage system. As of 1988 it was largest Greater Vancouver gurdwara building. The gurdwara was receiving a level income slightly below those of the two largest Vancouver-area gurdwaras by 1979. Around 1984 the International Sikh Youth Federation (ISYF) took control of the Guru Nanakh Gurdwara. The ISYF was a daughter organization of the World Sikh Organization (WSO), which controlled the KDS. According to Hugh Johnston, as of 1988 the gurdwara "probably" had the second largest membership in Greater Vancouver, after the KDS. In January 1998 a coalition of anti-ISYF Sikhs and Sikhs who favored the Indian Congress wrested power away from the ISYF.

The KDS had its own branch gurdwara in New Westminster. In 1974, the New Westminster Khalsa Diwan became its own Sikh society. Another gurdwara had opened 8 km (5 mi) west of the KDS New Westminster and as a result the gurdwara lost membership, but it continued to operate. Hugh Johnston stated that in the 1970s the KDS New Westminster had a "sizeable income".

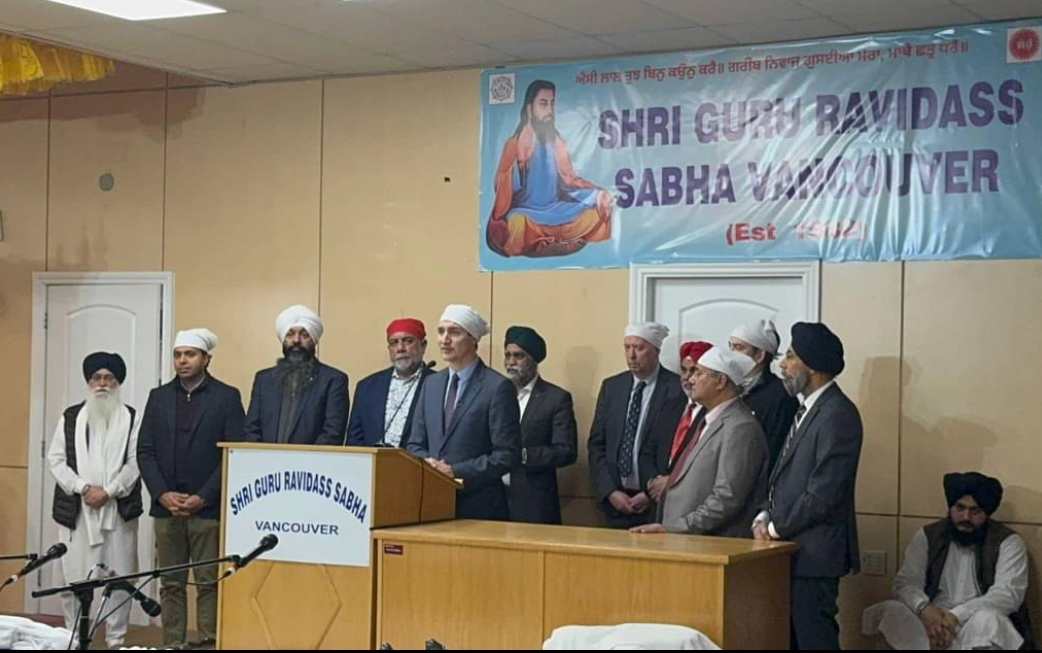
Canadian Prime Minister Justin Trudeau at Guru Ravidass Temple, Vancouver

The gurdwara of the New Westminster Society is in Richmond. The previous membership followed Baba Mihan Singh, an individual from Doaba who had been invited to attend the New Westminster Society after he arrived in Vancouver; the New Westminster Society had employed one of his relatives as a priest. In 1979 the Nananksar Gurdwara, established by followers of Baba Mihan Singh, was being established, sapping membership from the New Westminster Society. As of 1989, the group controlling the KDS also controlled the New Westminster Society. Since 1984 the Nanaksar Gurdwara attracted Sikhs who were uninterested in politics.

The Shri Guru Ravidass Sabha Temple is a Ravidassia gurdwara in Burnaby. It opened in 1982. As of 2008, there were more than 900 members in gurdwara management and currently around 25,000 people of Ravidassia origin living in the Lower Mainland. Two Jats filed a complaint with the British Columbia Human Rights Tribunal after they were denied membership, but the tribunal ruled that the gurdwara was minority-serving and had the right to reject the Jats.

== See also ==
- List of Canadian Sikhs
- Sikhism in Canada
- Anti-Sikh sentiment in Canada
- South Asian Canadians in Greater Vancouver
- South Asian Canadians in British Columbia
