= All Saints Monastery =

Building in British Columbia, Canada

Coordinates: 49.1712°N 122.1948°W

All Saints Monastery is an Orthodox Christian Monastery in Dewdney, British Columbia, Canada. It was founded in 1968. After visiting Mount Athos in 1968, Lev Puhalo and Vasili Novakshonoff came up with the idea of building an Orthodox Monastery in Canada. Since both men already had experience of the monastic life, they decided to attempt the foundation of a monastic house and aid in the advancement of a Canadian Orthodox reality

== See also ==
- Westminster Abbey (British Columbia)
- List of places of worship in the Lower Mainland
