= Gur Sikh Temple =

Sikh temple in Abbotsford, British Columbia

Coordinates: 49°03′04″N 122°18′25″W

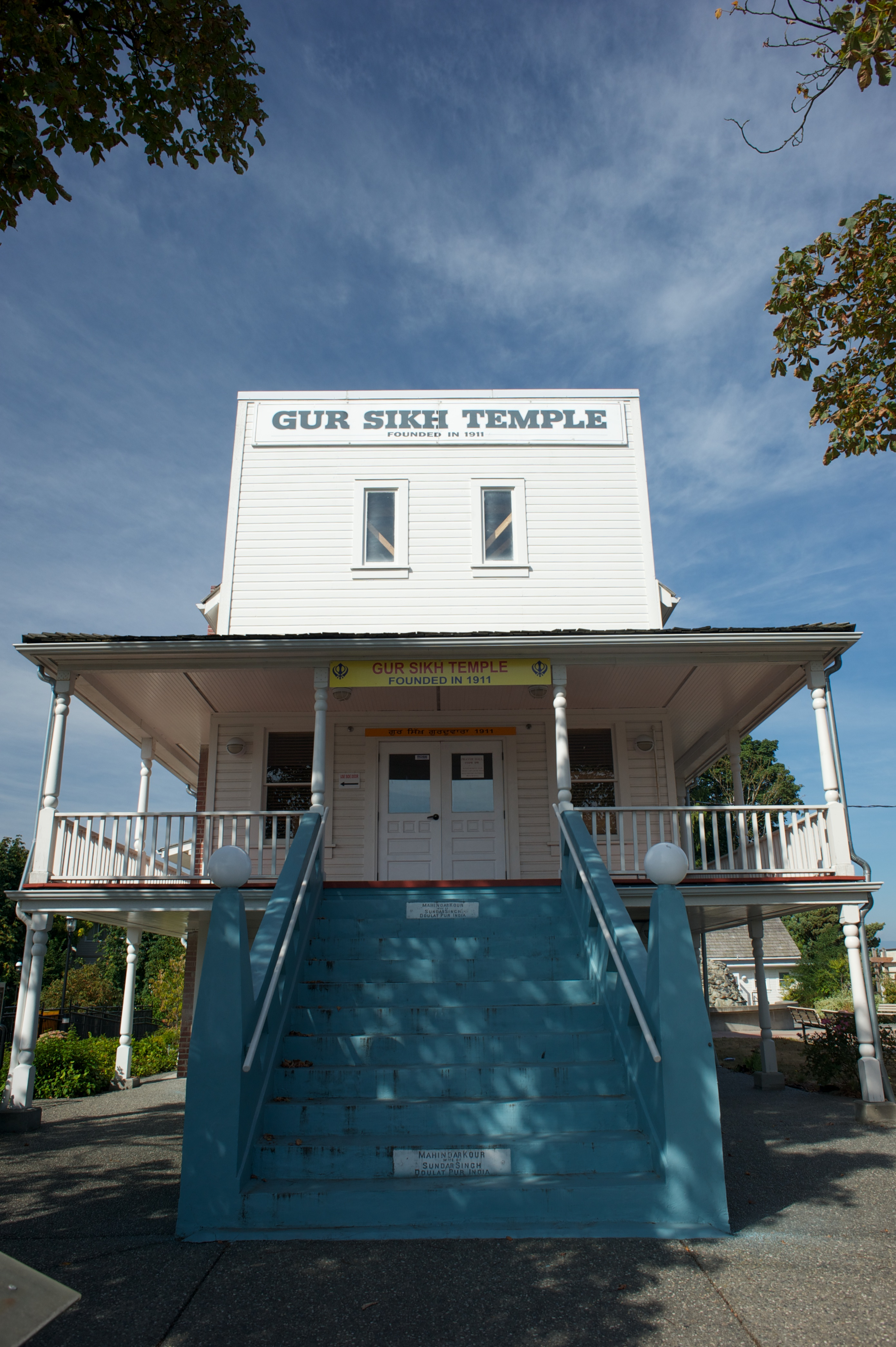

Religion
- Affiliation: Sikhism

Location
- Location: Abbotsford, British Columbia
- Interactive map of Gur Sikh Temple

Architecture
- Established: February 26, 1911; 115 years ago
- National Historic Site of Canada
- Official name: Abbotsford Sikh Temple National Historic Site of Canada
- Designated: July 26, 2002

Website
- http://www.canadiansikhheritage.ca/en/node/16

The Gur Sikh Temple (Punjabi: ਗੁਰ ਸਿੱਖ਼ ਗੁਰਦੁਵਾਰਾ; also known as Abbotsford Sikh Temple), in Abbotsford, British Columbia, is the oldest existing Sikh gurdwara in North America and a National Historic Site of Canada. It is the only gurdwara outside of India and Pakistan that is designated as national historic site.

Though the oldest existing Gurdwara on the continent, having opened in 1911, it is the third-oldest to be built in Canada and North America. The first Gurdwara in Canada was built by early Sikh-Canadian settlers in Golden, British Columbia in 1905, which would later be destroyed by fire in 1926. Meanwhile, the second-oldest Gurdwara to be built in Canada opened in 1908 in Kitsilano (Vancouver), aimed at serving a growing number of Sikh settlers who worked at nearby sawmills along False Creek at the time. It would later be closed and demolished in 1970, with the temple society relocating to the newly built Gurdwara on Ross Street in South Vancouver.

== History ==
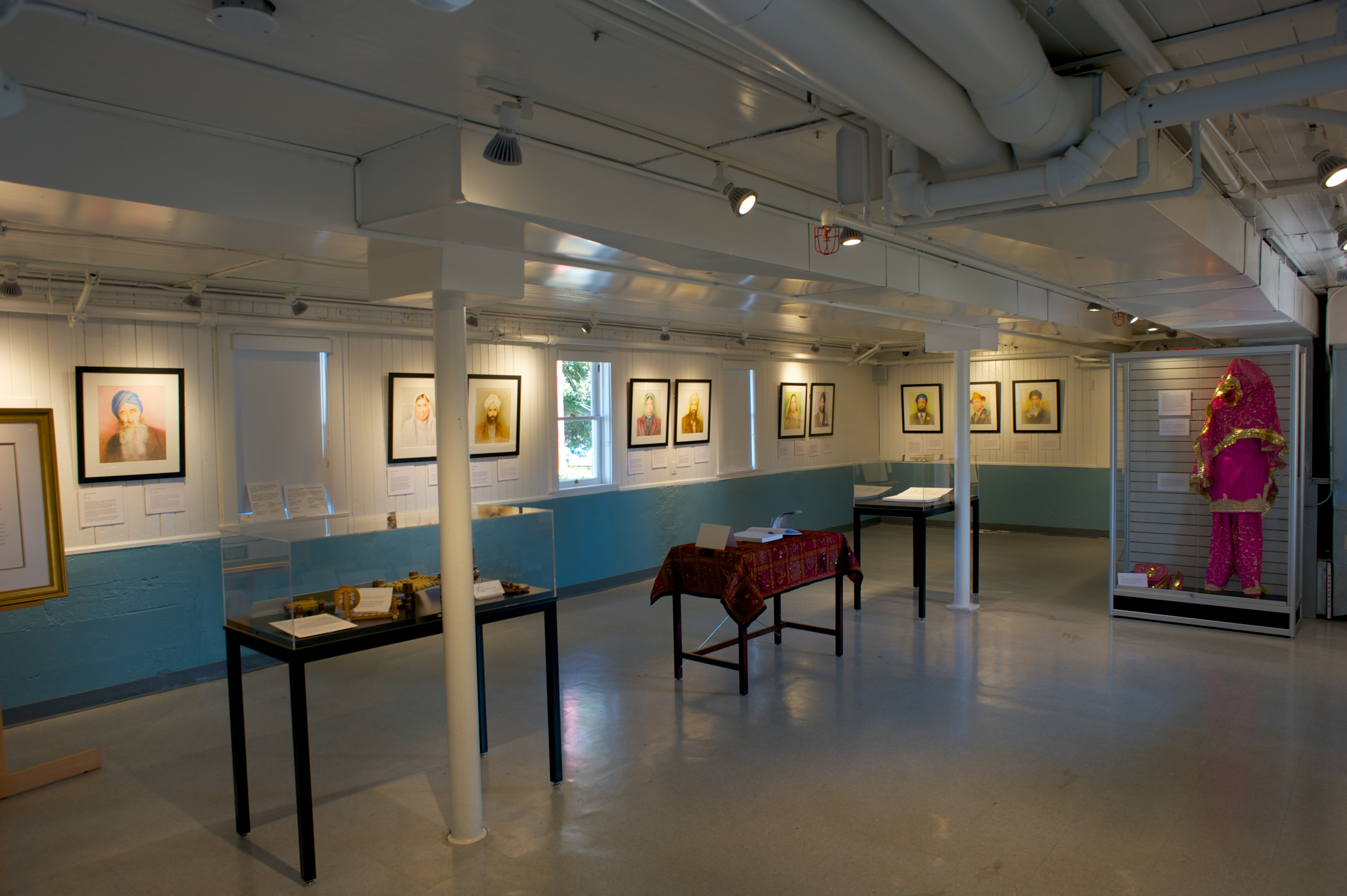
Gur Sikh Temple

The first Sikh pioneers came to the Abbotsford area in 1905 and originally worked on farms and in the lumber industry. First plans to build a gurudwara were made in 1908. After a property situated on a hill was acquired, the settlers carried lumber from a local mill on their backs up a hill to construct the gurdwara.

When the Gurdwara opened on February 26, 1911, Sikhs and non-Sikhs from across British Columbia attended the ceremony and a local newspaper reported on the event. The temple was a two-floor building that from the outside looked like the contemporary wood houses often seen in local frontier towns. Features and decoration typical for Sikh architecture and design were only used in the interior. The first floor contains the Langar and common dining room for the community, and the second floor contains the prayer hall. The building was extended twice in 1932 and in the 1960s. Until 1975 the Gurdwara belonged to the Khalsa Diwan Society Vancouver (founded in 1905), then it was transferred to the Khalsa Diwan Society Abbotsford, who wished for greater autonomy. In 1983, a new, much larger temple with a completely different architectural style was built on the opposite side of the road. The old temple was designated a National Historic Site in 2002, with the designation declared by Prime Minister Jean Chretien at a ceremony on July 26. In 2007, the temple reopened after renovation. For 2011, a small museum in the basement was planned in connection with the temple's 100-year anniversary. To mark the centennial (1911-2011) of Gur Sikh Temple, Prime Minister Stephen Harper inaugurated the Sikh Heritage Museum on the ground floor of the Temple.

Logo of the Gur Sikh Temple

On May 19, 2017, Prime Minister Justin Trudeau visited the Canada 150 exhibit at the Sikh Heritage Museum.

== See also ==
- Sikhism in Canada
- Sikhism in Greater Vancouver
