= Samuel Cass =

Canadian rabbi

Samuel Cass (1 May 1908–1975) was a Canadian rabbi. He "was among the first Canadian-born rabbis to occupy a Canadian pulpit".

Born in Toronto, Cass studied at the City College of New York and the Jewish Theological Seminary. He served as rabbi at the Congregation Beth Israel in Vancouver from 1933 until 1941. He briefly served a congregation in Seattle before enlisting as a chaplain in the Canadian Army during the Second World War. After the liberation of Belgium he organized a Hanukkah party for Jewish orphans in Antwerp. He also delivered Shabbat services for survivors at Westerbork.

After leaving the army, Cass became director of the B'nai B'rith Hillel Foundation at McGill University. He later worked at the Miriam Home for the Exceptional in Montreal. Cass, his wife, and his son were killed in an automobile accident in 1975.
