= St. George's Anglican Church (Fort Langley) =

Coordinates: 49°10′07″N 122°34′39″W

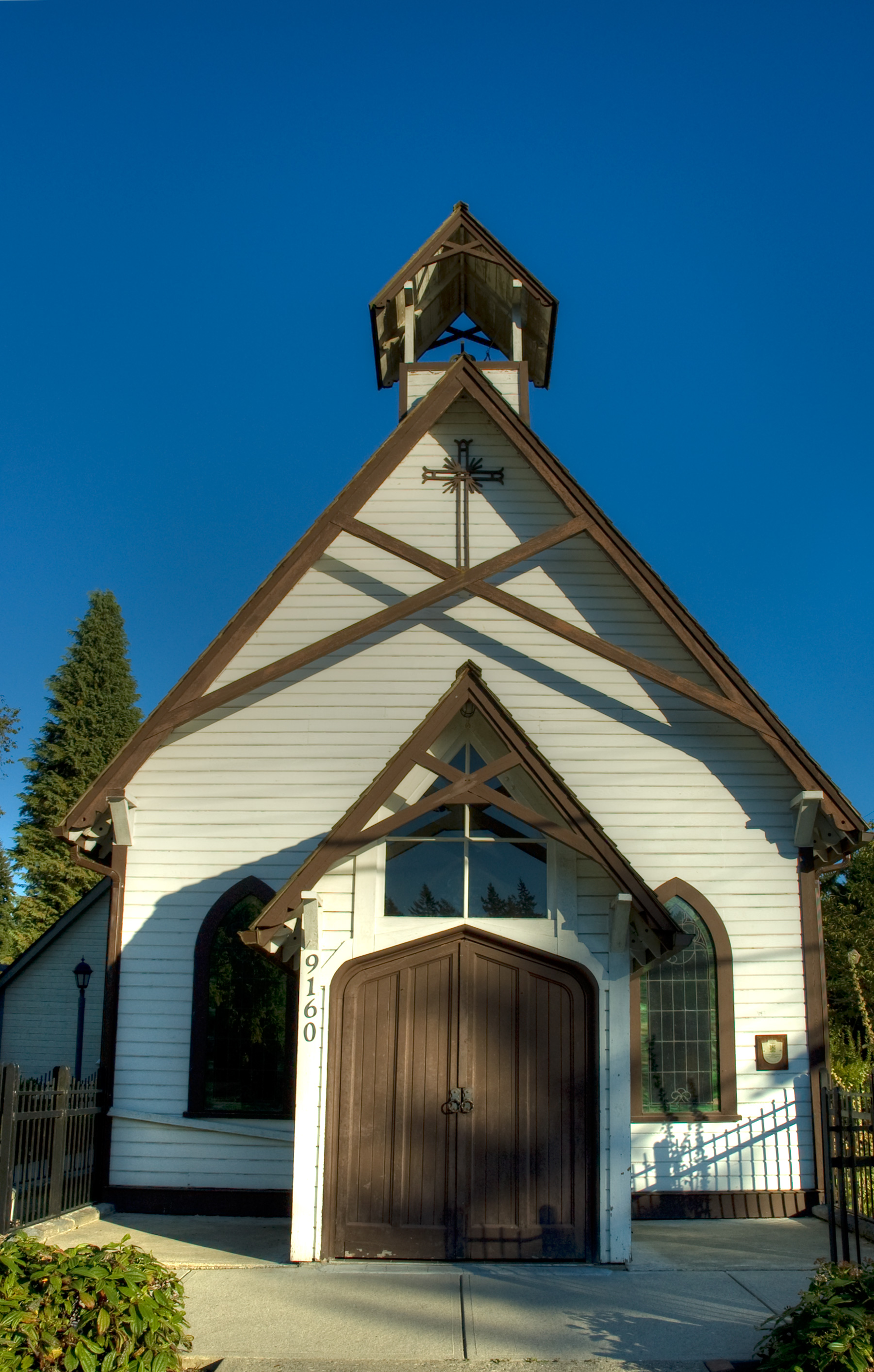
- St. George's Anglican Church in Fort Langley, British Columbia
- St. George's Anglican Church
- Location: 9160 Church Street, Fort Langley, British Columbia, Canada
- Country: Canada
- Denomination: Anglican Church of Canada
- Website: stgeorgeanglican.ca

History
- Status: Active
- Founded: 1859 (congregation)
- Consecrated: 1901

Architecture
- Heritage designation: Local Heritage Site (Langley Township)
- Architect: Duncan Bule (builder)
- Architectural type: Carpenter Gothic
- Completed: 1901

Specifications
- Materials: Wood

Administration
- Diocese: New Westminster

St. George’s Anglican Church is a historic church in Fort Langley, British Columbia, Canada. Built in 1901, it is a municipally recognized heritage site listed on the Canadian Register of Historic Places and remains an active place of worship.

== History ==
St. George’s Anglican congregation traces its origins to 1859 in Derby, before relocating to Fort Langley. The current church was constructed in 1901 on land sold by Alexander Mavis for $50. The small Carpenter Gothic-style structure, featuring a steep gabled roof and tall pointed windows, remains a significant landmark.

== Architecture ==
St. George’s Church exemplifies Carpenter Gothic architecture, characterized by:

- Steep gabled roof
- Pointed-arch windows
- Small bell tower (added in 1914)
- Gable screens and drilled rafter ends

The interior showcases herringbone-patterned tongue-and-groove fir paneling and retains original wooden pews and altar rails from 1909. The church houses nine memorial stained-glass windows, installed between 1912 and 2006.

== Notable features ==
- Kanaka Cross – An iron cross originally marking the graves of Hawaiian Hudson’s Bay Company workers, later mounted on the church.
- Stained-glass windows – A collection among the finest in the Fraser Valley.

== Heritage designation ==
St. George’s is a municipally designated heritage site and sits adjacent to the Hudson’s Bay Company historic cemetery, one of the oldest European burial sites in Langley Township.

== See also ==
- Fort Langley National Historic Site
