= Peretz Centre for Secular Jewish Culture =

Coordinates: 49°13′45.18″N 123°07′4.45″W

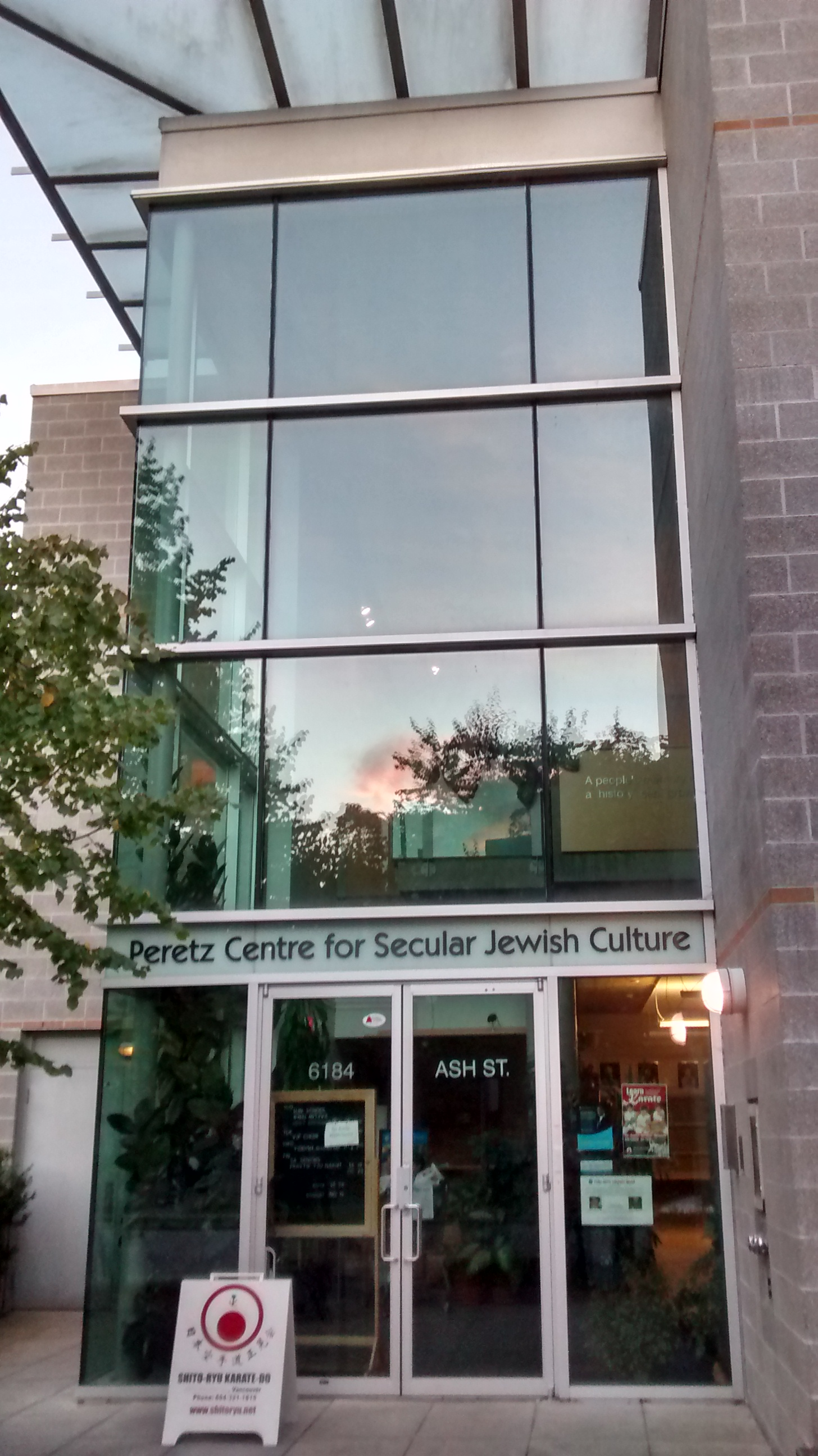
- Peretz Centre exterior
- Established: 1945; 81 years ago
- Type: Nonprofit, charitable, cultural institution
- Location: 6148 Ash Street Vancouver, British Columbia, Canada
- Region served: Metro Vancouver
- Website: https://www.peretz-centre.org
- Formerly called: Peretz Shule; Peretz Institute

The Peretz Centre for Secular Jewish Culture is a centre for secular Jewish culture and humanistic Judaism in Vancouver, British Columbia.

They provide education, community, and cultural programming with a particular focus on inclusion and a broad understanding of Jewish identity. This includes valuing the 2SLGBTQI+ community as well as welcoming interfaith and intercultural members.

With roots including the Jewish Bund, the Peretz remains committed to social justice and diversity.

== History ==
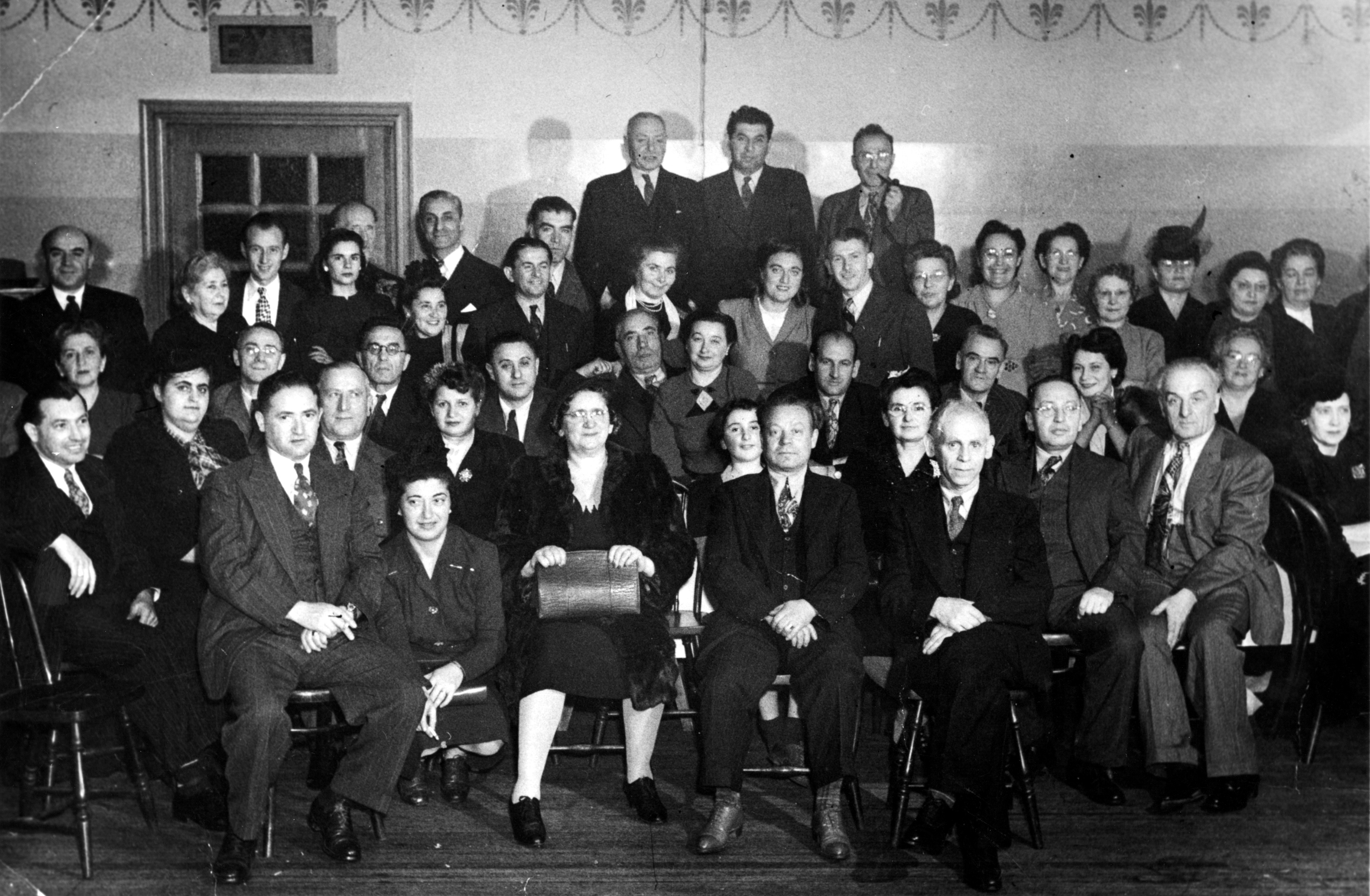
Gathering at Peretz School in 1945

The Vancouver Peretz Institute, also known as the Vancouver Peretz Shule, was incorporated in 1945 with the intention of opening that September in a converted house at 1190 West 15th Ave. Initially operating within the basement of the Jewish Community Centre, by 1947 they had purchased a building of their own on West Broadway between Alder St and Birch St. Its creation was motivated by a post-Holocaust, desire to expand Jewish education to members of the secular community with a particular focus on Yiddish and traditional culture. The Centre was named after Isaac Leib Peretz, due to his significance to Yiddish culture and for his progressive writings.

Beginning in 1952, the leftist views of the school led to conflict with the more conservative mainstream Jewish culture in Vancouver. The school was accused of communist affiliations with many believing that its secular model of teaching promoted anti-religiousness, which was thought to be an important component of communism. As a result, the school was denied the ability to participate in the communities United Jewish Appeal and therefore denied funding. They were also accused of being anti-Zionist, again due to individuals associating secularism with being anti-religion. In response to the increased scrutiny, the school sought to satisfy all sides. They would celebrate the birthday of the state of Israel, support peace movements that criticized Israeli policy, all while maintaining a strictly apolitical curriculum.

Construction began in 1961 on a new site for the school on Ash St between 45th Ave and 46th Ave. Costing $175,000 the one story building would include classrooms, an auditorium, and kitchen. The building opened the following year. At its peak in the 1959–1960 term, the school taught 118 children, but by 1971 its enrolment had dropped to below 50.

Through the subsequent decades, the Peretz struggled to maintain the finances to stay open and began to consider selling the property. In 2001, a new building was constructed on a section of the same land, and the name was changed to the "Peretz Centre for Secular Jewish Culture". The remaining property was sold to help finance the new building.

In 2021, the Vancouver Public Library Oakridge Branch temporarily moved into the first floor of the Peretz Centre for the duration of the Oakridge Mall redevelopment.

== Programs ==
Since 1990, the Peretz Centre has run a two-year bnei mitzvah program which is a secular coming-of-age ceremony for youth. This is done through learning about the importance of volunteering in your wider community, researching Jewish culture and understanding its issues, as well as developing an appreciation for Jewish knowledge and humour. The ceremony itself excludes the traditional religious practices and instead includes readings done on topics such as personal histories and cultural interpretations.

The Centre also hosts the Vancouver Jewish Folk Choir, which performs Jewish songs in Yiddish, Hebrew, Ladino, and English. The choir has been in its current form since 1979 but previous iterations existed as early as 1956.

In addition, the Peretz Centre has Yiddish classes, Sholem Aleichem Speakers Series (SASS), Exploring Jewish Writers (EJW), and regularly hosts secular humanist versions of Jewish holidays.

It is also home to the Jewish Museum & Archives of British Columbia and the Vancouver Jewish Film Festival.

== The Paulina and Shaya Kirman Library ==
The Peretz Centre houses the largest Yiddish language library in Western Canada, consisting of nearly 4000 volumes of books and journals. The library grew out of the existing collection of the Peretz School and expanded through donations of material from community members as well as institutions such as the University of British Columbia. They also received the collections of the Calgary Peretz school upon its closure and material from the United Jewish People's Order Toronto Branch. The library is a member of the Yiddish Book Center and has been a member of YIVO. In 2001, following the construction of the new Peretz Centre, the library was given its own designated space on the main floor and renamed for its founding librarians Paulina and Shaya Kirman.
