= Babaji Singh =

Mexican translator

Babaji Singh Khalsa
- (Punjabi: ਬਾਬਾਜੀ ਸਿੰਘ ਖਾਲਸਾ)
- Born: August 15, 1947; Mexico City, Mexico
- Died: November 19, 2006 (aged 59); Mexico
- Occupations: Sikh preacher, Spanish translator of Guru Granth Sahib
- Spouse: Guru Amrit Kaur

Babaji Singh Khalsa (Punjabi: ਬਾਬਾਜੀ ਸਿੰਘ ਖਾਲਸਾ) (August 15, 1947 – November 19, 2006) was a Mexican Sikh who is credited for translating Guru Granth Sahib, the holy text of the Sikhs into Spanish.

== Life ==
He was born in Mexico City; raised in a Catholic family, he finished his studies in a Jesuit University in Mexico, Universidad Iberoamericana. After finishing college, he left for Alaska and then United States of America. Soon, after converting to Sikhism, he returned to Mexico City, Mexico and became a Sikh preacher.

He translated the Guru Granth Sahib into Spanish, which took him 30 years, with help from the English translation of the scripture by Gopal Singh. The translation was presented by his widow, Guru Amrit Kaur in October 2008, in Nanded, during the Tercentenary Celebrations of the Guru Gaddi of Guru Granth Sahib.

== See also ==
- Sikhism
- Guru Granth Sahib
- Yogi Bhajan
- Spanish language
