= Congregation Schara Tzedeck =

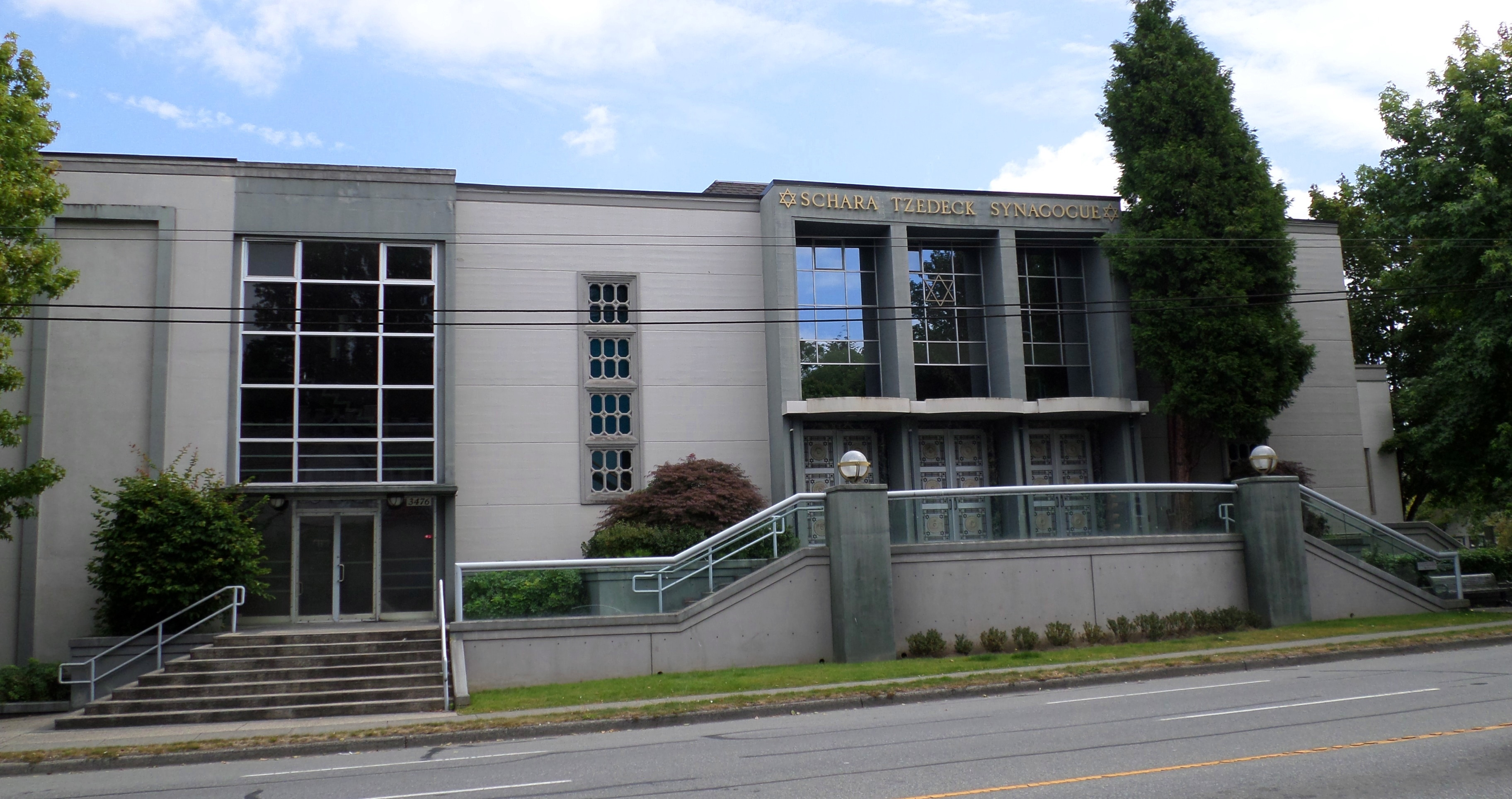
- Schara Tzedeck synagogue, 2016

- Location in Greater Vancouver

Religion
- Affiliation: Modern Orthodox Judaism
- Rite: Ashkenazi
- Ecclesiastical or organisational status: Synagogue
- Leadership: Rabbi Andrew Rosenblatt
- Status: Active

Location
- Location: 3476 Oak Street, Vancouver, British Columbia V6H 2L8
- Administration: Union of Orthodox Jewish Congregations of America
- Coordinates: 49.2548097°N 123.1270814°W

Architecture
- Established: 1907
- Completed: January 25, 1948

Website
- www.scharatzedeck.com

Congregation Schara Tzedeck is a Modern Orthodox synagogue located in Vancouver, British Columbia, Canada. The synagogue is the oldest synagogue and the largest Orthodox synagogue in Greater Vancouver. From Hebrew, the transliteration of the synagogue's name is the "Gates of Righteousness".

== Overview ==
Founded in 1907, it was originally known as "Benei Yehuda" and was located at East Pender Street at Heatley Street in the Strathcona neighbourhood, then the focus of the city's Jewish community. Francis George Gardiner, architect's drawings of the Schara Tzedeck synagogue, c. 1920 are at Vancouver City Archives.

Its present rabbi is Rabbi Andrew Rosenblatt. The congregation has a diverse membership, with many multi-generational families and long-time members. It is located at 3476 Oak Street, Vancouver, BC. Notable members included David Oppenheimer, entrepreneur and second Mayor of Vancouver, who donated the land for the original site.

The synagogue holds daily prayer services, and has numerous educational and social programs for children and youth, men, women, families, and seniors. Examples include weekly adult education classes, youth events, Bar/Bat Mitzvah classes, guest lectures, Shabbat dinners, and holiday programming. A mikveh is located on-site. The Vancouver chapter of NCSY operates out of the synagogue. Congregation Schara Tzedeck is affiliated with the Union of Orthodox Jewish Congregations of America.

== History ==
The congregation was founded in 1907 as "Benei Yehuda", which can be translated as Children (Sons) of Judah. The first synagogue building was erected at Pender Street and Heatley Avenue in 1911. The congregation was legally incorporated on June 14, 1917 under a newly chosen name, "Schara Tzedeck", which means Gates of Righteousness. A new larger building was completed in September 1947, located in the South Cambie neighbourhood adjacent to the Shaughnessy neighbourhood. The new synagogue was officially opened on January 25, 1948. In 1963, an expansion was constructed on property to the immediate north to accommodate offices, classrooms, a large auditorium, and other facilities. Past rabbis include Rabbi Bernard Goldenberg, Rabbi Marvin Heir, Rabbi Mordechai Eliahu Feuerstein, and Rabbi Avi Baumol. The Institute for Stained Glass in Canada has documented the stained glass at Schara Tzedeck Synagogue.

== Present ==
The synagogue has seen growth in membership over the last several years. Its youth program, including NCSY chapter, was reinvigorated in 2001 due to the efforts of Rabbi Avi Berman and has continued to see strong attendance and growth. In 2007, to commemorate the synagogue's centennial, a Century Campaign raised funds for a youth programming fund and renovations of the lower level. The campaign culminated in the Century Celebration gala event held in the spring of 2007. The renovation was completed in the fall of 2011. The new facilities include modern state-of-the-art kitchens, a completely renovated social hall dedicated as the Silber Auditorium, an expansion of the Wosk Auditorium, and renovation of the Beit Midrash. The Beit Midrash was rededicated as the Jack and Sadie Diamond Z"L Beit Midrash and the Yosef Wosk Library.

== See also ==
- Oldest synagogues in Canada
- History of the Jews in Canada
- Jews and Judaism in Vancouver
- List of places of worship in Greater Vancouver
