= Demographics of Metro Vancouver =

The demographics of Metro Vancouver indicate a multicultural and multiracial region. Metro Vancouver is a metropolitan area, with its major urban centre being Vancouver, British Columbia, Canada. The Vancouver census metropolitan area, as defined by Statistics Canada, encompasses roughly the same territory as the Metro Vancouver Regional District, a regional district in British Columbia. The regional district includes 23 local authorities. Figures provided here are for the Vancouver census metropolitan area and not for the City of Vancouver.

== Population growth ==
The following table shows the development of the number of inhabitants according to census data of Statistics Canada. The former municipalities of Point Grey and South Vancouver are not included in the data prior to 1931. (Note: Vancouver did not exist as such at the time of the 1871 and 1881 censuses.)

Vancouver
Year	Pop.	±%
1891	13,709	—
1901	26,133	+90.6%
1911	100,401	+284.2%
1921	117,217	+16.7%
1931	246,593	+110.4%
1941	275,353	+11.7%
1951	344,833	+25.2%
1956	365,844	+6.1%
1961	384,522	+5.1%
1966	410,375	+6.7%
1971	426,256	+3.9%
1976	410,188	−3.8%
1981	414,281	+1.0%
1986	431,147	+4.1%
1991	471,644	+9.4%
1996	514,008	+9.0%
2001	545,671	+6.2%
2006	578,041	+5.9%
2011	603,502	+4.4%
2016	631,486	+4.6%
2021	662,248	+4.9%

Metro Vancouver
Year	Pop.	±%
1891	21,887	—
1901	42,926	+96.1%
1911	164,020	+282.1%
1921	232,597	+41.8%
1931	347,709	+49.5%
1941	393,898	+13.3%
1951	561,960	+42.7%
1956	665,017	+18.3%
1961	790,165	+18.8%
1966	892,286	+12.9%
1971	1,082,352	+21.3%
1976	1,166,348	+7.8%
1981	1,169,831	+0.3%
1986	1,542,745	+31.9%
1991	1,602,590	+3.9%
1996	1,831,665	+14.3%
2001	1,986,965	+8.5%
2006	2,116,581	+6.5%
2011	2,313,328	+9.3%
2016	2,463,431	+6.5%
2021	2,642,825	+7.3%

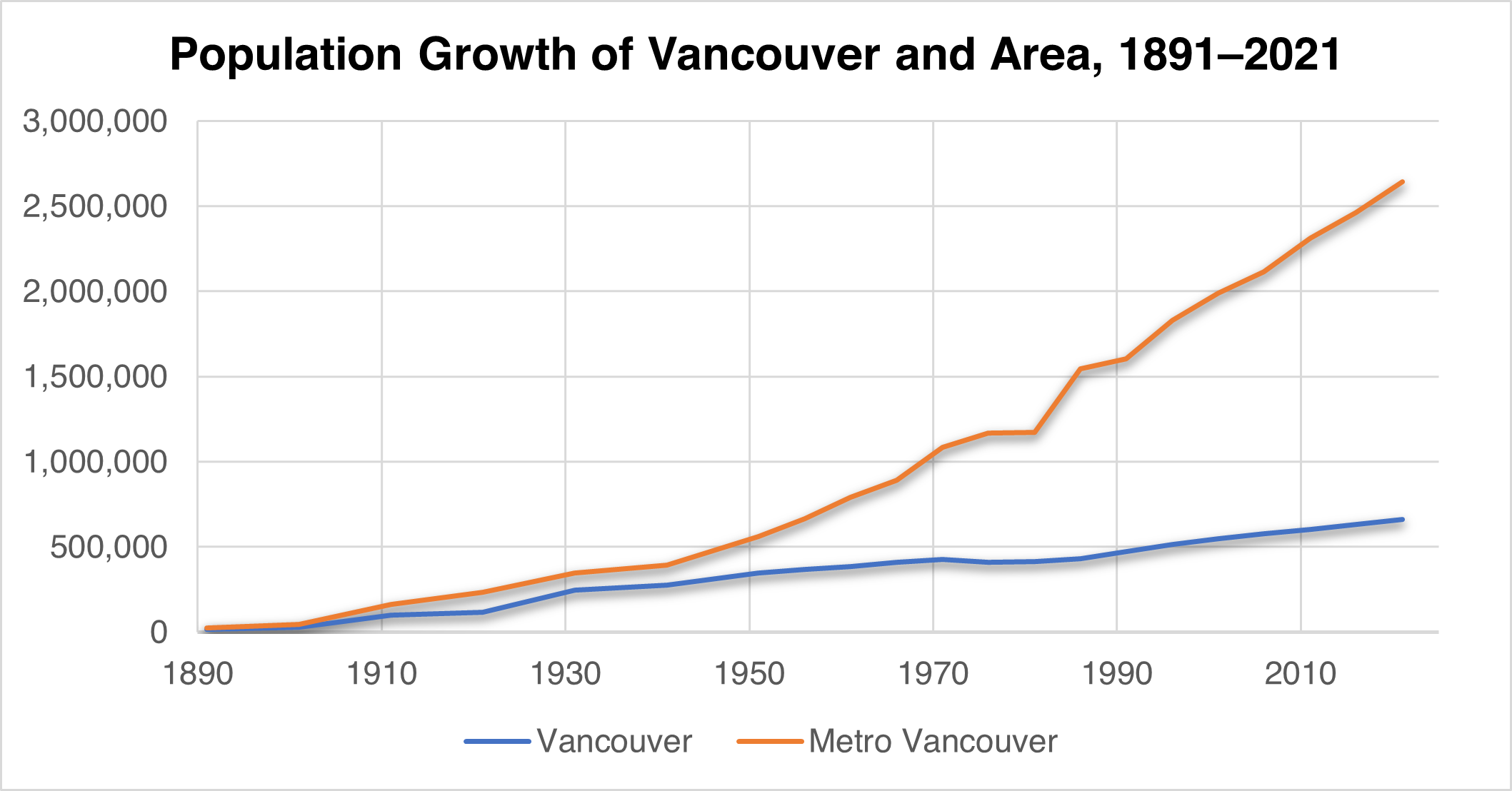
Population growth

== Population by municipality ==
The Metro Vancouver Regional District comprises 23 member authorities — 21 municipalities, one electoral area, and one treaty First Nation.

Metro Vancouver member populations
Member	Census subdivision	Population (2021)	Population (2016)	% change (2016–2021)	2021 provincial rank
Anmore	Village	2,356	2,210	+6.6%	185th
Belcarra	Village	687	643	+6.8%	301st
Bowen Island	Island municipality	4,256	3,680	+15.7%	118th
Burnaby	City	249,125	232,755	+7.0%	3rd
Coquitlam	City	148,625	139,284	+6.7%	6th
Delta	City	108,455	102,238	+6.1%	10th
City of Langley	City	28,963	25,888	+11.9%	30th
Township of Langley	District municipality	132,603	117,285	+13.1%	8th
Lions Bay	Village	1,390	1,334	+4.2%	251st
Maple Ridge	City	90,990	82,256	+10.6%	15th
Metro Vancouver A	Regional district electoral area	18,612	16,133	+15.4%	39th
New Westminster	City	78,916	70,996	+11.2%	17th
City of North Vancouver	City	58,120	52,898	+9.9%	20th
District of North Vancouver	District municipality	88,168	85,649	+2.9%	16th
Pitt Meadows	City	19,146	18,573	+3.1%	37th
Port Coquitlam	City	61,498	58,612	+4.9%	19th
Port Moody	City	33,535	33,551	±0.0%	28th
Richmond	City	209,937	198,309	+5.9%	4th
Surrey	City	568,322	517,887	+9.7%	2nd
Tsawwassen	First Nation	2,256	816	+176.5%	191st
Vancouver	City	662,248	631,486	+4.9%	1st
West Vancouver	District municipality	44,122	42,473	+3.9%	23rd
White Rock	City	21,939	19,952	+10.0%	33rd
Metro Vancouver		2,642,825	2,463,431	+7.3%	–
Source: Statistics Canada; Metro Vancouver Regional District

== Ethnic diversity ==
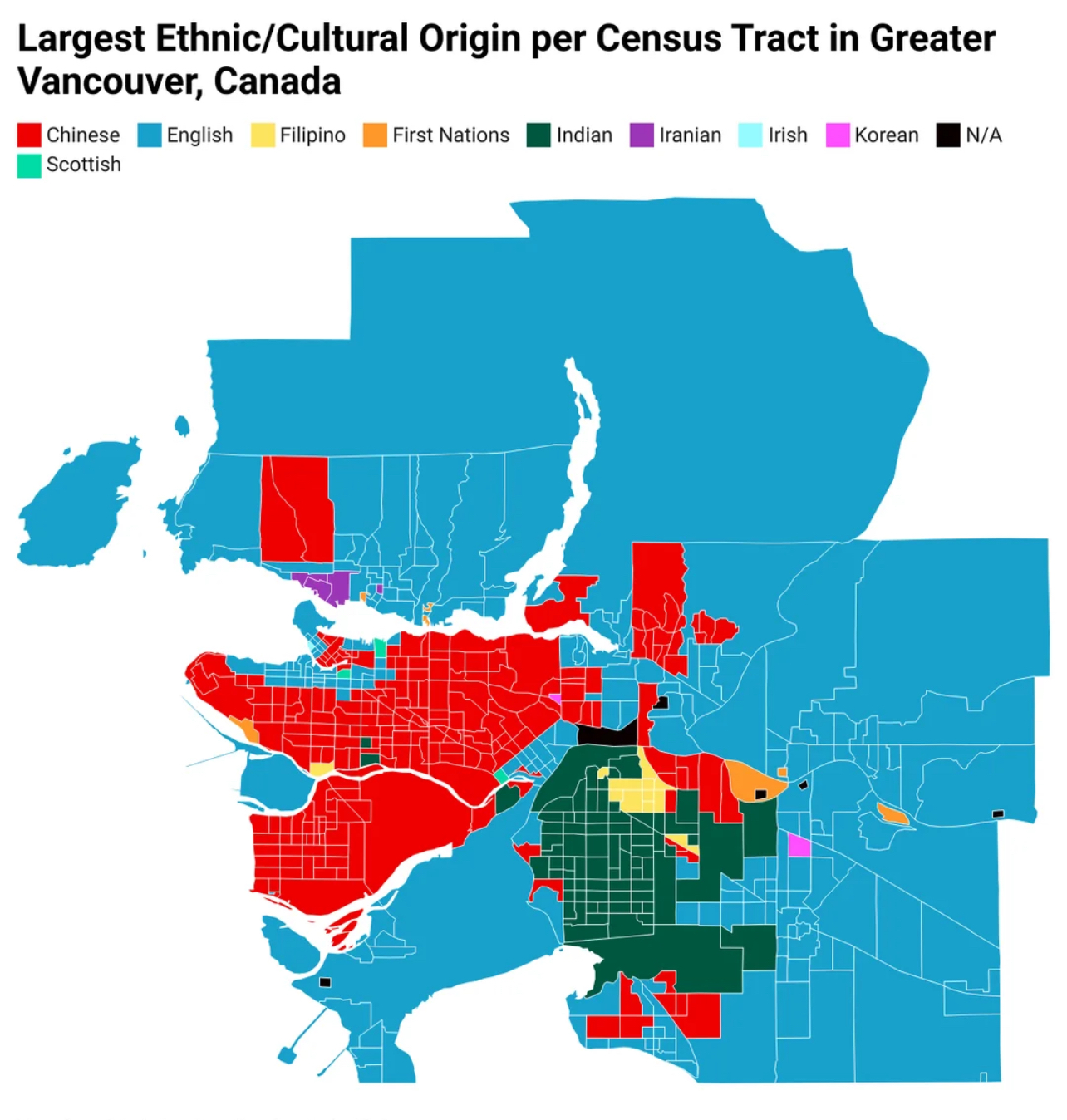
Largest reported ethnic origins in Metro Vancouver (2021 census)

Largest panethnic groups in Metro Vancouver by census tract based on the 2021 census

Largest panethnic groups in Metro Vancouver by census tract based on the 2011 census

Largest panethnic groups in Metro Vancouver by census tract based on the 2001 census

Largest non-European panethnic groups in Metro Vancouver by census tract based on the 2021 census

The demographics of Metro Vancouver reveal a multi-ethnic society. There remains a small population, less than 2%, of Aboriginal peoples, who according to archeological and historical records, have inhabited this region for more than 3,000 years.

From the time of the region's first non-indigenous settlement in the second half of the 19th century, people from Britain and Ireland were the largest group of immigrants and, collectively, remain the largest ethnic grouping in Vancouver to this day. The largest non British or Irish ethnic groups situated in Vancouver include Chinese, Indians and Germans.

The metropolitan area has one of the most diverse Chinese-speaking communities with several varieties of Chinese being represented. Metro Vancouver contains the second-largest Chinatown in North America (after San Francisco's), and many multicultural neighbourhoods such as the Punjabi Market, Greektown, and Japantown. Commercial Drive, the core of the historic Little Italy, which is also the main Portuguese area, has become an alternative-culture focus, though traditional Italian and Portuguese and other establishments and residents remain in the area. Bilingual street signs can be seen in Chinatown and the Punjabi Market, and commercial signs in a wide array of languages can be seen all over the metropolitan area.

=== Metro Vancouver ===
Ethnic origin	Population (2016)	Percent of 2016 population (2,426,235)	Population (2006)	Percent of 2006 population (2,097,960)
Cornish	245	0%	225	0.02%
English	470,340	19.4%	500,340	24.09%
Irish	275,355	11.3%	251,695	12.00%
Manx	770	0%	640	0.03%
Scottish	341,075	14.1%	337,230	16.07%
Welsh	44,935	1.9%	41,805	1.99%
British n.i.e.	55,695	2.3%	35,505	1.69%
Acadians	1,520	0.1%	1,280	0.06%
French	147,835	6.1%	137,270	6.54%
Inuit	600	0%	580	0.03%
Métis	24,505	1%	17,110	0.82%
North American Indian	52,305	2.2%	43,190	2.06%
American	32,115	1.3%	27,000	1.29%
Canadian	331,205	13.7%	278,350	13.27%
Newfoundlander	660	0%	390	0.02%
Nova Scotian	75	0%	120	0.01%
Ontarian	35	0%	20	less than 0.01%
Québécois	750	0%	350	0.02%
Other North American provincial or regional groups	170	0%	150	0.01%
Antiguan	130	0%	105	0.01%
Bahamian	160	0%	50	less than 0.01%
Barbadian	1,310	0.1%	925	0.04%
Bermudan	155	0%	100	less than 0.01%
Carib	60	0%	85	less than 0.01%
Cuban	870	0%	640	0.03%
Dominican n.o.s.	535	0%	295	0.01%
Grenadian	280	0%	175	0.01%
Guyanese	1,240	0.1%	825	0.04%
Haitian	635	0%	405	0.02%
Jamaican	6,455	0.3%	4,645	0.22%
Kittitian/Nevisian	95	0%	15	less than 0.01%
Martinican	20	0%	40	less than 0.01%
Montserratian	15	0%	20	less than 0.01%
Puerto Rican	280	0%	260	0.01%
St. Lucian	115	0%	80	less than 0.01%
Trinidadian/Tobagonian	3,120	0.1%	2,185	0.10%
Vincentian/Grenadinian	325	0%	120	0.01%
West Indian	1,440	0.1%	1,245	0.06%
Caribbean n.i.e.	1,485	0.1%	620	0.03%
Aboriginal from Central/South America	1,790	0.1%	830	0.04%
Argentines	1,360	0.1%	790	0.04%
Belizean	35	0%	160	less than 0.01%
Bolivian	185	0%	190	less than 0.01%
Brazilian	4,065	0.2%	1,115	0.05%
Chilean	3,840	0.2%	2,935	0.14%
Colombian	4,600	0.2%	2,125	0.10%
Costa Rican	460	0%	355	0.02%
Ecuadorian	740	0%	225	0.01%
Guatemalan	1,985	0.1%	1,405	0.07%
Hispanic	1,200	0%	555	0.03%
Honduran	1,120	0%	745	0.04%
Maya	620	0%	575	0.03%
Mexican	15,115	0.6%	7,680	0.37%
Nicaragua	1,060	0%	860	0.04%
Panamanian	195	0%	145	0.01%
Paraguayan	285	0%	170	0.01%
Peruvian	3,100	0.1%	1,910	0.09%
Salvadoran	5,310	0.2%	5,760	0.27%
Uruguayan	285	0%	60	less than 0.01%
Venezuelan	1,555	0.1%	535	0.03%
Latin, Central or South American n.i.e.	2,450	0.1%	1,225	0.06%
Austrian	21,260	0.9%	21,500	1.02%
Belgian	8,205	0.3%	6,555	0.31%
Dutch (Netherlands)	77,635	3.2%	71,710	3.42%
Flemish	955	0%	815	0.04%
Frisian	195	0%	155	0.01%
German	222,025	9.2%	203,715	9.71%
Luxembourger	330	0%	235	0.01%
Swiss	11,340	0.5%	10,130	0.48%
Finnish	14,085	0.6%	12,745	0.61%
Danish	23,025	0.9%	22,800	1.09%
Icelandic	11,055	0.5%	9,630	0.46%
Norwegian	49,335	2%	46,260	2.20%
Swedish	40,690	1.7%	39,920	1.90%
Northern European n.i.e.	5,320	0.2%	3,830	0.18%
Estonian	2,540	0.1%	2,590	0.12%
Latvian	2,455	0.1%	2,160	0.10%
Lithuanian	4,155	0.2%	3,100	0.15%
Belarusian	1,825	0.1%	820	0.04%
Czech	11,710	0.5%	10,385	0.50%
Czechoslovak	2,560	0.1%	2,810	0.13%
Slovak	6,345	0.3%	5,700	0.27%
Hungarian (Magyar)	25,860	1.1%	23,365	1.11%
Polish	70,590	2.9%	60,715	2.89%
Romanian	17,490	0.7%	14,055	0.67%
Russian	58,535	2.4%	47,935	2.28%
Ukrainian	94,400	3.9%	81,725	3.90%
Albanian	1,330	0.1%	650	0.03%
Bosnian	2,675	0.1%	2,535	0.12%
Bulgaria	2,940	0.1%	1,960	0.09%
Croatian	15,670	0.6%	12,475	0.59%
Cypriot	345	0%	270	0.01%
Greek	16,085	0.7%	15,025	0.72%
Italian	87,875	3.6%	76,345	3.64%
Kosovar	170	0%	85	less than 0.01%
Macedonian	865	0%	600	0.03%
Maltese	1,185	0%	990	0.05%
Montenegrin	600	0%	370	0.02%
Portuguese	24,575	1%	20,335	0.97%
Serbian	10,160	0.4%	7,690	0.37%
Sicilian	210	0%	180	0.01%
Slovenian	3,050	0.1%	2,475	0.12%
Spanish	43,990	1.8%	36,000	1.72%
Yugoslavs	3,275	0.1%	5,525	0.26%
Basque	475	0%	405	0.02%
Gypsy (Roma)	325	0%	250	0.01%
Jewish	11,230	0.5%	21,465	1.02%
misc. Slav (European)	505	0%	760	0.04%
Other European n.i.e.	6,470	0.3%	3,975	0.19%
Afrikaner	365	0%	290	0.01%
Akan	30	0%	25	less than 0.01%
Amhara	115	0%	65	less than 0.01%
Angolan	55	0%	70	less than 0.01%
Ashanti	65	0%	65	less than 0.01%
Bantu	235	0%	170	0.01%
Black	1,460	0.1%	3,005	0.14%
Burundian	195	0%	90	less than 0.01%
Congolese (Zairian) people	675	0%	75	less than 0.01%
Congolese n.o.s.	400	0%	85	less than 0.01%
Dinka	15	0%	25	less than 0.01%
East African people	1,390	0.1%	610	0.03%
Eritrean	950	0%	335	0.02%
Ethiopian	2,020	0.1%	1,625	0.08%
Gabonese	10	0%	10	less than 0.01%
Gambian	20	0%	15	less than 0.01%
Ghanaian	1,270	0.1%	1,100	less than 0.01%
Guinean n.o.s.	125	0%	95	less than 0.01%
Ibo	200	0%	15	less than 0.01%
Ivoirian	45	0%	15	less than 0.01%
Kenyan	1,170	0%	765	0.04%
Malagasay	80	0%	35	less than 0.01%
Mauritian	760	0%	325	0.02%
Nigerian	1,680	0.1%	880	0.04%
Oromo	120	0%	145	0.01%
Rwandan	305	0%	225	0.01%
Senegalese	45	0%	20	less than 0.01%
Seychellois	15	0%	20	less than 0.01%
Sierra Leonean	90	0%	115	0.01%
Somali	2,105	0.1%	1,320	0.06%
South African	6,485	0.3%	4,120	0.20%
Sudanese	940	0%	705	less than 0.01%
Tanzanian	425	0%	135	0.01%
Tigrian	180	0%	50	less than 0.01%
Togolese	80	0%	15	less than 0.01%
Ugandan	595	0%	360	0.02%
Yoruba	130	0%	80	less than 0.01%
Zambian	120	0%	40	less than 0.01%
Zimbabwean	565	0%	230	0.01%
Zulu	65	0%	70	less than 0.01%
African n.i.e.	10,325	0.4%	6,490	0.31%
Egyptian	3,405	0.1%	2,120	0.10%
Iraqi	5,205	0.2%	1,805	0.09%
Jordanian	585	0%	300	0.01%
Kuwaiti	100	0%	75	less than 0.01%
Lebanese	5,320	0.2%	6,175	0.29%
Libyan	210	0%	25	less than 0.01%
Algerian	615	0%	390	0.02%
Berber	185	0%	150	0.01%
Moroccan	1,480	0.1%	635	0.03%
Tunisian	380	0%	70	less than 0.01%
Maghrebi origins n.i.e.	170	0%	160	0.01%
Palestinian	2,245	0.1%	1,050	0.05%
Saudi Arabian	550	0%	255	0.01%
Syrian	2,780	0.1%	925	0.04%
Yemeni	255	0%	75	less than 0.01%
Arab n.i.e.	4,655	0.2%	3,075	0.15%
Afghan	7,500	0.3%	4,620	0.22%
Armenian	2,845	0.1%	2,700	0.15%
Assyrian	450	0%	355	0.02%
Azeribaijani	890	0%	405	0.02%
Georgian	550	0%	240	0.01%
Iranian	44,355	1.8%	27,155	1.29%
Israeli	2,075	0.1%	765	0.04%
Kurd	1,980	0.1%	1,145	0.05%
Pashtun	325	0%	170	0.01%
Tatar	650	0%	235	0.01%
Turk	5,185	0.2%	3,380	0.16%
West Asian n.i.e.	2,135	0.1%	1,350	0.06%
Bangladeshi	1,510	0.1%	785	0.04%
Bengali	755	0%	415	0.02%
Indian	243,135	10%	181,895	8.67%
Goan	320	0%	280	0.01%
Gujarati	615	0%	515	0.02%
Kashmiri	145	0%	70	less than 0.01%
Nepali	1,155	0%	460	0.02%
Pakistani	10,825	0.4%	6,875	0.33%
Punjabi	30,670	1.3%	13,735	0.65%
Sinhalese	530	0%	415	0.02%
Sri Lankan	5,065	0.2%	3,740	0.18%
Tamil	1,060	0%	740	0.04%
South Asian n.i.e.	7,200	0.3%	6,495	0.31%
Burmese	1,970	0.1%	865	0.04%
Cambodian	2,510	0.1%	1,525	0.07%
Chinese	499,175	20.6%	402,000	19.16%
Filipino	133,925	5.5%	83,760	3.99%
Hmong	115	0%	75	less than 0.01%
Indonesian	4,935	0.2%	3,140	0.15%
Japanese	37,630	1.6%	30,230	1.44%
Khmer	0	0%	135	0.01%
Korean	55,505	2.3%	46,040	2.19%
Laotian	1,775	0.1%	1,065	0.05%
Malaysian	4,230	0.2%	3,365	0.16%
Mongolian	1,000	0%	680	0.03%
Singaporean	895	0%	515	0.02%
Taiwanese	20,345	0.8%	9,810	0.47%
Thai	3,330	0.1%	1,565	0.07%
Tibetan	445	0%	100	Less than 0.01%
Vietnamese	34,915	1.4%	26,115	1.24%
East or Southeast Asian n.i.e.	630	0%	1,170	0.06%
Asian n.o.s.	1,805	0.1%	80	less than 0.01%
Australian	8,360	0.3%	5,525	0.26%
New Zealander	3,340	0.1%	2,390	0.11%
Fijian	13,085	0.5%	8,920	0.43%
Hawaiian	865	0%	660	0.03%
Māori	565	0%	375	0.02%
Polynesia	345	0%	265	0.01%
Samoan	245	0%	160	0.01%
Pacific Islander n.i.e.	680	210	0.01%	–
Note: Percentages total more than 100% due to multiple responses, e.g. German–East Indian, Norwegian–Irish–Polish

Panethnic groups in Metro Vancouver (1981–2021)
Panethnic group	2021		2016		2011		2006		2001		1996		1981	
Panethnic group	Pop.	%	Pop.	%	Pop.	%	Pop.	%	Pop.	%	Pop.	%	Pop.	%
European (Note: 2001–2016: Statistic includes all persons that did not make up part of a visible minority or an indigenous identity.) (Note: 2021: Statistic includes all persons belonging to the non-Indigenous and non-visible minority "White" population group.)	1,124,475	43.13%	1,179,100	48.6%	1,197,985	52.53%	1,182,355	56.36%	1,204,970	61.24%	1,218,195	67.16%	1,066,460	85.28%
East Asian (Note: Statistic includes total responses of "Chinese", "Korean", and "Japanese" under visible minority section on census.)	606,920	23.28%	557,745	22.99%	488,240	21.41%	451,790	21.53%	395,540	20.1%	318,005	17.53%	98,895	7.91%
South Asian	369,295	14.17%	291,005	11.99%	252,405	11.07%	207,165	9.87%	164,365	8.35%	120,140	6.62%	34,820	2.78%
Southeast Asian (Note: Statistic includes total responses of "Filipino" and "Southeast Asian" under visible minority section on census.)	198,940	7.63%	168,075	6.93%	156,315	6.85%	112,365	5.36%	85,485	4.34%	61,085	3.37%	17,270	1.38%
Middle Eastern (Note: Statistic includes total responses of "West Asian" and "Arab" under visible minority section on census.)	87,090	3.34%	62,440	2.57%	48,870	2.14%	35,590	1.7%	27,340	1.39%	18,155	1%	4,525	0.36%
Indigenous	63,345	2.43%	61,455	2.53%	52,375	2.3%	40,310	1.92%	36,855	1.87%	31,140	1.72%	10,850	0.87%
Latin American	51,500	1.98%	34,805	1.43%	29,125	1.28%	22,695	1.08%	18,715	0.95%	13,830	0.76%	3,025	0.24%
African	41,180	1.58%	29,830	1.23%	23,545	1.03%	20,670	0.99%	18,405	0.94%	16,400	0.9%	2,570	0.21%
Other/multiracial (Note: Statistic includes total responses of "Visible minority, n.i.e." and "Multiple visible minorities" under visible minority section on census.)	65,350	2.51%	41,780	1.72%	31,835	1.4%	25,035	1.19%	15,810	0.8%	16,990	0.94%	12,195	0.98%
Total visible minority	1,420,275	54.48%	1,185,680	48.87%	1,030,335	45.18%	875,310	41.72%	725,660	36.88%	564,600	31.13%	173,300	13.86%
Total responses	2,607,015	98.65%	2,426,235	98.49%	2,280,695	98.59%	2,097,965	99.12%	1,967,480	99.02%	1,813,935	99.03%	1,250,610	98.61%
Total population	2,642,825	100%	2,463,431	100%	2,313,328	100%	2,116,581	100%	1,986,965	100%	1,831,665	100%	1,268,183	100%
Note: Totals greater than 100% due to multiple origin responses

==== Visible minorities ====
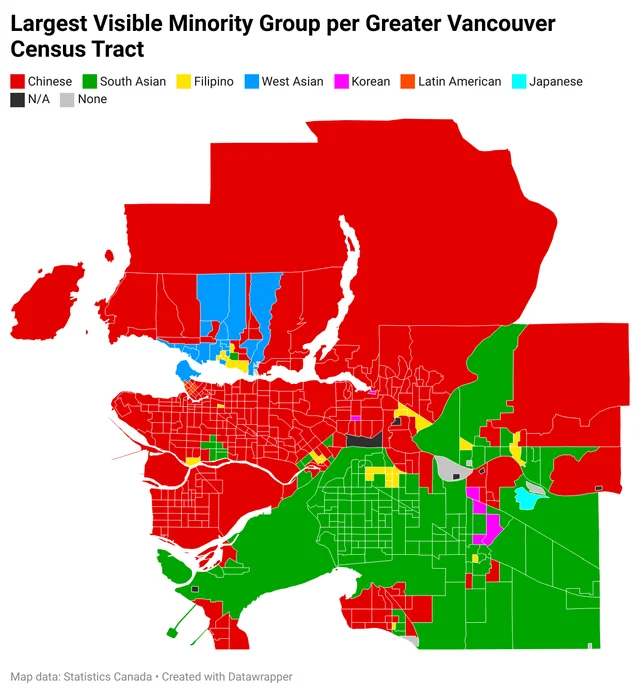
Largest visible minority groups in Metro Vancouver by census tract (2021 census)

In the city of Vancouver and four adjacent municipalities (Surrey, Burnaby, Richmond, and Coquitlam), there is no visible majority. Hence, the term visible minority is used here in contrast to the overall Canadian population which remains predominantly of European descent. In Metro Vancouver, at the 2021 census, 54.5% of the population were members of non-European ethnic groups, 43.1% were members of European ethnic groups, and 2.4% of the population identified as Indigenous.

Greater Vancouver has more interracial couples than Canada's two largest cities, Toronto and Montreal. In 2011, 9.6% of married and common-law couples in Greater Vancouver are interracial; double the Canadian average of 4.6%, and higher than in the Toronto CMA (8.2%) and the Greater Montreal (5.2%). Vancouver has less residential segregation of its ethnic minorities compared to Canadian cities like Montreal. However, residential segregation in Greater Vancouver continues to persist in certain parts of the metropolitan area.

Population statistics for visible minorities in Greater Vancouver
Population group		2021		1981	
Population group		Pop.	%	Pop.	%
Total European population		1,124,475	43.1%	1,066,460	85.3%
Total Indigenous population		63,345	2.4%	10,850	0.9%
Visible minority group	Chinese	512,260	19.6%	83,845	6.7%
Visible minority group	South Asian	369,295	14.2%	34,820	2.8%
Visible minority group	Filipino	142,125	5.5%	12,830	1%
Visible minority group	Korean	63,465	2.4%	3,335	0.3%
Visible minority group	West Asian	64,645	2.5%	2,220	0.2%
Visible minority group	Southeast Asian	56,815	2.2%	4,440	0.4%
Visible minority group	Latin American	51,500	2%	3,025	0.2%
Visible minority group	Japanese	31,195	1.2%	11,715	0.9%
Visible minority group	Black	41,180	1.6%	2,570	0.2%
Visible minority group	Arab	22,445	0.9%	2,305	0.2%
Visible minority group	Visible minority, n.i.e.	14,745	0.6%	N/A	N/A
Visible minority group	Multiple visible minorities	50,605	1.9%	N/A	N/A
Total visible minority population		1,420,275	54.5%	173,300	13.9%
Total responses		2,607,015	98.6%	1,250,610	98.6%
Total population		2,642,825	100%	1,268,183	100%
Note: Totals greater than 100% due to multiple origin responses.

=== Municipalities ===
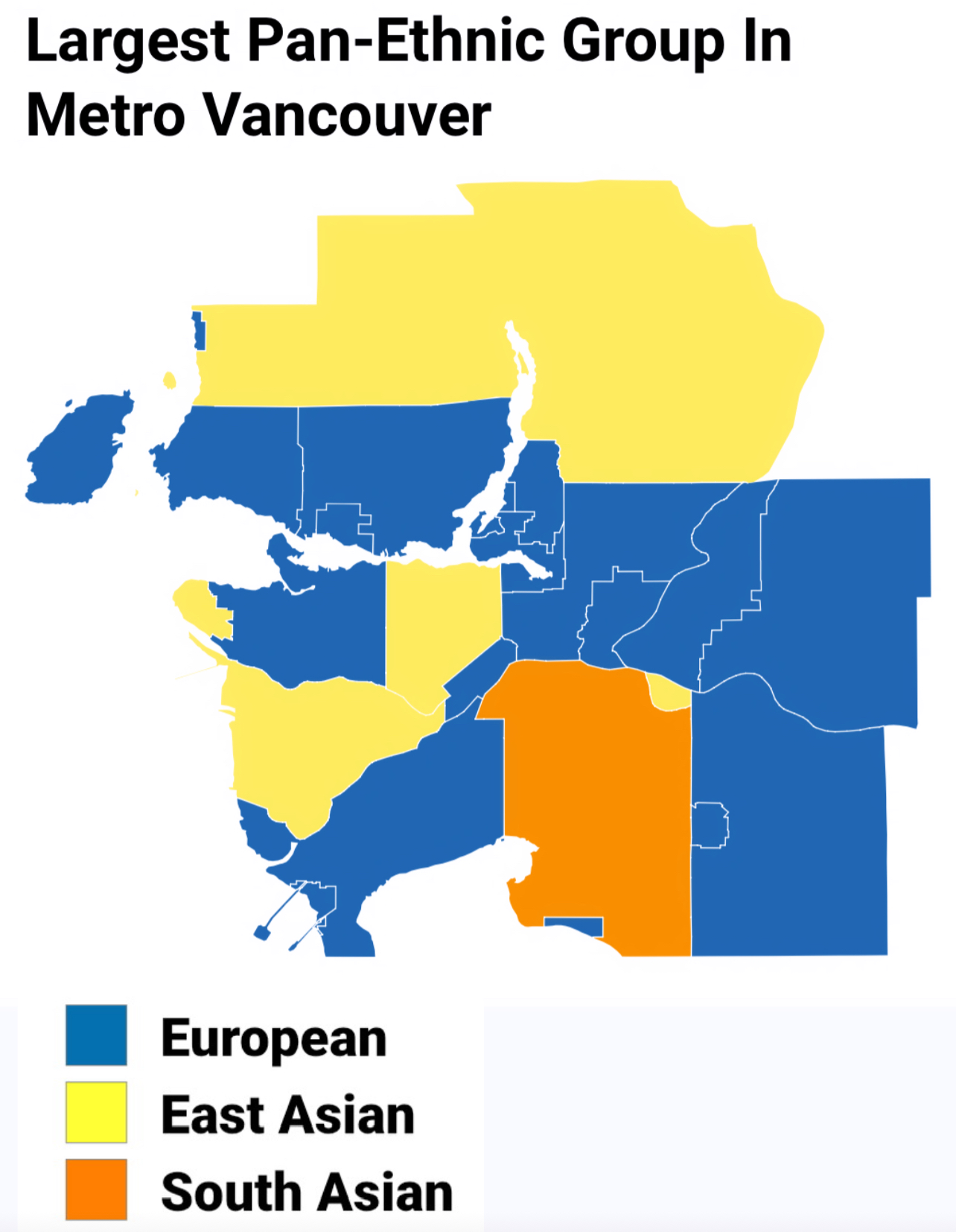
Largest pan-ethnic group in Metro Vancouver by municipality (2021 census)

Panethnic origins by Metro Vancouver municipalities (2021 census)
Municipality	Total population	European (Note: Statistic includes all persons that did not make up part of a visible minority or an indigenous identity.)	East Asian	South Asian	Southeast Asian	Middle Eastern	Indigenous	Latin American	African	Other
Metro Vancouver	2,642,825	43.13%	23.28%	14.17%	7.63%	3.34%	2.43%	1.98%	1.58%	2.51%
Vancouver	662,248	43.22%	29.26%	6.90%	9.10%	2.44%	2.25%	2.78%	1.31%	2.74%
Surrey	568,322	30.78%	10.91%	37.81%	9.71%	2.24%	2.16%	1.57%	2.29%	2.53%
Burnaby	249,125	30.46%	38.62%	9.42%	8.37%	3.65%	1.70%	2.50%	2.03%	3.24%
Richmond	209,937	18.94%	57.09%	7.38%	8.85%	1.86%	0.74%	1.03%	0.85%	3.26%
Coquitlam	148,625	41.51%	31.45%	5.02%	5.2%	8.19%	1.98%	2.27%	1.45%	2.92%
Langley Township	132,603	69.53%	10.94%	6.66%	4.15%	1.10%	3.85%	1.31%	1.11%	1.35%
Delta	108,455	51.71%	10.29%	26.09%	4.12%	0.83%	2.96%	0.96%	1.02%	1.99%
Maple Ridge	90,990	73.70%	5.81%	4.72%	4.31%	2.52%	4.68%	1.46%	1.60%	1.20%
North Vancouver (district)	88,168	69.11%	10.27%	3.18%	2.90%	9.04%	1.81%	1.44%	0.54%	1.72%
New Westminster	78,916	50.07%	14.19%	10.38%	10.33%	2.27%	3.11%	3.28%	3.45%	2.91%
Port Coquitlam	61,498	57.35%	16.16%	5.78%	6.52%	4.90%	2.97%	1.91%	2.05%	2.36%
North Vancouver (city)	58,120	61.59%	9.03%	3.65%	7.34%	11.32%	2.14%	2.10%	0.96%	1.87%
West Vancouver	44,122	55.77%	23.03%	3.24%	1.77%	12.24%	0.98%	0.99%	0.43%	1.54%
Port Moody	33,535	64.25%	17.23%	3.00%	2.85%	4.74%	3.08%	1.73%	1.18%	1.96%
Langley City	28,963	69.60%	4.10%	6.99%	6.26%	2.09%	5.69%	1.82%	2.16%	1.27%

==== Historic trends ====
Panethnic groups in Vancouver (1911–2021)
Panethnic group	2021		2016		2011		2006		2001		1996		1991		1986		1981		1971		1961		1941		1931		1911 (Note: Including all subdivisions that comprise contemporary Vancouver; Vancouver City, Vancouver South, Vancouver North, Hastings Townsite, Lot 301, and Point Grey.)	
Panethnic group	Pop.	%	Pop.	%	Pop.	%	Pop.	%	Pop.	%	Pop.	%	Pop.	%	Pop.	%	Pop.	%	Pop.	%	Pop.	%	Pop.	%	Pop.	%	Pop.	%
European	281,105	43.22%	285,295	46.15%	272,645	46.19%	268,715	46.49%	264,695	49.05%	269,535	53.07%	268,595	57.73%	286,465	67.46%	302,720	74.18%	372,320	87.34%	357,915	93.08%	258,234	93.78%	223,647	90.69%	111,731	86.58%
East Asian	190,270	29.26%	186,855	30.23%	182,090	30.85%	186,725	32.3%	175,520	32.53%	152,020	29.93%	117,415	25.23%	78,205	18.42%	64,845	15.89%	35,685	8.37%	18,355	4.77%	15,632	5.68%	21,339	8.65%	6,480	5.02%
Southeast Asian	59,190	9.1%	53,580	8.67%	53,360	9.04%	43,455	7.52%	36,755	6.81%	29,095	5.73%	23,785	5.11%	16,880	3.97%	9,970	2.44%	—N/a	—N/a	—N/a	—N/a	—N/a	—N/a	—N/a	—N/a	—N/a	—N/a
South Asian	44,850	6.9%	37,130	6.01%	35,140	5.95%	32,515	5.63%	30,655	5.68%	26,040	5.13%	23,000	4.94%	17,410	4.1%	14,175	3.47%	7,870	1.85%	1,560	0.41%	506	0.18%	529	0.21%	843	0.65%
Latin American	18,080	2.78%	10,935	1.77%	9,595	1.63%	8,225	1.42%	6,490	1.2%	5,665	1.12%	5,530	1.19%	4,170	0.98%	2,580	0.63%	—N/a	—N/a	—N/a	—N/a	—N/a	—N/a	—N/a	—N/a	—N/a	—N/a
Middle Eastern	15,885	2.44%	11,595	1.88%	9,860	1.67%	7,230	1.25%	4,625	0.86%	3,810	0.75%	3,610	0.78%	2,430	0.57%	1,605	0.39%	—N/a	—N/a	—N/a	—N/a	—N/a	—N/a	—N/a	—N/a	43	0.03%
Indigenous	14,660	2.25%	13,905	2.25%	11,945	2.02%	11,145	1.93%	10,440	1.93%	10,965	2.16%	13,400	2.88%	10,840	2.55%	6,285	1.54%	2,995	0.7%	530	0.14%	136	0.05%	104	0.04%	700	0.54%
African	8,515	1.31%	6,345	1.03%	5,720	0.97%	5,290	0.92%	4,780	0.89%	4,965	0.98%	3,355	0.72%	1,280	0.3%	910	0.22%	785	0.18%	572	0.15%	333	0.12%	257	0.1%	170	0.13%
Other/multiracial	17,825	2.74%	12,570	2.03%	9,855	1.67%	8,310	1.44%	5,665	1.05%	5,830	1.15%	6,610	1.42%	6,990	1.65%	4,995	1.22%	6,610	1.55%	5,590	1.45%	512	0.19%	717	0.29%	9,076	7.03%
Total responses	650,380	98.21%	618,210	97.9%	590,205	97.8%	571,600	98.89%	539,630	98.89%	507,930	98.82%	465,300	98.61%	424,670	98.5%	408,085	100%	426,265	100%	384,522	100%	275,353	100%	246,593	100%	129,043	100%
Total population	662,248	100%	631,486	100%	603,502	100%	578,041	100%	545,671	100%	514,008	100%	471,844	100%	431,147	100%	408,085	100%	426,265	100%	384,522	100%	275,353	100%	246,593	100%	129,043	100%

Panethnic groups in Surrey (1981–2021)
Panethnic group	2021		2016		2011		2006		2001		1996		1991		1986		1981	
Panethnic group	Pop.	%	Pop.	%	Pop.	%	Pop.	%	Pop.	%	Pop.	%	Pop.	%	Pop.	%	Pop.	%
South Asian	212,680	37.81%	168,040	32.85%	142,445	30.74%	107,810	27.47%	75,680	21.89%	49,805	16.36%	24,000	9.86%	9,070	5.03%	4,465	3.05%
European	173,155	30.78%	198,835	38.87%	208,625	45.03%	203,815	51.93%	211,870	61.27%	210,530	69.14%	190,960	78.45%	156,900	87.03%	134,435	91.97%
East Asian	61,360	10.91%	52,025	10.17%	39,270	8.48%	29,965	7.64%	23,600	6.83%	16,845	5.53%	8,650	3.55%	3,715	2.06%	2,565	1.75%
Southeast Asian	54,635	9.71%	44,875	8.77%	39,560	8.54%	25,795	6.57%	16,440	4.75%	10,210	3.35%	5,295	2.18%	3,410	1.89%	1,525	1.04%
African	12,870	2.29%	9,455	1.85%	6,150	1.33%	5,015	1.28%	3,810	1.1%	2,670	0.88%	1,440	0.59%	415	0.23%	—N/a	—N/a
Middle Eastern	12,620	2.24%	9,485	1.85%	5,615	1.21%	3,595	0.92%	2,300	0.67%	1,790	0.59%	1,015	0.42%	380	0.21%	255	0.17%
Indigenous	12,175	2.16%	13,460	2.63%	10,955	2.36%	7,630	1.94%	6,895	1.99%	5,070	1.67%	7,330	3.01%	4,315	2.39%	1,855	1.27%
Latin American	8,830	1.57%	7,065	1.38%	5,340	1.15%	3,785	0.96%	3,315	0.96%	2,140	0.7%	1,670	0.69%	790	0.44%	615	0.42%
Other/multiracial	14,240	2.53%	8,315	1.63%	5,385	1.16%	5,050	1.29%	1,880	0.54%	3,695	1.21%	3,065	1.26%	1,290	0.72%	465	0.32%
Total responses	562,565	98.99%	511,540	98.77%	463,340	98.95%	392,450	99.36%	345,780	99.41%	302,750	99.43%	243,425	99.29%	180,285	99.36%	146,180	99.35%
Total population	568,322	100%	517,887	100%	468,251	100%	394,976	100%	347,825	100%	304,477	100%	245,173	100%	181,447	100%	147,138	100%

Panethnic groups in Burnaby (1981–2021)
Panethnic group	2021		2016		2011		2006		2001		1996		1991		1986		1981	
Panethnic group	Pop.	%	Pop.	%	Pop.	%	Pop.	%	Pop.	%	Pop.	%	Pop.	%	Pop.	%	Pop.	%
East Asian	94,895	38.62%	89,470	38.89%	79,205	35.96%	71,435	35.57%	59,090	30.88%	45,825	25.92%	25,070	16.03%	11,490	8.06%	9,635	7.2%
European	74,860	30.46%	79,575	34.59%	86,015	39.05%	86,560	43.1%	95,165	49.73%	104,735	59.23%	111,210	71.1%	115,415	80.92%	115,705	86.46%
South Asian	23,155	9.42%	18,735	8.14%	17,480	7.94%	16,840	8.38%	14,960	7.82%	10,695	6.05%	7,945	5.08%	6,170	4.33%	3,880	2.9%
Southeast Asian	20,560	8.37%	17,620	7.66%	16,850	7.65%	10,915	5.43%	7,965	4.16%	4,390	2.48%	3,060	1.96%	2,225	1.56%	1,385	1.03%
Middle Eastern	8,975	3.65%	6,660	2.89%	5,975	2.71%	3,700	1.84%	3,580	1.87%	2,400	1.36%	1,245	0.8%	1,775	1.24%	770	0.58%
Latin American	6,155	2.5%	4,630	2.01%	3,765	1.71%	2,785	1.39%	3,020	1.58%	1,825	1.03%	1,425	0.91%	890	0.62%	335	0.25%
African	4,985	2.03%	3,670	1.6%	3,445	1.56%	2,450	1.22%	2,480	1.3%	2,605	1.47%	1,030	0.66%	545	0.38%	385	0.29%
Indigenous	4,175	1.7%	4,195	1.82%	3,295	1.5%	3,005	1.5%	3,145	1.64%	2,500	1.41%	3,745	2.39%	2,635	1.85%	1,305	0.98%
Other/multiracial	7,965	3.24%	5,530	2.4%	4,220	1.92%	3,170	1.58%	1,975	1.03%	1,835	1.04%	1,685	1.08%	1,490	1.04%	420	0.31%
Total responses	245,725	98.64%	230,080	98.85%	220,255	98.67%	200,855	99.04%	191,380	98.67%	176,825	98.67%	156,415	98.46%	142,635	98.26%	133,820	98.04%
Total population	249,125	100%	232,755	100%	223,218	100%	202,799	100%	193,954	100%	179,209	100%	158,858	100%	145,161	100%	136,494	100%

Panethnic groups in Richmond (1931–2021)
Panethnic group	2021		2016		2011		2006		2001		1996		1991		1986		1981		1971		1961		1941		1931	
Panethnic group	Pop.	%	Pop.	%	Pop.	%	Pop.	%	Pop.	%	Pop.	%	Pop.	%	Pop.	%	Pop.	%	Pop.	%	Pop.	%	Pop.	%	Pop.	%
East Asian	118,980	57.09%	109,415	55.64%	94,180	49.75%	80,245	46.23%	68,785	42.1%	52,470	35.42%	26,805	21.27%	12,560	11.63%	10,215	10.66%	2,745	4.42%	1,829	4.22%	3,007	29%	3,262	39.87%
European	39,465	18.94%	45,050	22.91%	54,050	28.55%	59,335	34.19%	65,845	40.3%	73,845	49.84%	81,825	64.94%	81,840	75.81%	76,570	79.9%	56,645	91.2%	40,734	94.02%	7,185	69.29%	4,871	59.53%
Southeast Asian	18,435	8.85%	15,530	7.9%	14,820	7.83%	11,035	6.36%	8,445	5.17%	5,585	3.77%	3,490	2.77%	2,685	2.49%	1,875	1.96%	—N/a	—N/a	—N/a	—N/a	—N/a	—N/a	—N/a	—N/a
South Asian	15,370	7.38%	14,360	7.3%	14,515	7.67%	13,860	7.99%	12,120	7.42%	9,815	6.63%	8,320	6.6%	6,945	6.43%	4,365	4.55%	495	0.8%	151	0.35%	43	0.41%	5	0.06%
Middle Eastern	3,875	1.86%	2,715	1.38%	2,205	1.16%	2,115	1.22%	2,030	1.24%	1,495	1.01%	925	0.73%	155	0.14%	—N/a	—N/a	—N/a	—N/a	—N/a	—N/a	—N/a	—N/a	—N/a	—N/a
Indigenous	1,540	0.74%	1,595	0.81%	1,935	1.02%	1,275	0.73%	1,165	0.71%	1,210	0.82%	1,940	1.54%	1,455	1.35%	680	0.71%	230	0.37%	91	0.21%	2	0.02%	1	0.01%
Latin American	2,155	1.03%	1,585	0.81%	1,680	0.89%	1,265	0.73%	1,165	0.71%	685	0.46%	520	0.41%	535	0.5%	610	0.64%	—N/a	—N/a	—N/a	—N/a	—N/a	—N/a	—N/a	—N/a
African	1,775	0.85%	1,270	0.65%	1,245	0.66%	1,390	0.8%	1,470	0.9%	1,145	0.77%	650	0.52%	505	0.47%	310	0.32%	65	0.1%	23	0.05%	8	0.08%	3	0.04%
Other/multiracial	6,800	3.26%	5,155	2.62%	4,675	2.47%	3,040	1.75%	2,380	1.46%	1,900	1.28%	1,520	1.21%	1,280	1.19%	1,055	1.1%	1,930	3.11%	495	1.14%	125	1.21%	40	0.49%
Total responses	208,400	99.27%	196,660	99.17%	189,305	99.39%	173,565	99.49%	163,395	99.42%	148,150	99.52%	125,995	99.5%	107,960	99.51%	95,835	99.67%	62,110	99.98%	43,323	100%	10,370	100%	8,182	100%
Total population	209,937	100%	198,309	100%	190,473	100%	174,461	100%	164,345	100%	148,867	100%	126,624	100%	108,492	100%	96,154	100%	62,121	100%	43,323	100%	10,370	100%	8,182	100%

Panethnic groups in Coquitlam (1981–2021)
Panethnic group	2021		2016		2011		2006		2001		1996		1991		1986		1981	
Panethnic group	Pop.	%	Pop.	%	Pop.	%	Pop.	%	Pop.	%	Pop.	%	Pop.	%	Pop.	%	Pop.	%
European	61,220	41.51%	65,730	47.6%	67,655	54.12%	68,120	59.99%	71,755	64.4%	71,360	71.13%	65,475	79.46%	59,215	87.73%	54,185	91.68%
East Asian	46,375	31.45%	40,400	29.26%	30,715	24.57%	26,710	23.52%	25,030	22.46%	18,010	17.95%	8,360	10.15%	3,125	4.63%	1,980	3.35%
Middle Eastern	12,080	8.19%	9,140	6.62%	7,375	5.9%	4,885	4.3%	2,965	2.66%	1,215	1.21%	640	0.78%	200	0.3%	—N/a	—N/a
Southeast Asian	7,675	5.2%	7,205	5.22%	6,415	5.13%	4,110	3.62%	3,710	3.33%	2,575	2.57%	1,690	2.05%	585	0.87%	315	0.53%
South Asian	7,405	5.02%	6,220	4.5%	5,245	4.2%	4,185	3.69%	3,280	2.94%	3,455	3.44%	2,295	2.79%	1,835	2.72%	1,265	2.14%
Latin American	3,345	2.27%	2,190	1.59%	1,895	1.52%	1,530	1.35%	1,110	1%	745	0.74%	525	0.64%	325	0.48%	255	0.43%
Indigenous	2,915	1.98%	3,095	2.24%	2,610	2.09%	1,565	1.38%	1,480	1.33%	1,240	1.24%	2,190	2.66%	1,380	2.04%	520	0.88%
African	2,135	1.45%	1,515	1.1%	1,265	1.01%	1,005	0.88%	1,130	1.01%	865	0.86%	640	0.78%	300	0.44%	255	0.43%
Other/multiracial	4,300	2.92%	2,590	1.88%	1,840	1.47%	1,455	1.28%	970	0.87%	860	0.86%	590	0.72%	530	0.79%	330	0.56%
Total responses	147,465	99.22%	138,095	99.15%	125,015	98.56%	113,560	99.12%	111,425	98.7%	100,330	98.54%	82,405	98.08%	67,495	97.41%	59,105	96.77%
Total population	148,625	100%	139,284	100%	126,840	100%	114,565	100%	112,890	100%	101,820	100%	84,021	100%	69,291	100%	61,077	100%

Panethnic groups in Langley Township (1981–2021)
Panethnic group	2021		2016		2011		2006		2001		1996		1991		1986		1981	
Panethnic group	Pop.	%	Pop.	%	Pop.	%	Pop.	%	Pop.	%	Pop.	%	Pop.	%	Pop.	%	Pop.	%
European	91,055	69.53%	89,920	77.63%	85,840	83.23%	81,310	87.39%	78,195	90.69%	74,295	93.26%	60,970	92.89%	49,905	94.12%	42,240	95.25%
East Asian	14,330	10.94%	9,255	7.99%	6,470	6.27%	4,820	5.18%	3,000	3.48%	1,880	2.36%	955	1.46%	445	0.84%	310	0.7%
South Asian	8,720	6.66%	5,140	4.44%	2,765	2.68%	1,445	1.55%	1,485	1.72%	740	0.93%	630	0.96%	720	1.36%	380	0.86%
Southeast Asian	5,435	4.15%	3,515	3.03%	2,455	2.38%	1,475	1.59%	905	1.05%	700	0.88%	445	0.68%	165	0.31%	80	0.18%
Indigenous	5,045	3.85%	4,310	3.72%	3,495	3.39%	2,450	2.63%	1,950	2.26%	1,155	1.45%	1,970	3%	1,435	2.71%	965	2.18%
Latin American	1,715	1.31%	1,100	0.95%	650	0.63%	395	0.42%	190	0.22%	210	0.26%	70	0.11%	60	0.11%	40	0.09%
African	1,450	1.11%	1,205	1.04%	470	0.46%	575	0.62%	275	0.32%	295	0.37%	195	0.3%	120	0.23%	95	0.21%
Middle Eastern	1,440	1.1%	715	0.62%	410	0.4%	295	0.32%	60	0.07%	215	0.27%	50	0.08%	10	0.02%	10	0.02%
Other/multiracial	1,770	1.35%	680	0.59%	600	0.58%	280	0.3%	170	0.2%	170	0.21%	350	0.53%	195	0.37%	225	0.51%
Total responses	130,960	98.76%	115,835	98.76%	103,140	99%	93,040	99.27%	86,220	99.22%	79,665	99.36%	65,635	99.39%	53,025	99.23%	44,345	99.39%
Total population	132,603	100%	117,285	100%	104,177	100%	93,726	100%	86,896	100%	80,179	100%	66,040	100%	53,434	100%	44,617	100%

Panethnic groups in Delta (2001–2021)
Panethnic group	2021		2016		2011		2006		2001	
Panethnic group	Pop.	%	Pop.	%	Pop.	%	Pop.	%	Pop.	%
European	55,465	51.71%	61,835	61.32%	66,630	67.48%	68,400	71.19%	72,375	75.1%
South Asian	27,990	26.09%	20,485	20.31%	17,030	17.25%	14,220	14.8%	12,035	12.49%
East Asian	11,040	10.29%	9,320	9.24%	7,065	7.16%	7,280	7.58%	6,675	6.93%
Southeast Asian	4,420	4.12%	3,240	3.21%	3,165	3.21%	2,280	2.37%	2,060	2.14%
Indigenous	3,180	2.96%	2,710	2.69%	2,290	2.32%	1,700	1.77%	1,495	1.55%
African	1,095	1.02%	795	0.79%	595	0.6%	495	0.52%	610	0.63%
Latin American	1,035	0.96%	815	0.81%	710	0.72%	710	0.74%	490	0.51%
Middle Eastern	890	0.83%	515	0.51%	240	0.24%	280	0.29%	220	0.23%
Other/multiracial	2,140	1.99%	1,120	1.11%	1,010	1.02%	715	0.74%	420	0.44%
Total responses	107,270	98.91%	100,845	98.64%	98,740	98.88%	96,075	99.33%	96,370	99.4%
Total population	108,455	100%	102,238	100%	99,863	100%	96,723	100%	96,950	100%

Panethnic groups in Maple Ridge (2001–2021)
Panethnic group	2021		2016		2011		2006		2001	
Panethnic group	Pop.	%	Pop.	%	Pop.	%	Pop.	%	Pop.	%
European	66,230	73.7%	65,040	80.33%	63,550	84.58%	58,970	86.52%	55,795	89.44%
East Asian	5,225	5.81%	3,750	4.63%	2,800	3.73%	2,545	3.73%	1,760	2.82%
South Asian	4,245	4.72%	2,480	3.06%	1,785	2.38%	1,675	2.46%	1,375	2.2%
Indigenous	4,205	4.68%	3,815	4.71%	2,695	3.59%	1,870	2.74%	1,555	2.49%
Southeast Asian	3,870	4.31%	2,515	3.11%	1,960	2.61%	1,365	2%	550	0.88%
Middle Eastern	2,265	2.52%	900	1.11%	465	0.62%	360	0.53%	250	0.4%
African	1,440	1.6%	945	1.17%	940	1.25%	695	1.02%	635	1.02%
Latin American	1,310	1.46%	875	1.08%	480	0.64%	385	0.56%	200	0.32%
Other/multiracial	1,075	1.2%	660	0.82%	470	0.63%	290	0.43%	255	0.41%
Total responses	89,860	98.76%	80,970	98.44%	75,140	98.8%	68,160	98.86%	62,380	98.75%
Total population	90,990	100%	82,256	100%	76,052	100%	68,949	100%	63,169	100%

Panethnic groups in North Vancouver (District) (2001–2021)
Panethnic group	2021		2016		2011		2006		2001	
Panethnic group	Pop.	%	Pop.	%	Pop.	%	Pop.	%	Pop.	%
European	60,390	69.11%	61,770	72.77%	64,095	76.71%	62,950	76.85%	65,110	79.72%
East Asian	8,975	10.27%	8,720	10.27%	7,555	9.04%	8,260	10.08%	7,450	9.12%
Middle Eastern	7,900	9.04%	5,705	6.72%	4,680	5.6%	3,755	4.58%	3,505	4.29%
South Asian	2,780	3.18%	3,060	3.61%	2,245	2.69%	2,605	3.18%	2,310	2.83%
Southeast Asian	2,530	2.9%	2,250	2.65%	2,285	2.73%	1,765	2.15%	1,165	1.43%
Indigenous	1,580	1.81%	1,360	1.6%	1,080	1.29%	755	0.92%	830	1.02%
Latin American	1,255	1.44%	780	0.92%	790	0.95%	740	0.9%	660	0.81%
African	475	0.54%	470	0.55%	235	0.28%	455	0.56%	295	0.36%
Other/multiracial	1,505	1.72%	765	0.9%	595	0.71%	630	0.77%	355	0.43%
Total responses	87,385	99.11%	84,880	98.77%	83,555	98.98%	81,910	99.21%	81,675	99.23%
Total population	88,168	100%	85,935	100%	84,412	100%	82,562	100%	82,310	100%

Panethnic groups in New Westminster (1911–2021)
Panethnic group	2021		2016		2011		2006		2001		1996		1991		1986		1981		1971		1961		1941		1931		1911	
Panethnic group	Pop.	%	Pop.	%	Pop.	%	Pop.	%	Pop.	%	Pop.	%	Pop.	%	Pop.	%	Pop.	%	Pop.	%	Pop.	%	Pop.	%	Pop.	%	Pop.	%
European	39,080	50.07%	40,400	57.79%	40,225	61.8%	38,920	67.28%	38,805	72.11%	38,245	78.53%	35,700	83.69%	34,255	88.43%	34,245	91.97%	39,445	91.96%	32,064	95.28%	20,587	93.72%	16,194	92.41%	11,247	85.21%
East Asian	11,075	14.19%	9,465	13.54%	7,475	11.48%	5,270	9.11%	3,850	7.15%	2,275	4.67%	1,465	3.43%	640	1.65%	545	1.46%	390	0.91%	314	0.93%	966	4.4%	1,200	6.85%	976	7.39%
South Asian	8,105	10.38%	5,790	8.28%	5,500	8.45%	4,660	8.06%	4,220	7.84%	3,050	6.26%	1,830	4.29%	1,680	4.34%	1,190	3.2%	765	1.78%	244	0.73%	116	0.53%	84	0.48%	74	0.56%
Southeast Asian	8,065	10.33%	6,550	9.37%	5,415	8.32%	3,680	6.36%	2,795	5.19%	1,460	3%	620	1.45%	440	1.14%	265	0.71%	—N/a	—N/a	—N/a	—N/a	—N/a	—N/a	—N/a	—N/a	—N/a	—N/a
African	2,695	3.45%	1,740	2.49%	1,155	1.77%	1,370	2.37%	1,120	2.08%	875	1.8%	360	0.84%	160	0.41%	60	0.16%	90	0.21%	16	0.05%	6	0.03%	7	0.04%	21	0.16%
Latin American	2,560	3.28%	1,275	1.82%	1,155	1.77%	815	1.41%	350	0.65%	350	0.72%	255	0.6%	120	0.31%	60	0.16%	—N/a	—N/a	—N/a	—N/a	—N/a	—N/a	—N/a	—N/a	—N/a	—N/a
Indigenous	2,425	3.11%	2,295	3.28%	2,240	3.44%	1,835	3.17%	1,590	2.95%	1,375	2.82%	1,740	4.08%	1,145	2.96%	595	1.6%	285	0.66%	114	0.34%	64	0.29%	17	0.1%	37	0.28%
Middle Eastern	1,775	2.27%	1,300	1.86%	1,315	2.02%	890	1.54%	680	1.26%	590	1.21%	290	0.68%	25	0.06%	75	0.2%	—N/a	—N/a	—N/a	—N/a	—N/a	—N/a	—N/a	—N/a	—N/a	—N/a
Other/multiracial	2,275	2.91%	1,085	1.55%	610	0.94%	405	0.7%	400	0.74%	485	1%	395	0.93%	270	0.7%	200	0.54%	1,920	4.48%	902	2.68%	228	1.04%	22	0.13%	844	6.39%
Total responses	78,055	98.91%	69,905	98.46%	65,090	98.66%	57,850	98.81%	53,810	98.45%	48,700	98.68%	42,655	97.87%	38,735	96.91%	37,235	96.59%	42,895	100.14%	33,654	100%	21,967	100%	17,524	100%	13,199	100%
Total population	78,916	100%	70,996	100%	65,976	100%	58,549	100%	54,656	100%	49,350	100%	43,585	100%	39,972	100%	38,550	100%	42,835	100%	33,654	100%	21,967	100%	17,524	100%	13,199	100%

Panethnic groups in Port Coquitlam (2001–2021)
Panethnic group	2021		2016		2011		2006		2001	
Panethnic group	Pop.	%	Pop.	%	Pop.	%	Pop.	%	Pop.	%
European	34,635	57.35%	37,125	64.12%	38,070	68.25%	37,900	72.56%	38,440	75.66%
East Asian	9,760	16.16%	8,420	14.54%	7,250	13%	6,755	12.93%	5,635	11.09%
Southeast Asian	3,940	6.52%	3,090	5.34%	2,345	4.2%	1,595	3.05%	1,245	2.45%
South Asian	3,490	5.78%	2,790	4.82%	2,815	5.05%	2,445	4.68%	2,285	4.5%
Middle Eastern	2,960	4.9%	1,745	3.01%	1,155	2.07%	1,030	1.97%	830	1.63%
Indigenous	1,795	2.97%	1,985	3.43%	1,790	3.21%	905	1.73%	1,030	2.03%
African	1,235	2.05%	885	1.53%	845	1.51%	550	1.05%	710	1.4%
Latin American	1,155	1.91%	925	1.6%	955	1.71%	440	0.84%	285	0.56%
Other/multiracial	1,425	2.36%	940	1.62%	560	1%	605	1.16%	330	0.65%
Total responses	60,390	98.2%	57,895	98.78%	55,780	99%	52,230	99.13%	50,805	99.12%
Total population	61,498	100%	58,612	100%	56,342	100%	52,687	100%	51,257	100%

Panethnic groups in North Vancouver (city) (2001–2021)
Panethnic group	2021		2016		2011		2006		2001	
Panethnic group	Pop.	%	Pop.	%	Pop.	%	Pop.	%	Pop.	%
European	35,420	61.59%	34,695	66.48%	32,800	68.78%	32,160	71.69%	32,960	75.03%
Middle Eastern	6,510	11.32%	4,575	8.77%	3,655	7.66%	3,155	7.03%	3,015	6.86%
East Asian	5,195	9.03%	4,260	8.16%	3,775	7.92%	3,995	8.91%	3,255	7.41%
Southeast Asian	4,220	7.34%	3,715	7.12%	3,470	7.28%	2,150	4.79%	1,650	3.76%
South Asian	2,100	3.65%	1,840	3.53%	1,475	3.09%	1,340	2.99%	980	2.23%
Indigenous	1,230	2.14%	1,150	2.2%	970	2.03%	925	2.06%	1,015	2.31%
Latin American	1,210	2.1%	840	1.61%	585	1.23%	430	0.96%	470	1.07%
African	550	0.96%	485	0.93%	390	0.82%	315	0.7%	315	0.72%
Other/multiracial	1,075	1.87%	630	1.21%	575	1.21%	385	0.86%	275	0.63%
Total responses	57,505	98.94%	52,185	98.65%	47,685	98.94%	44,860	99.32%	43,930	99.16%
Total population	58,120	100%	52,898	100%	48,196	100%	45,165	100%	44,303	100%

=== Federal electoral districts ===
Panethnic origins by federal electoral districts in Metro Vancouver (2021 census)
Riding	Total population	European	East Asian	South Asian	Southeast Asian	Middle Eastern	Indigenous	Latin American	African	Other
Langley—Aldergrove	133,168	69.04%	10.04%	8.34%	3.73%	1.11%	3.93%	1.31%	1.16%	1.33%
Coquitlam—Port Coquitlam	132,004	46.03%	27.02%	4.75%	5.17%	8.52%	2.21%	2.15%	1.47%	2.69%
Surrey Centre	131,670	22.19%	7.45%	40.04%	14.46%	4.17%	2.82%	2.27%	3.5%	3.12%
Cloverdale—Langley City	130,665	53.12%	6.48%	21.26%	7.97%	1.5%	3.66%	1.72%	2.15%	2.13%
Vancouver Centre	126,995	56.77%	17.66%	5.04%	3.43%	6.79%	2.1%	4.54%	1.39%	2.27%
New Westminster—Burnaby	125,253	40.74%	20.98%	11.34%	11.06%	3.48%	2.53%	2.92%	3.73%	3.2%
Fleetwood—Port Kells	124,987	22.28%	17.97%	34.56%	14.97%	2.13%	1.59%	1.46%	1.96%	3.1%
North Vancouver	123,025	64.42%	9.69%	3.46%	4.95%	11.04%	2.2%	1.77%	0.66%	1.81%
Surrey—Newton	122,264	15.05%	2.97%	66.73%	5.85%	1.97%	1.63%	1.24%	2.3%	2.25%
Burnaby South	120,305	25.18%	43.09%	10.66%	9.01%	3.12%	1.48%	2.65%	1.53%	3.29%
South Surrey—White Rock	119,672	60.08%	18.65%	12.09%	2.69%	0.84%	2.12%	1.02%	1.14%	1.37%
Vancouver East	118,675	51.5%	22.49%	3.38%	8.15%	1.5%	5.22%	2.93%	1.9%	2.92%
Port Moody—Coquitlam	114,853	52.24%	23.73%	5.07%	5.17%	4.89%	2.65%	2.03%	1.64%	2.58%
Delta	110,721	51.7%	10.46%	25.68%	4.13%	0.86%	3.15%	0.97%	1.02%	2.01%
Pitt Meadows—Maple Ridge	110,416	73.24%	5.92%	4.82%	4.51%	2.47%	4.76%	1.47%	1.48%	1.32%
Vancouver Granville	109,799	46.17%	34.77%	4.6%	5.16%	1.81%	1.62%	2.22%	1.12%	2.52%
Vancouver South	109,339	18.68%	38.14%	17.84%	16%	1%	1.41%	2.33%	1.25%	3.35%
Vancouver Quadra	109,328	53.96%	31.58%	3.46%	2.37%	2.42%	1.87%	1.59%	0.8%	1.96%
Burnaby North—Seymour	108,794	49.05%	29.13%	4.94%	4.69%	3.48%	2.51%	2.16%	1.42%	2.6%
Vancouver Kingsway	108,054	27.58%	35.53%	7.29%	19.4%	0.99%	1.73%	2.69%	1.31%	3.46%
Richmond Centre	107,707	17.2%	62.92%	4.91%	7.38%	1.83%	0.77%	1.08%	0.73%	3.17%
Steveston—Richmond East	102,230	20.76%	50.98%	9.95%	10.38%	1.89%	0.71%	0.99%	0.98%	0.71%

=== Ethnic groups ===
==== Indigenous peoples ====
As of around 2009, 3% of residents of Vancouver state that they have at least some ancestry from the First Nations, and of that 3%, over half state that they also have non-First Nations ancestry. A person with some First Nations ancestry may not necessarily identify as someone who is First Nations.

There is a small community of aboriginal people in Vancouver as well as in the surrounding metropolitan region, with the result that Vancouver constitutes the largest native community in the province, albeit an unincorporated one (i.e. not as a band government). There is an equally large or larger Métis contingent.

Indigenous peoples, who make up less than two percent of the city's population, are not considered a visible minority group by Statistics Canada.

Indigenous Population in Vancouver
Aboriginal group	First Nations	7,865	1.3%	7,510	1.3%
Aboriginal group	Métis	3,595	0.6%	3,235	0.6%
Aboriginal group	Inuit	70	0%	45	0%
Aboriginal group	Aboriginal, n.i.e.	305	0.1%	210	0%
Aboriginal group	Multiple Aboriginal identities	100	0%	140	0%
Total Aboriginal population		11,945	2%	11,145	1.9%
Total population		590,210	100%	571,600	100%

==== Europeans ====
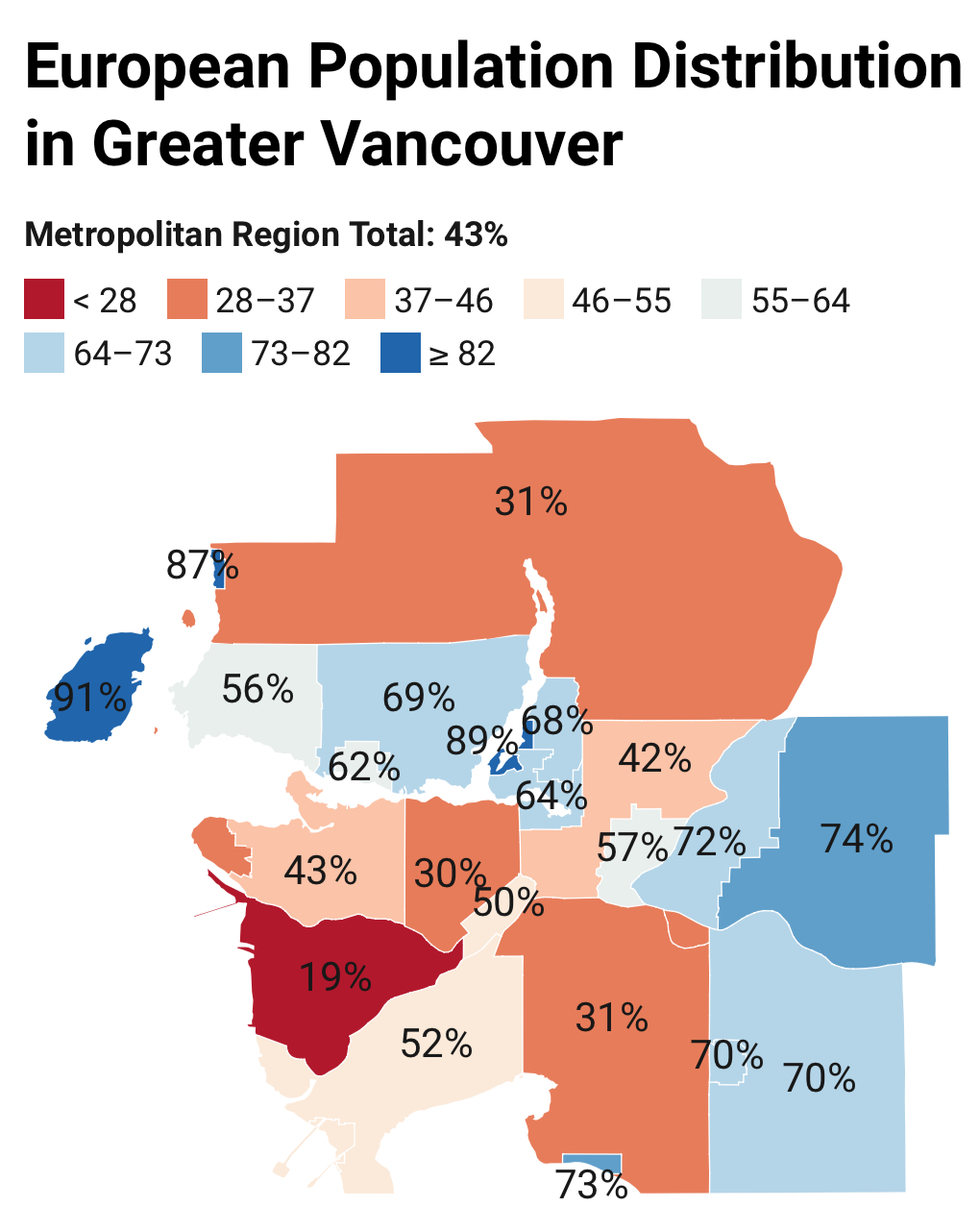
European population distribution by municipalities, 2021 census

===== British & Irish =====
Much of the ethnic white population consists of persons whose origins go back to Britain or Ireland and, until recently, British Columbians with British or Irish ancestry most likely came directly from those islands, rather than via Ontario, the Maritime provinces, or the United States. Until the 1960s, it was easier to purchase the Times of London and The Guardian in Vancouver than it was to find the Toronto Globe and Mail or Montreal Gazette.

===== Continental Europeans =====
Other large and historically important European ethnic groups consist of Germans, Dutch, French (of both European and Canadian origin), Ukrainians, Scandinavians, Finns, Italians, Croats, Hungarians, Greeks, and lately numerous Romanians, Russians, Portuguese, Serbs and Poles. Non-visible minorities such as newly arrived Eastern Europeans and the new wave of Latin Americans are also a feature of the city's ethnic landscape. Prior to the Hong Kong influx of the 1980s, the largest non-British Isles ethnic group in the city was German, followed by Ukrainian and the Scandinavian ethnicities. Most of these earlier East European immigrant are fully assimilated or intermarried with other groups, although a new generation of East Europeans form a distinct linguistic and social community.

==== East Asians ====
===== Chinese =====
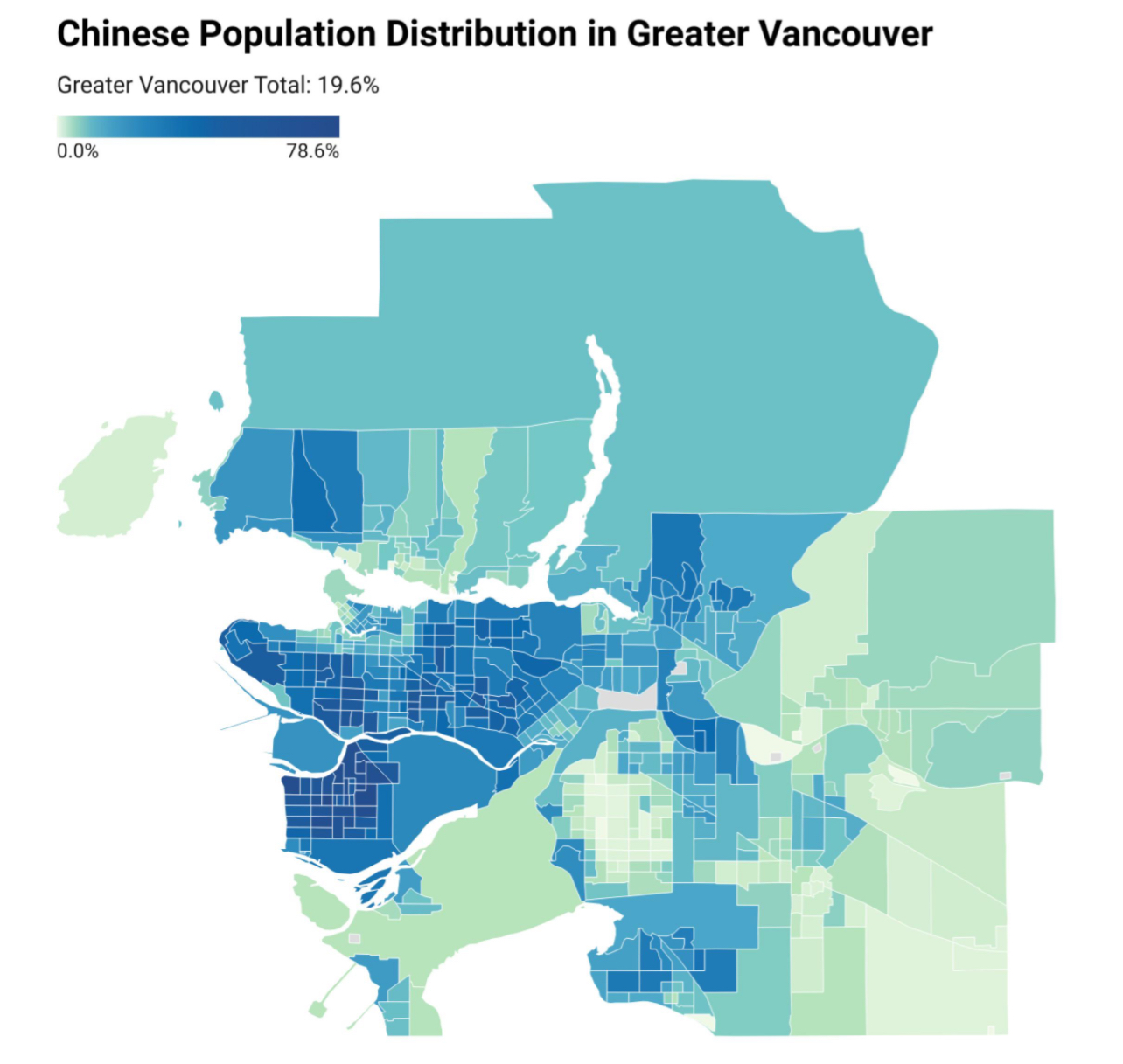
Chinese population distribution, 2021 census

The first Chinese immigrants to British Columbia were men who came to "the British Colonies of Canada," as they called British Columbia, for the Fraser Canyon Gold Rush of 1858 and a decade later to work on building the Canadian Pacific Railway.

===== Koreans =====
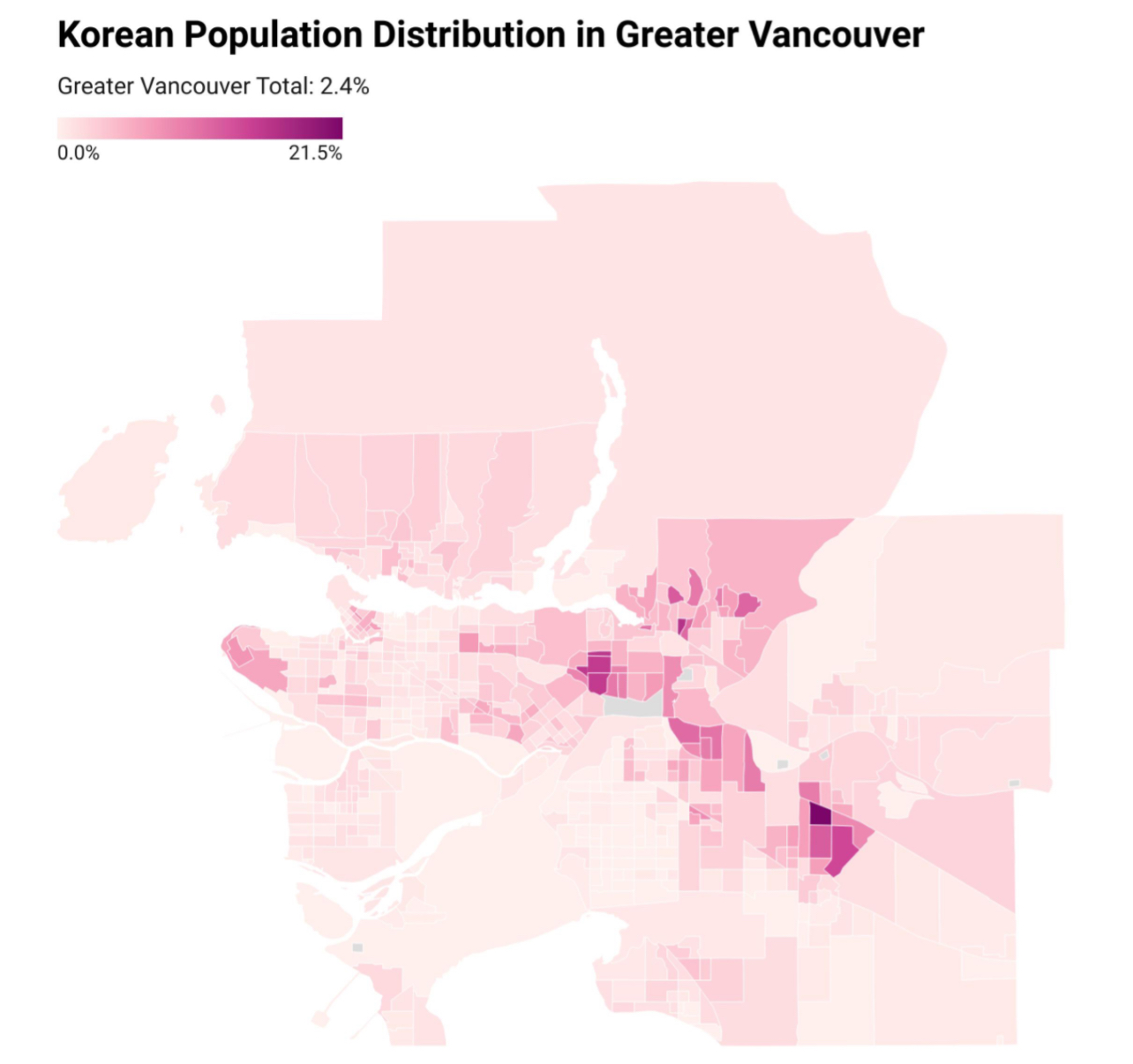
Korean population distribution, 2021 census

As of 2014, there are about 70,000 ethnic Koreans in the Vancouver area.

An H-Mart and several Korean restaurants are located on Robson Street. As of 2008, there are many Korean national students at the university and primary/secondary levels studying English. Other areas with Korean businesses include Kingsway in Vancouver, Burnaby, and New Westminster; other areas in Vancouver; North Road in Burnaby and Coquitlam, and areas of Port Coquitlam. As of 2011, Coquitlam is a popular area of settlement for Koreans.

Rimhak Ree (Yi Yimhak) came to Vancouver to study mathematics at the University of British Columbia in 1953, making him the first known ethnic Korean to live in the city. There were about 50 ethnic Koreans in Vancouver in the mid-1960s. The first Korean United Church congregation in the city opened in 1965. Numbers of Korean immigration to Canada increased due to more permissive immigration laws established in the 1960s as well as the home country's political conflict and poverty. There were 1,670 ethnic Koreans in Vancouver by 1975, making up 16% of all ethnic Koreans in Canada and a 3000% increase from the mid-1960s population. Korean immigration to Canada decreased after a more restrictive immigration law was enacted in 1978.

Christianity is a popular religion among ethnic Koreans. About 200 Korean churches are in the Vancouver area.

In 1986 Greater Vancouver had fewer than 5,000 ethnic Koreans. In 1991 the number had increased to 8,330. The number of ethnic Koreans in the Vancouver area increased by 69% in the period 1996 through 2001. The number of university students from Korea choosing to study in Vancouver had become most of the Korean students studying in Canada by the late 1990s. The first Korean grocery store in the North Road area opened in 2000. In 2001 28,850 ethnic Koreans live in Greater Vancouver, and this increased to 44,825 according to the 2006 census.

Canwest Global does a co-venture with the Canada Express, a Korean publication, to serve ethnic Koreans. It previously published a Korean edition of the Vancouver Sun but later stopped. Daniel Ahadi and Catherine A. Murray, authors of "Urban Mediascapes and Multicultural Flows: Assessing Vancouver's Communication Infrastructure," wrote that the Korean edition of the Vancouver Sun was "error-fraught".

==== South Asians ====
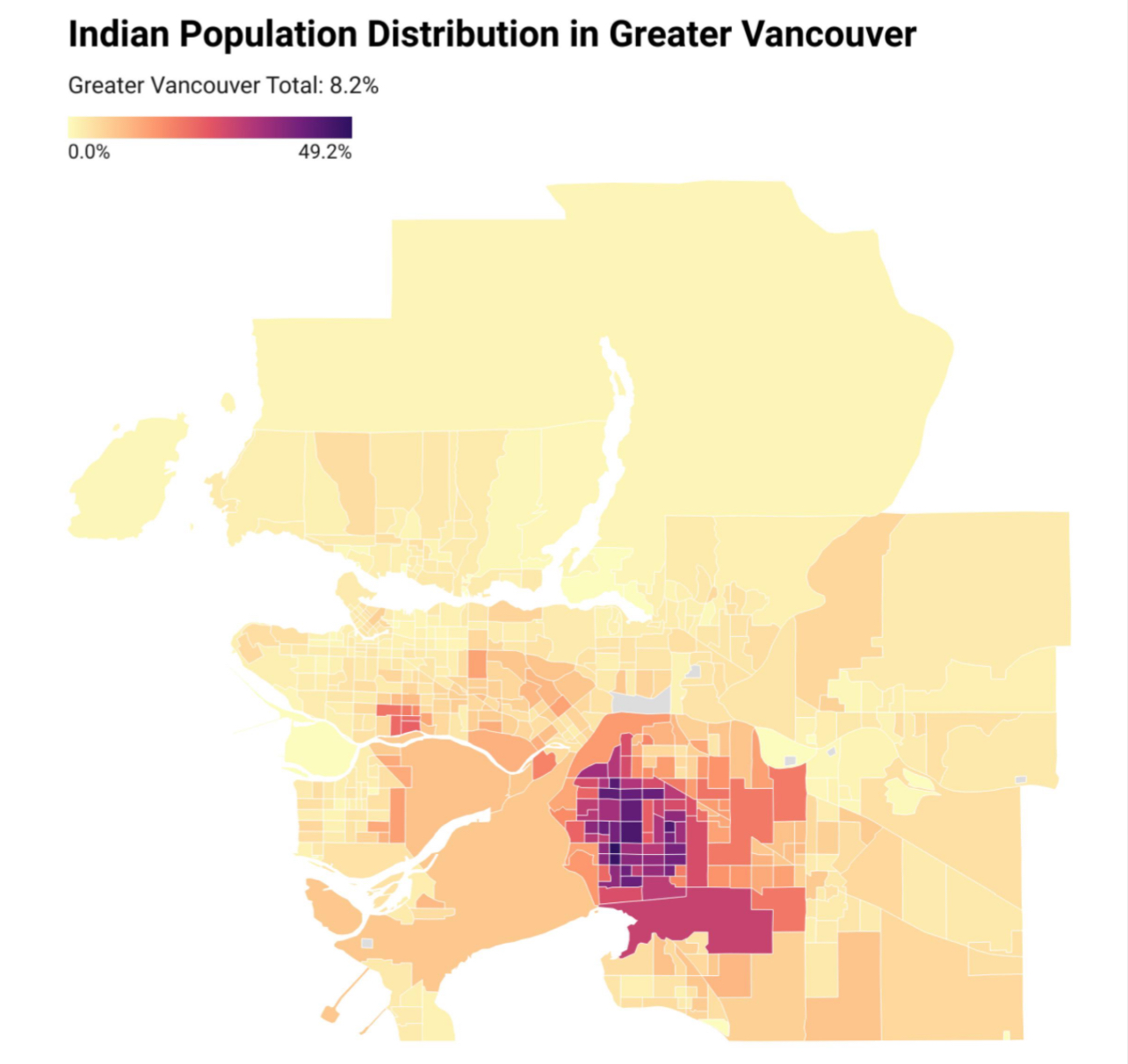
Indian population distribution, 2021 census

===== Punjabis =====
Punjabi immigrants first arrived in Vancouver during the late 19th century. Most ethnic South Asians in the Lower Mainland are Punjabi Sikhs. Surrey has the largest ethnic South Asian population in Metro Vancouver, at 32.4%. The Newton neighbourhood in Surrey contains the highest percentage of ethnic Indians in a neighbourhood in Metro Vancouver.

==== Other Asians ====
Other significant Asian ethnic groups in Vancouver are Vietnamese, Filipino, Cambodian and Japanese. In Vancouver the term 'Asian' is normally used to refer only to East Asian and Southeast Asian peoples, while South Asians are usually referred to as Indo-Canadian or East Indians. Technically, though, the term 'Asian' may refer to either group, and also to the large Persian and other Middle Eastern populations as well as elements from Central Asia.

=== Future projections ===
2041 panethnic origin projections (as of 2022)
	2041	
	Population	%
European	1,243,500	30.62%
East Asian	1,054,000	25.95%
South Asian	757,000	18.64%
Southeast Asian	385,000	9.48%
Middle Eastern	202,000	4.97%
Latin American	112,000	2.76%
Indigenous	105,500	2.6%
African	90,000	2.22%
Other/multiracial	112,000	2.76%
Projected Metro Vancouver population	4,061,000	100%

== Language ==
=== Language knowledge ===
The question on knowledge of languages allows for multiple responses. The following figures are from the 2021 Canadian census and lists languages that were selected by at least 1,000 respondents.

Language knowledge in Metro Vancouver
Language	2021	
Language	Pop.	%
English	2,465,855	94.59%
Mandarin	292,725	11.23%
Punjabi	239,205	9.18%
Cantonese	233,745	8.97%
French	171,640	6.58%
Hindi	110,490	4.24%
Tagalog	109,935	4.22%
Spanish	94,555	3.63%
Korean	61,165	2.35%
Iranian Persian	52,290	2.01%
German	35,110	1.35%
Vietnamese	34,655	1.33%
Japanese	31,765	1.22%
Russian	29,885	1.15%
Arabic	28,450	1.09%
Italian	24,325	0.93%
Portuguese	23,835	0.91%
Min Nan	22,615	0.87%
Urdu	21,970	0.84%
Serbo-Croatian	17,080	0.66%
Polish	13,165	0.5%
Gujarati	12,615	0.48%
Ilocano	9,645	0.37%
Romanian	8,735	0.34%
Tamil	8,440	0.32%
Dutch	8,285	0.32%
Dari	7,840	0.3%
Turkish	7,840	0.3%
Ukrainian	7,515	0.29%
Greek	7,010	0.27%
Indonesian	5,895	0.23%
Hebrew	5,655	0.22%
Bengali	5,330	0.2%
Hungarian	5,250	0.2%
Czech	4,785	0.18%
Afrikaans	4,765	0.18%
Malayalam	4,615	0.18%
Wu Chinese	4,550	0.17%
Cebuano	4,315	0.17%
Telugu	3,940	0.15%
Swahili	3,930	0.15%
Kurdish	3,720	0.14%
Thai	3,500	0.13%
Hakka	3,385	0.13%
Tigrigna	3,095	0.12%
Sinhala	3,045	0.12%
Malay	2,955	0.11%
Marathi	2,935	0.11%
Slovak	2,835	0.11%
Kacchi	2,750	0.11%
Hiligaynon	2,655	0.1%
Amharic	2,590	0.1%
Swedish	2,540	0.1%
Pashto	2,445	0.09%
Danish	2,255	0.09%
Aramaic	2,125	0.08%
Somali	1,970	0.08%
Bulgarian	1,960	0.08%
Finnish	1,695	0.07%
Khmer language	1,690	0.06%
Nepali	1,640	0.06%
Albanian	1,585	0.06%
Burmese	1,560	0.06%
Azerbaijani	1,475	0.06%
Norwegian	1,440	0.06%
Kannada	1,430	0.05%
Armenian	1,385	0.05%
Irish	1,360	0.05%
Pampangan language	1,310	0.05%
Lao	1,175	0.05%
Bisayan languages	1,145	0.04%
Yoruba	1,130	0.04%
Akan language	1,015	0.04%
Total responses	2,607,010	98.64%
Total population	2,642,825	100%

=== Mother tongue ===
The following figures come from the 2021 census profile for Vancouver, the census metropolitan area.

Population by mother tongue (Vancouver CMA)
Identified languages with 10,000+ speakers	Population	%
English	1,340,995	51.2
English + non-official language	117,335	4.5
Mandarin	191,475	7.3
Cantonese	182,910	7.0
Panjabi (Punjabi)	180,355	6.9
Tagalog (Filipino)	67,790	2.6
Persian (incl. Dari, Farsi)	54,350	2.0
Korean	52,525	2.0
Spanish	36,625	1.5
Hindi	27,990	1.0
Vietnamese	26,850	1.0
French	24,710	0.9
Russian	20,685	0.8
Portuguese	18,185	0.7
Arabic	18,130	0.7
German	18,090	0.7
Japanese	17,340	0.7
Serbo-Croatian (Bosnian, Croatian, Serbian, Montenegrin)	13,295	0.5
Italian	13,285	0.5
Minnan Chinese (e.g. Hokkien, Teochew)	11,195	0.4
Polish	10,645	0.4
Urdu	10,495	0.4

Notes:

- The figures for Cantonese, Mandarin and Minnan do not include 1,125 speakers of "Chinese (not otherwise specified)", some of whom may speak Cantonese, Mandarin or Minnan. The total number of speakers of all varieties of Chinese is 393,030 (15.0% of the population).
- For the separate figures of Hindi and Urdu, see Hindi–Urdu controversy.
- The number of native speakers of both English and French only is 8,240, and with a non-official language as well, 2,190. This means the self-identified mother-tongue speakers of both official languages amount to 10,430 (0.4% of the population).
- The 2021 census identified 1,800 individuals who had knowledge of an indigenous language of Canada.

== Religion ==
Religion in Metro Vancouver (2021)
1. Irreligious (47.1%)
2. Christian (33.1%)
3. Sikh (8.50%)
4. Muslim (4.20%)
5. Buddhist (2.70%)
6. Hindu (2.60%)
7. Jewish (0.80%)
8. Other faiths (1.00%)

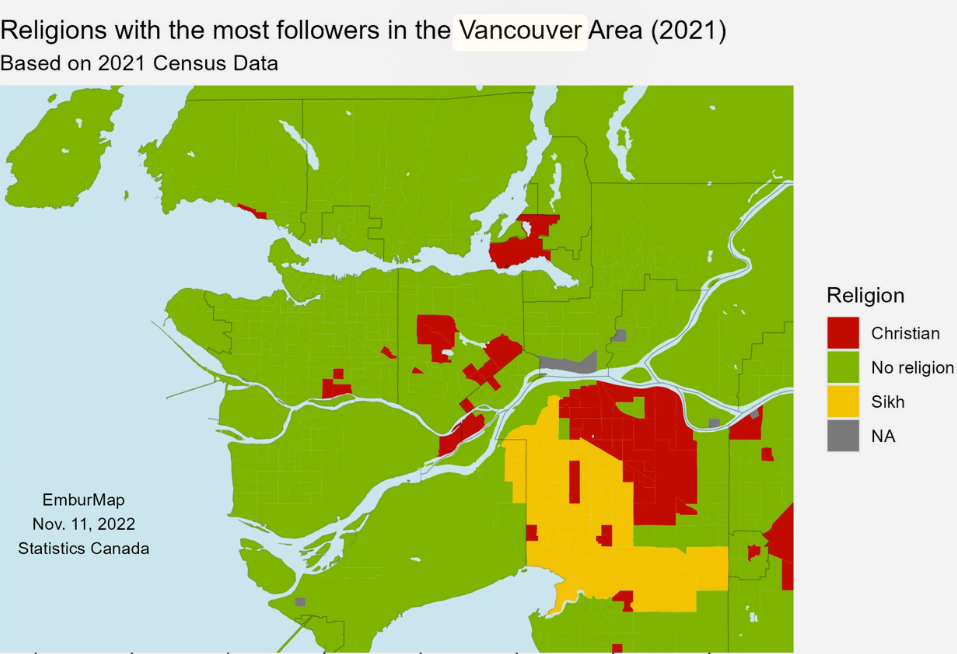
Religious affiliation with the most followers by census tract as of the 2021 census

Largest non-Christian religion in Metro Vancouver by census tract based on the 2021 census

Vancouver, like the rest of British Columbia, has a low rate of church attendance compared with the rest of the continent and a plurality (47.1 percent) of the population does not practice religion. As of the 2021 Canadian census, 33.1 percent of Greater Vancouver is Christian, the largest percentage of any religion. 13.7 percent are Catholic, 8.7 percent are Christians of unspecified denomination, 7.2 percent are Protestant, 1.4 percent are Christian Orthodox, and 2.2 percent are other Christian or Christian-related traditions. Greater Vancouver has a notable Sikh (8.5 percent) and Buddhist (2.7 percent) population, mostly adherents of South Asian and East Asian ancestry. There is also a significant minority of Muslim residents (4.2 percent).

Religious groups in Metro Vancouver (1981–2021)
Religious group	2021		2011		2001		1991		1981	
Religious group	Pop.	%	Pop.	%	Pop.	%	Pop.	%	Pop.	%
Irreligion	1,227,760	47.09%	945,405	41.45%	692,765	35.21%	493,220	31.14%	283,965	22.71%
Christianity	863,055	33.11%	950,170	41.66%	992,115	50.43%	949,530	59.94%	899,615	71.93%
Sikhism	222,160	8.52%	155,945	6.84%	99,000	5.03%	49,625	3.13%	22,390	1.79%
Islam	110,645	4.24%	73,215	3.21%	52,590	2.67%	23,335	1.47%	10,885	0.87%
Buddhism	70,670	2.71%	78,465	3.44%	74,550	3.79%	31,645	2%	8,310	0.66%
Hinduism	66,530	2.55%	40,030	1.76%	27,410	1.39%	14,880	0.94%	6,865	0.55%
Judaism	20,125	0.77%	18,730	0.82%	17,270	0.88%	14,360	0.91%	12,865	1.03%
Indigenous spirituality	1,865	0.07%	1,550	0.07%	—N/a	—N/a	—N/a	—N/a	—N/a	—N/a
Other	24,205	0.93%	17,185	0.75%	11,775	0.6%	7,520	0.47%	2,950	0.24%
Total responses	2,607,010	98.64%	2,280,695	98.59%	1,967,480	99.02%	1,584,115	98.85%	1,250,605	98.61%
Total population	2,642,825	100%	2,313,328	100%	1,986,965	100%	1,602,502	100%	1,268,183	100%

== Immigration ==
The 2021 census reported that immigrants (individuals born outside Canada) comprise 1,089,185 persons or 41.8 percent of the total population of Metro Vancouver.

Immigrants in Metro Vancouver by country of birth (1911–2021)
Country of birth	2021 census		2016 census		2011 census		2006 census		2001 census		1996 census		1981 census		1941 census		1921 census (Note: Combined population of the Burrard, Fraser Valley, New Westminster, Vancouver Centre and Vancouver South census divisions, which is the closest approximation to the geographical extent of the contemporary Metro Vancouver Area, per the 1921 census available data.)		1911 census (Note: Combined population of the New Westminster and Vancouver City districts, which is the closest approximation to the geographical extent of the contemporary Metro Vancouver Area, per the 1911 census available data.)	
Country of birth	Pop.	%	Pop.	%	Pop.	%	Pop.	%	Pop.	%	Pop.	%	Pop.	%	Pop.	%	Pop.	%	Pop.	%
China	204,825	18.8%	188,970	19.1%	159,200	17.4%	137,245	16.5%	101,770	13.8%	72,915	11.5%	16,820	4.5%	6,065	4.4%	10,060	8%	6,591	6.6%
India	151,405	13.9%	125,640	12.7%	111,265	12.2%	90,090	10.8%	67,825	9.2%	53,470	8.4%	20,440	5.5%	842	0.6%	940	0.7%	1,947	1.9%
Philippines	109,405	10%	96,680	9.8%	87,945	9.6%	62,960	7.6%	46,215	6.3%	34,640	5.5%	10,620	2.9%	—N/a	—N/a	—N/a	—N/a	5 (Note: All individuals born in the East Indies)	0%
Hong Kong	76,115	7%	71,720	7.2%	72,230	7.9%	75,775	9.1%	85,985	11.6%	86,210	13.6%	17,975	4.8%	—N/a	—N/a	—N/a	—N/a	—N/a	—N/a
United Kingdom	51,440	4.7%	56,530	5.7%	61,255	6.7%	63,940	7.7%	69,110	9.4%	75,410	11.9%	99,875	26.8%	83,006	60.6%	73,827	58.9%	48,200	48%
Iran	43,245	4%	35,250	3.6%	28,470	3.1%	21,615	2.6%	17,620	2.4%	10,060	1.6%	2,850	0.8%	—N/a	—N/a	—N/a	—N/a	—N/a	—N/a
South Korea	42,090	3.9%	36,860	3.7%	34,365	3.8%	30,990	3.7%	20,730	2.8%	12,695	2%	2,995	0.8%	—N/a	—N/a	—N/a	—N/a	—N/a	—N/a
Taiwan	38,670	3.6%	37,430	3.8%	40,725	4.5%	40,805	4.9%	43,755	5.9%	29,330	4.6%	16,450	4.4%	—N/a	—N/a	—N/a	—N/a	—N/a	—N/a
United States	27,615	2.5%	26,450	2.7%	26,240	2.9%	24,775	3%	23,070	3.1%	22,685	3.6%	24,845	6.7%	13,891	10.1%	15,074	12%	17,671	17.6%
Vietnam	27,170	2.5%	24,025	2.4%	22,930	2.5%	22,950	2.8%	22,140	3%	16,995	2.7%	3,870	1%	—N/a	—N/a	—N/a	—N/a	—N/a	—N/a
Japan	11,565	1.1%	10,675	1.1%	10,295	1.1%	8,855	1.1%	7,610	1%	6,515	1%	4,335	1.2%	3,652	2.7%	6,332	5%	4,541	4.5%
Germany	11,545	1.1%	13,520	1.4%	14,210	1.6%	15,685	1.9%	17,370	2.4%	17,780	2.8%	22,775 (Note: Including Austria)	6.1%	2,018	1.5%	812	0.6%	2,231	2.2%
Pakistan	11,125	1%	9,220	0.9%	7,765	0.9%	7,460	0.9%	4,890	0.7%	3,045	0.5%	695	0.2%	—N/a	—N/a	—N/a	—N/a	—N/a	—N/a
Mexico	10,060	0.9%	7,850	0.8%	6,540	0.7%	4,650	0.6%	3,785	0.5%	2,015	0.3%	—N/a	—N/a	—N/a	—N/a	—N/a	—N/a	—N/a	—N/a
Russia	9,350	0.9%	8,460	0.9%	6,815	0.7%	5,770	0.7%	3,735	0.5%	2,200	0.3%	7,080 (Note: All individuals born in the Soviet Union)	1.9%	2,494	1.8%	779	0.6%	892	0.9%
Poland	9,210	0.8%	10,480	1.1%	10,010	1.1%	11,030	1.3%	11,550	1.6%	12,445	2%	7,175	1.9%	1,791	1.3%	345	0.3%	—N/a	—N/a
Italy	9,090	0.8%	10,395	1.1%	10,995	1.2%	12,405	1.5%	13,155	1.8%	13,500	2.1%	14,835	4%	1,697	1.2%	1,418	1.1%	2,865	2.9%
South Africa	9,005	0.8%	8,200	0.8%	8,030	0.9%	8,240	1%	7,835	1.1%	5,755	0.9%	3,670	1%	296	0.2%	313	0.2%	202	0.2%
Malaysia	7,975	0.7%	7,515	0.8%	7,455	0.8%	7,565	0.9%	6,975	0.9%	6,575	1%	—N/a	—N/a	—N/a	—N/a	—N/a	—N/a	—N/a	—N/a
Romania	7,235	0.7%	7,110	0.7%	6,430	0.7%	5,685	0.7%	4,795	0.6%	3,575	0.6%	1,300	0.3%	353	0.3%	102	0.1%	116 (Note: Including Bukovina and Bulgaria)	0.1%
Total immigrants	1,089,185	41.8%	989,545	40.8%	913,310	40%	831,265	39.6%	738,550	37.5%	633,740	34.9%	372,010	29.7%	136,921	39%	125,412	49.8%	100,354	55.9%
Total responses	2,607,015	98.6%	2,426,235	98.5%	2,280,695	98.6%	2,097,965	99.1%	1,967,475	99%	1,813,935	99%	1,250,610	98.6%	351,491	100%	251,731	100%	179,581	100%
Total population	2,642,825	100%	2,463,431	100%	2,313,328	100%	2,116,581	100%	1,986,965	100%	1,831,665	100%	1,268,183	100%	351,491	100%	251,731	100%	179,581	100%

=== Recent immigration ===
The 2021 Canadian census counted a total of 154,820 people who immigrated to Metro Vancouver between 2016 and 2021.

Recent immigrants to Metro Vancouver by country of birth (2016 to 2021)
Country of birth	Population	% recent immigrants
India	30,545	19.7%
China	28,970	18.7%
Philippines	15,090	9.7%
South Korea	6,125	4%
Iran	5,615	3.6%
United States	5,460	3.5%
Brazil	4,625	3%
United Kingdom	4,555	2.9%
Syria	3,380	2.2%
Mexico	2,460	1.6%
Hong Kong	2,385	1.5%
Vietnam	2,275	1.5%
Ireland	2,105	1.4%
Pakistan	1,850	1.2%
Russia	1,740	1.1%
Taiwan	1,650	1.1%
Japan	1,610	1%
Ukraine	1,585	1%
Iraq	1,435	0.9%
Eritrea	1,415	0.9%
Total	154,820	100%

== Homelessness ==
As of 2023, roughly 2,422 people in Vancouver are homeless.
