= Residential segregation in Greater Vancouver =

Ethnic segregation in and near Vancouver, Canada

Visible minorities have become highly concentrated in Vancouver and its suburbs. The proportion of visible minorities in Vancouver increased from 14 percent to 55 percent of the population between 1981 and 2021. Vancouver has less residential segregation of its ethnic minorities compared to older Canadian cities such as Montreal. However, Vancouver exhibits some residential segregation, as demographic data shows visible minority concentrations vary by neighbourhood in Vancouver. In general, East Vancouver has higher visible minority concentrations than the West Side. Higher visible minority concentrations are also found in nearby suburbs such as Richmond, Surrey, Burnaby, and New Westminster. Most recent immigrants choose to locate in peripheral neighbourhoods in Greater Vancouver. It is speculated that Canada's multiculturalism policies may have prevented greater segregation from the dominant groups in both the residential location and the labour market.

== Causes ==
Segregation may have both voluntary and involuntary causes, so residential segregation is not necessarily due to racism. Since a large number of visible minorities in Vancouver are recent immigrants and from non-Western countries, sense of ethnic identity, languages and custom make immigrants to voluntarily choose to live in racially segregated neighbourhoods. Immigrant settlement patterns in Canada are closely related to circumstances in the housing market, but immigrants vary significantly in terms of their socioeconomic status and housing conditions. Housing affordability segregates people in different socioeconomic class. Housing affordability segregates different racial groups as well since visible minorities, both Canadian-born and foreign-born, have lower earnings than the white population. Hence, less visible minorities concentration in affluent Vancouver neighbourhoods such as Point Grey, Kitsilano or even affluent suburbs such as West Vancouver, whereas higher visible minority concentrations found in East Vancouver and nearby suburbs such as Richmond, Surrey, Burnaby and New Westminster, where housing price is lower comparing to Vancouver Westside. Immigrants are more likely to commute on public transit than the Canadian born, and that they commute from a more geographically dispersed area, so more visible minority immigrant groups live in North, East and Central Vancouver, Surrey and New Westminster, concentrated near routes serviced by the Sky Train and Sea Bus system.

== Chinese-Canadians ==
Chinese immigrants first immigrated to Vancouver during the 1850s owing to railway labour opportunities, coal mining and a gold rush. These early Chinese immigrants formed their own enclaves and Chinatowns in Vancouver and New Westminster because of the Sinophobia of the host society and their lack of knowledge of the English language. In the early years, Chinatown represented otherness, and was associated with crime, unleashed sexuality, opium dens, gambling, filth, run-down housing and mysterious back-alleys. Vancouver Chinatown is undergoing a period of adjustment due to a rapid rise in property assessments and taxes, and its boundaries are becoming increasingly indistinct. Chinatown's function is changing from a residential segregated racial enclave to a tourism destination and historical site. Unlike the early Chinese immigrants, recent Chinese immigrants belong to wealthier socio-economic classes and have better educational qualifications and occupational skills, so they have more options in choosing neighbourhoods in which to settle and some of them immediately settle in wealthier areas of the city. Although Chinese immigrants concentrate more in east Vancouver, Richmond and Burnaby, some live in affluent non-racial enclaves such as Point Grey.

== South Asians ==
Research found South Asian groups are the second most segregated racial groups in Canada. Many South Asians cluster throughout the city of Surrey, North Delta and in South Vancouver, in the Sunset neighbourhood, where Vancouver's Little India (Punjabi Market) is located. The Edmonds and Queensborough neighbourhoods of Burnaby and New Westminster also feature large South Asian enclaves.

Similar to recent Chinese immigrants, recent immigrants from the Indian subcontinent belong to higher socioeconomic classes than earlier immigrants and may have more options in choosing neighbourhoods in which to settle. In the case of South Asians, while residential segregation has not changed much in the recent decade, occupational segregation has decreased substantially, so more South Asians are able to choose to live in non-racial enclaves due to place of work and housing affordability.

== Indigenous peoples ==
The Aboriginal population was less urbanised and relatively few lived in Vancouver. There are 11 indigenous nations located within Metro Vancouver, and most of the First Nation people live in First Nation Reserves. The indigenous nations located within Metro Vancouver are Katzie First Nation, Kwantlen First Nation, Kwikwetlem First Nation, Matsqui First Nation, Musqueam First Nation, New Westminster Indian Band, Semiahmoo First Nation, Squamish Nation, Tsawwassen First Nation and Tsleil-Waututh Nation.

== Black People ==
Black segregation within Greater Vancouver is an overlooked aspect worthy of study, often obscured by the city's celebration of multiculturalism and diversity. This segregation has deep historical roots, dating back to at least 1928 and included as late as 1965 with clauses in Vancouver real estate deeds stating "That the Grantee or his heirs, administrators, executor, successors or assigns will not sell to, agree to sell to, rent to, lease to, or permit or allow to occupy, the said lands and premises, or any part thereof, any person of the Chinese, Japanese or other Asiatic race or to any Indian or Negro." These clauses prohibited Black individuals from residing in certain affluent Western Vancouver neighbourhoods like Shaughnessy, Kerrisdale, and Point Grey, where white residents aimed to maintain racial homogeneity. As a result, Black residents were frequently confined to neighbourhoods with lower property values and limited resources, perpetuating patterns of segregation and socio-economic inequality. This systemic discrimination resulted in the heavy concentration of Black residents in some neighbourhoods in major urban centres in Canada such as Little Burgundy in Montreal. Those of Black people who chose to stay within Vancouver found themselves in marginalized areas, particularly in the eastern region of Vancouver, due to systematic barriers that restricted their access to better opportunities. One prominent example is Hogan's Alley where Black communities formed in response to these discriminatory practices. Described as an area of poor moral and physical health by urban planners, the neighbourhood actually functioned as a nurturing environment for Vancouver's Black community, until its destruction in the 1960s.
