= Indians in Canada =

Indians in Canada may refer to:

- Indian Canadians, Canadians of Indian descent
- First Nations in Canada, indigenous peoples in Canada
