= Canadians in India =

Ethnic group in India

Regions with significant populations
- Chennai · Kolkata · Mumbai · New Delhi · Hyderabad · Amritsar · Ahmedabad · Bangalore · Visakhapatnam

Languages
- English · French · Indian languages

Religion
- Sikhism · Hinduism · Islam · Christianity · Jainism · Buddhism

Related ethnic groups
- Indo-Canadians

There is a significant community of Canadians in India, consisting largely but not exclusively of Canadians of Indian descent.

== Migration history ==
=== World War II ===
During World War II, Canadian Forces were involved in the war in the Far East. By the end of 1942, there were at least 1,100 Canadians in India and Ceylon although the exact number was not known as there was no coordinating Canadian authority. In 1943-44, the British Fourteenth Army turned the tide in northern Burma and eastern India in a series of hard-fought battles, and many individual Canadians fought with the British army and air force during these operations.

=== Post-Independence ===
In recent years, India has witnessed a serious return migration with the return of more than 100,000 people of Indian descent from across the world to India to become part of the booming Indian economy. The Indian government is targeting young Indian professionals across the globe because they are "professionally adept" and can straddle the two economies better. The Indian government encourages the second and the third generation of Indo-Canadians to come to India "voluntarily". To encourage the youth and young professionals, the Indian government has put in place several programs like "Know India" for them to experience the country.

During the 1996-2006 period, less than one percent of Indian immigrants to Canada left Canada, one of the lowest rates of any group in Canada. This is primarily because many Indian extended families are now located more in Canada than India, reducing the need to move back to take care of elders, etc. As well, economic prospects were, until quite recently, much better in Canada.

In addition to immigrants and expatriates, more and more Canadian companies are now eyeing the mounting investment opportunities in India. From eight percent in 2005, the percentage of Canadian companies showing interest in India has gone up to more than 13 percent in 2010. As of January 2011, there are around 250 small and big Canadian companies operating in India.

== Notable people ==
- Neeru Bajwa - actress
- Rubina Bajwa - actress
- Ruby Bhatia - actress
- Nora Fatehi - actress
- Amrit Kaur - actress
- Jonita Gandhi - singer
- Akshay Kumar - Bollywood actor
- Natalie Di Luccio - singer
- Sunny Leone - Canadian born former pornographic actress and Bollywood actress
- Tony Menezes - Canadian professional soccer player
- Rishi Prabhakar - Spiritual Leader
- Lisa Ray - actress
- Kamal Sidhu - model and actress
- Shweta Subram - singer
- Shashaa Tirupati - singer
- Vandana Vishwas - singer
- William James Wanless - Canadian born surgeon, humanitarian and Presbyterian missionary
- Vanessa Webb - Canadian former professional tennis player
- Robert J. Zydenbos - Dutch-Canadian scholar who has doctorate degrees in Indian philosophy and Dravidian studies

== In film ==
- Asa Nu Maan Watna Da - a Punjabi film based on a Canadian PIO family returning and settling in India.
- Jee Aayan Nu

== See also ==
- Canada–India relations
- Canada India Foundation
- Indian Canadians
- Canadian diaspora
- Immigration to India
- Indo-Canadian organized crime
