= Rishi Prabhakar =

Indian yogi (1948–2014)

Guruji Shri Rishi Prabhakar
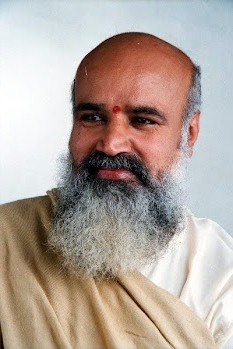
- Guruji Rishi Prabhakar
- Born: Prabhakar Raghavendra Rao; 30 August 1948; Karnataka, India
- Died: 16 February 2014 (aged 65); Bangalore, Karnataka
- Citizenship: Canadian
- Occupation: Spiritual Leader
- Years active: 40 years
- Organisation(s): Rishi Samskruti Vidya Kendra (RSVK) and other sister organisation, Founder
- Spouse: Arundhati Rishi Prabhakar
- Children: Siddhant Rishi Prabhakar
- Mother: Ramadevi
- Website: http://www.ssy.org; http://www.ssy.life

Guruji Shri Rishi Prabhakar (1948–2014) was an Indian yogi who instructed many spiritual teachers across the country. He was the founder of Rishi Samskruti Vidya Kendra, a Public Charitable Trust. He also developed many programs such as Siddha Samadhi Yoga (SSY), Kaya Kalpa Kriya (KKK), Advanced Meditation Course (AMC), Bhava Samadhi Training (BST), Hundred Percent Memory (HMP, also known as RCRT), Infant Siddha Program (ISP) and Inspirational Leadership in Rural Development (ILRD) for the well-being of humanity.

== Public life ==
Rishi Prabhakar oversaw an organisation with over 100 ashrams and 700 centres all over the world. SSY's headquarters is located at a 32-acre campus in Rishi Tapokshetra which is "a yoga finishing school of sorts for a three-day advanced course". Prabhakar's organization has a cancer research center whose goal is to eliminate cancer through yoga and healthy eating. He was recognized by the parishad of Pandits and scholors in Guntur in the year 1998 as the "Yoga Brahma" for his creation of yoga practices related to Samadhi in his unique methods. Many Yoga Gurus like Sadguru Jaggi Vasudev ji were his disciples. He was on the Board of World Religious Leaders for the Elijah Interfaith Institute.

According to RSVK's website, he was introduced to meditation through a book by Paramahansa Yogananda and he later received his spiritual training from his guru, Nada Brahma Bhagwan Visweswaraiah and Maharishi Mahesh Yogi

== Early life & education ==
Rishi was born in 1948 in Chikkaballapur, Karnataka, India and lived with his family in the city of Bangalore. He pursued his studies in aeronautical engineering at Bangalore University and further pursued his masters in management at Western Ontario University, Ottawa, Canada, on a full scholarship, where he acquired Canadian citizenship. He was also a computer scientist.

== Personal life ==
He first married in 1982 to a US citizen Maale and later got divorced. In 1999, Prabhakar married the entrepreneur Smita Ubale, later to be known as Arundhati Ma. They were married for a span of 15 years until Prabhakar's death in 2014. He and is wife had a son, Siddhant, born in 2000, who pursued his higher education at FLAME University, Pune. He is now self-employed and works for various social causes.

== Rishi Samskruti Vidya Kendra ==
Prabhakar's organisation, Rishi Samskruti Vidya Kendra (RSVK) is a registered trust under Indian Law. RSVK came into existence in 1982, with Prabhakar as a founder trustee alongside his mother and a few other individuals.

The Organisation is dedicated to the promotion of Prabhakar's knowledge, and ever since his demise, it has been looked after by a group of CORE individuals, including his family and disciples from all over India.

Jaggi Vasudev, now known as Sadhguru, learned yoga from Rishi Prabhakar, then taught it at the same organization before starting Isha Yoga.
