= Ontario Khalsa Darbar =

Gurdwara in Mississauga, Ontario

Coordinates: 43.6767°N 79.67754°W

- Dixie Gurdwara Sahib
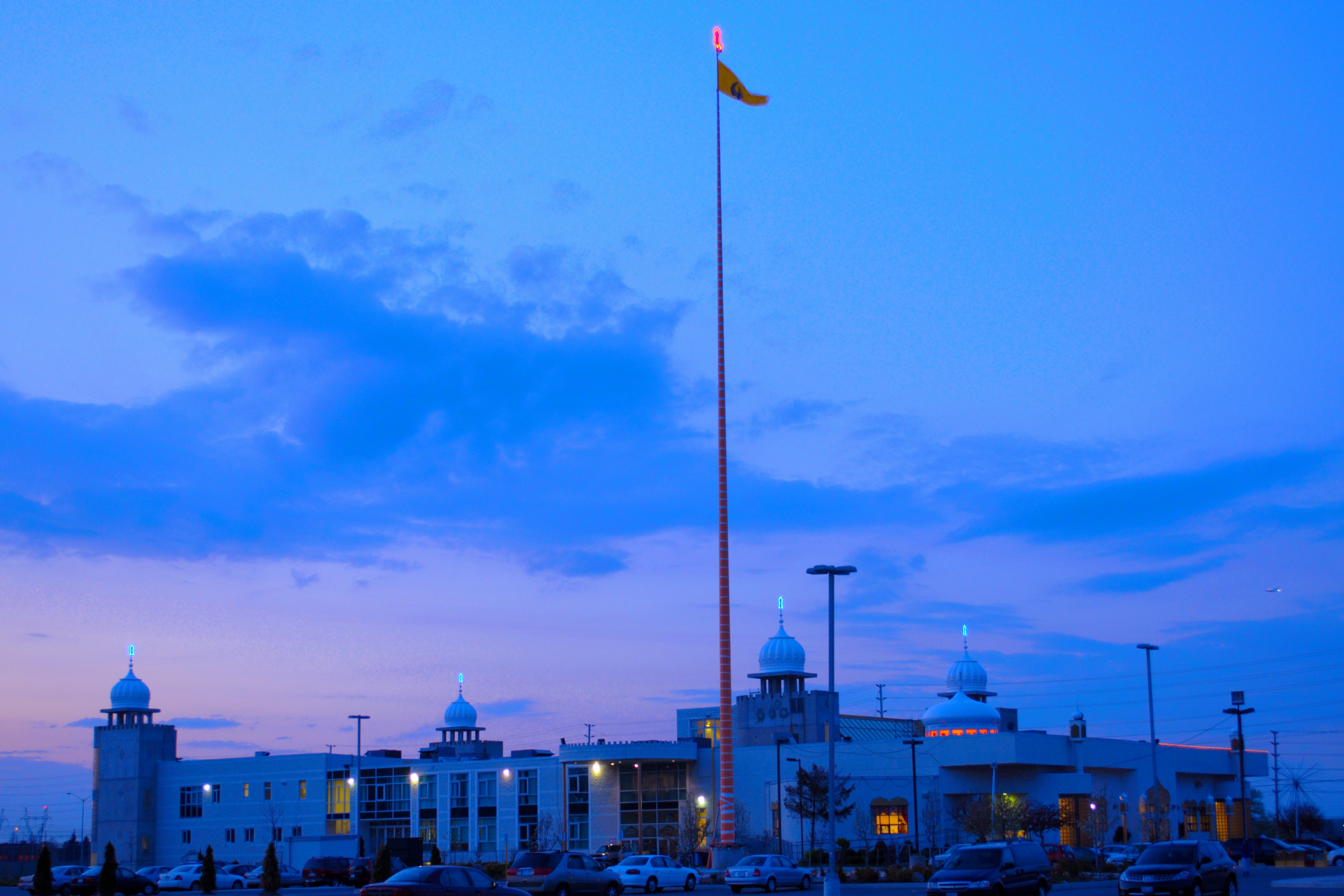
- Sikh temple in Mississauga, Ontario

Religion
- Affiliation: Sikhism
- Province: Ontario
- Leadership: Giani Bhupinder Singh (Head Granthi)
- Status: Active

Location
- Location: 7080 Dixie Rd, Mississauga, ON l5S 1B7
- Country: Canada
- Interactive map of Ontario Khalsa Darbar

Architecture
- Architect: Hardial Dhir
- Style: Sikh architecture
- Founder: Pritam Singh Chohan, Mohinder Singh, Jai Singh, Ranjit Singh Mahal, Avtar Singh Bhogal
- Established: 1978 as Ontario Khalsa Darbar, opening ceremony of new building on 25 June 1989
- Groundbreaking: 10 April 1982

Website
- dixiegurdwara.com

Ontario Khalsa Darbar, popularly referred to as Dixie Gurdwara, is a Sikh Gurdwara (place of worship) in Mississauga, Ontario. A "gurdwara" means "the doorway of the Guru" and is a Sikh place of worship. Its location is at 7080 Dixie Road, Mississauga, Ontario.

== History ==
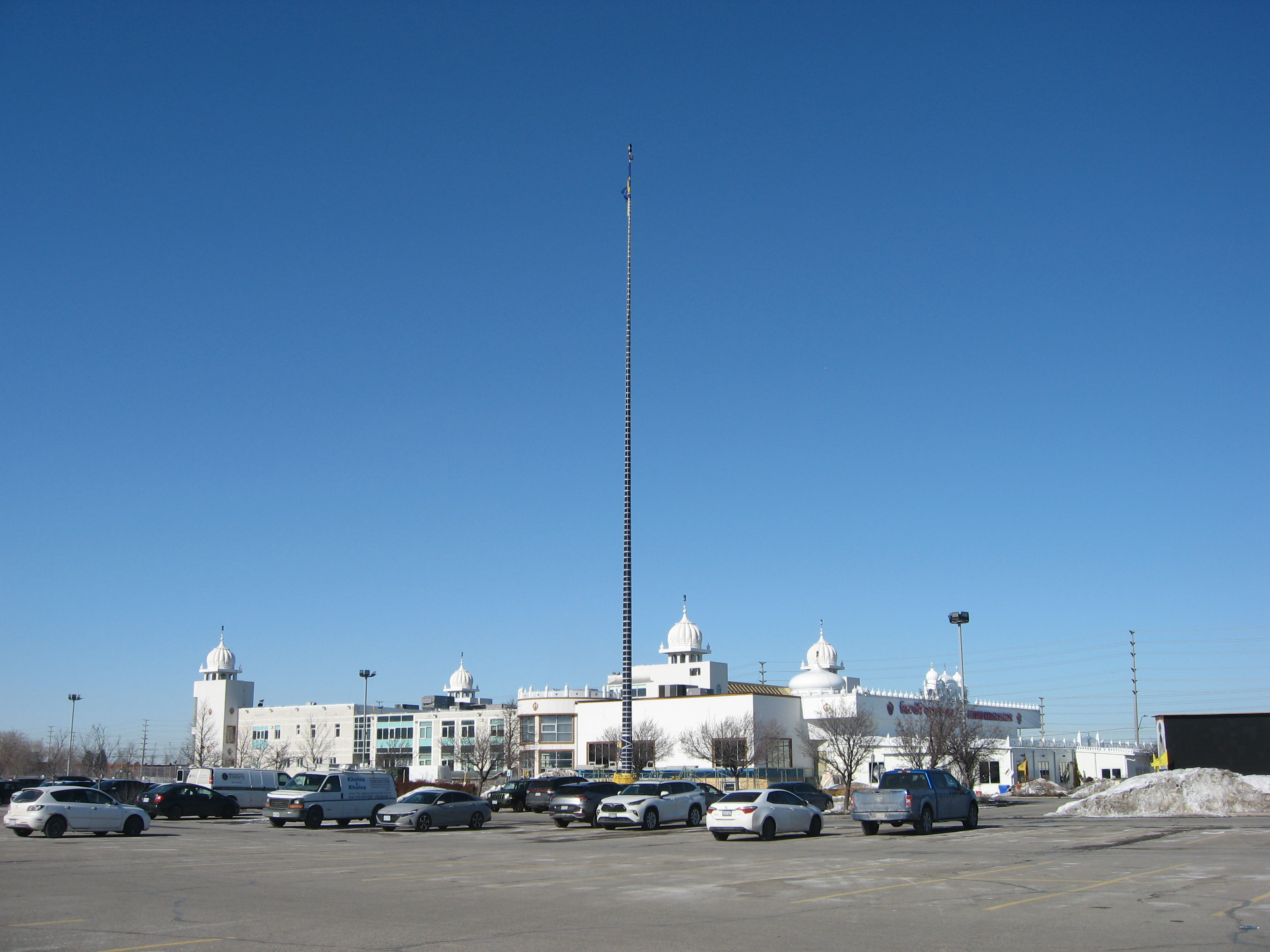
Ontario Khalsa Darbar in March 2026

In 1973, Ontario's Sikh community purchased a 1.9 acre plot of farmland in Mississauga for the intention of constructing a gurdwara there. It was officially started in 1978 in the farmhouse that stood at the property. By 1982, the gurdwara had transformed into a mobile building. On 10 April 1982, the foundation of a proper gurdwara structure was started. Steadily, more and more money was raised and land was purchased and a building was created in 1988. The 25,000 sq ft gurdwara was officially inaugurated on 25 June 1989. The opening ceremony in 1989 drew a crowd of 40. In 1993, an additional 25 acres was purchased for expansion, which was followed by an 11.5 acre purchase and expansion in 1995. By 13 July 1997, the site had been expanded by a size of 110,000 sq ft. The next year in 1998, a 135-ft tall Nishan Sahib flag was installed at the gurdwara. In 2001, the Nagar Kirtan (which celebrates Viasakhi) had a crowd of nearly 120,000 people. In 2003, a large amount of sand was excavated at the site to prepare for future expansion. In 2019, a new kitchen had been built, as was the East Hall Extension. Kiratpur Park was opened in 2022, which provides the local Sikh community a location to disperse ashes of their deceased. In 2023–24, numerous halls within the complex were refurbished and an elevator was installed. The current projects of the gurdwara are a West Hall Extension, a landscaping initiative at the intersection of Dixie and Derry, and the building of a bridge spanning Etobicoke Creek. In 2026 the extension of the West hall was completed, and a new library was completed on the first floor.

The temple has been the subject of several controversies such as a donation to the African National Congress in 1990, a dispute over whether Sikh marriages can be performed in a hotel which serves alcohol and meat, and when a Sikh priest stayed at the temple, thus defying a deportation order.

== Management committee ==
The management committee of the gurdwara consists of eleven board members. They are selected through an election which takes place every three years in March. Any individual can become part of the general body and vote in the election, and become part of the management committee.

=== Committee ===
The committee members serving from April 2025 to March 2028 are:

- Baljit Singh Pandori- Chairman
- Harpal Singh-President
- Gurinderjit Singh Bhullar- Vice-President
- Paramjit Singh Gill- General Secretary
- Sarabjit Singh- Assistant Secretary
- Bhupinder Singh Bath- Treasurer
- Navjit Singh- Assistant Treasurer
- Jaswinder Singh- Director
- Sardara Singh- Director
- Davinder Singh Dhaliwal- Director
- Gurdev Singh Nahal- Director

== Kiratpur Park ==
The management committee in 2020 had started at initiative for families to scatter ashes of their departed family members. A park was created on the site of the Etobicoke Creek behind the gurdwara, where families scatter ashes of their family members. The park was completed in July 2022.

== Blood donation camp ==
The Gurdwara alongside Canadian Blood Services organizes two blood donation camps in a year. The first being in June, in memory of operation blue star and the second being in November in honor of Guru Nanak Dev Ji's Gurpurab.

== Gallery ==
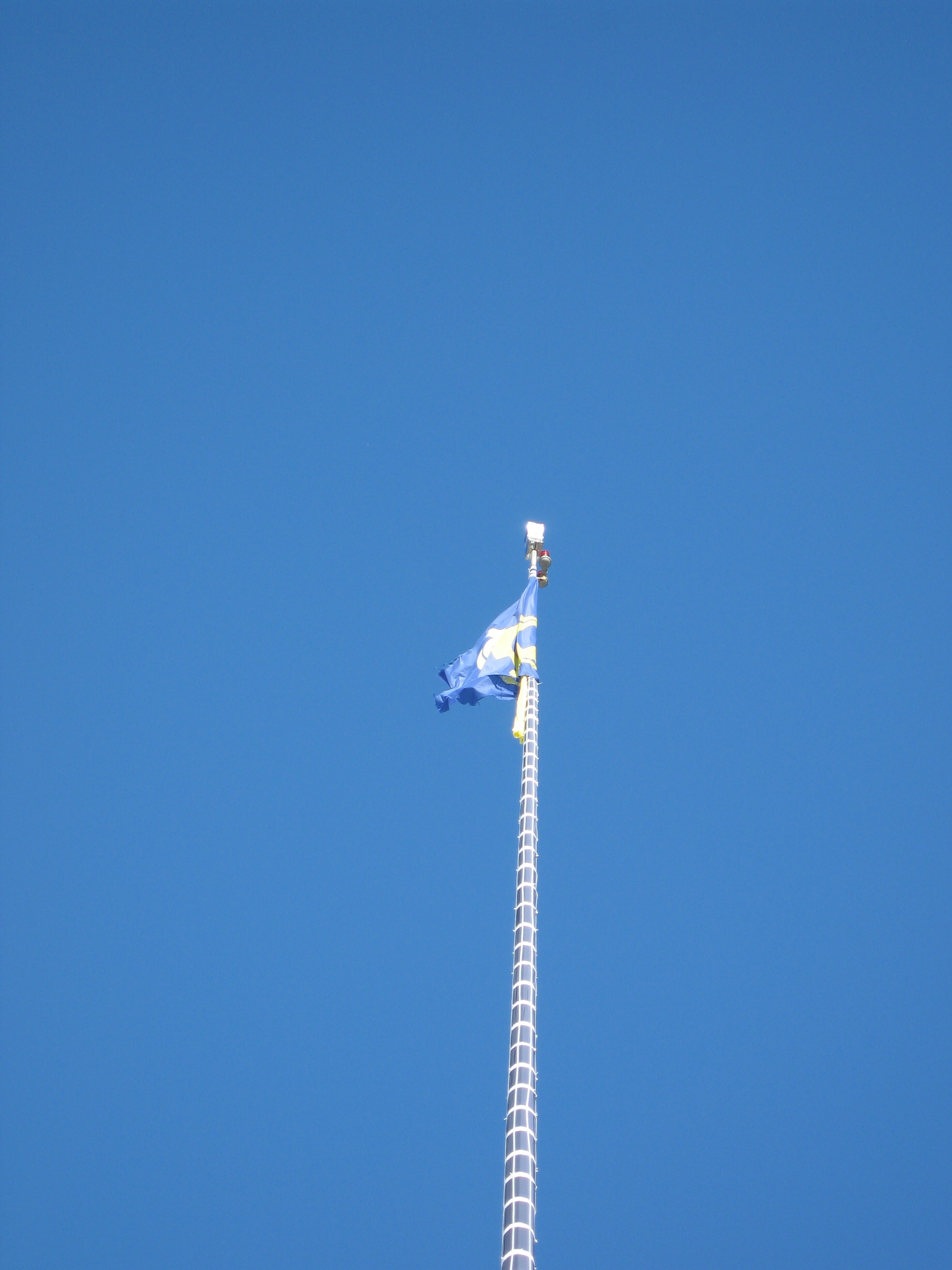
Nishan Sahib of the gurdwara

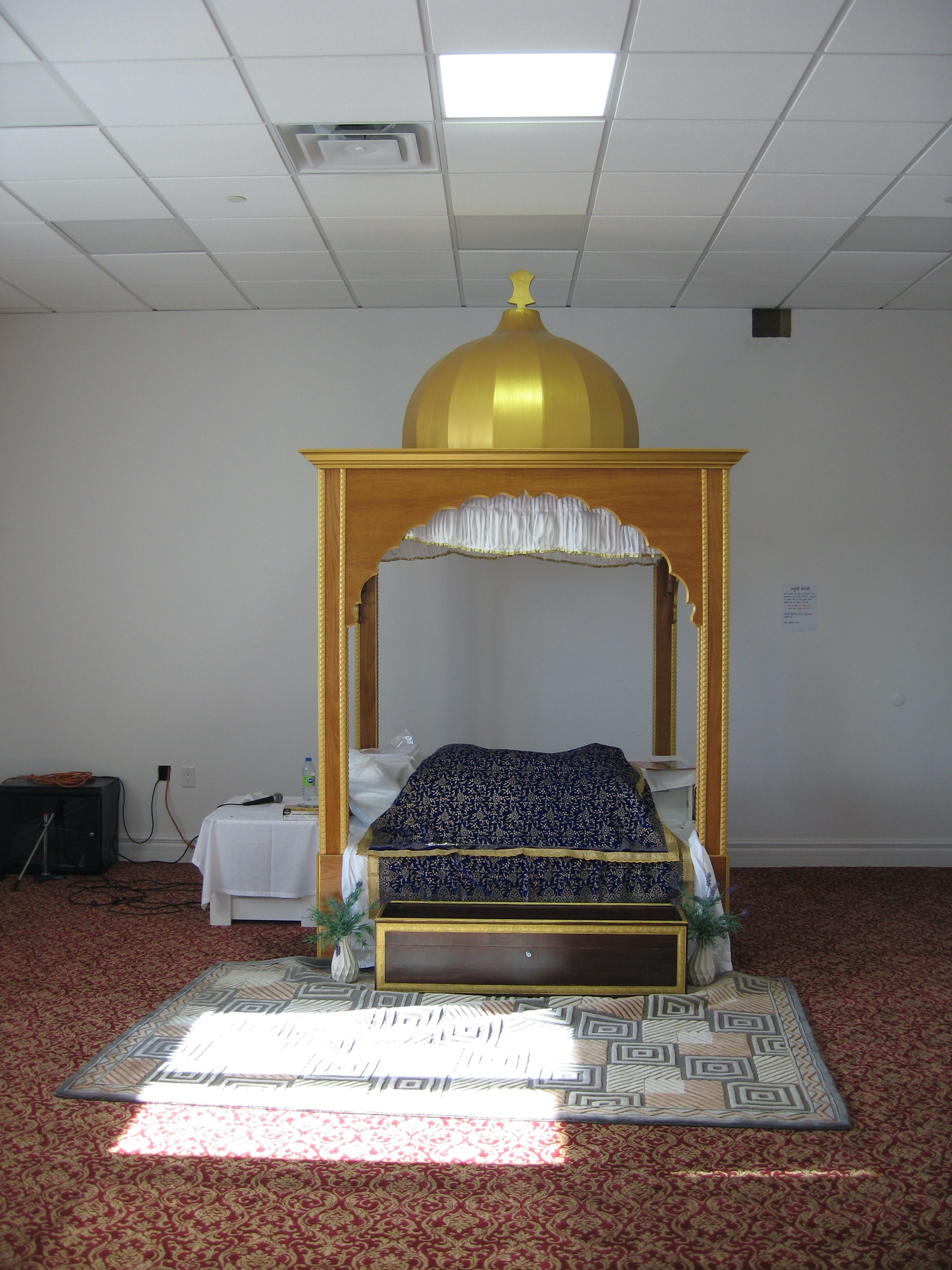
Palki Sahib where the Guru Granth Sahib is kept in parkash

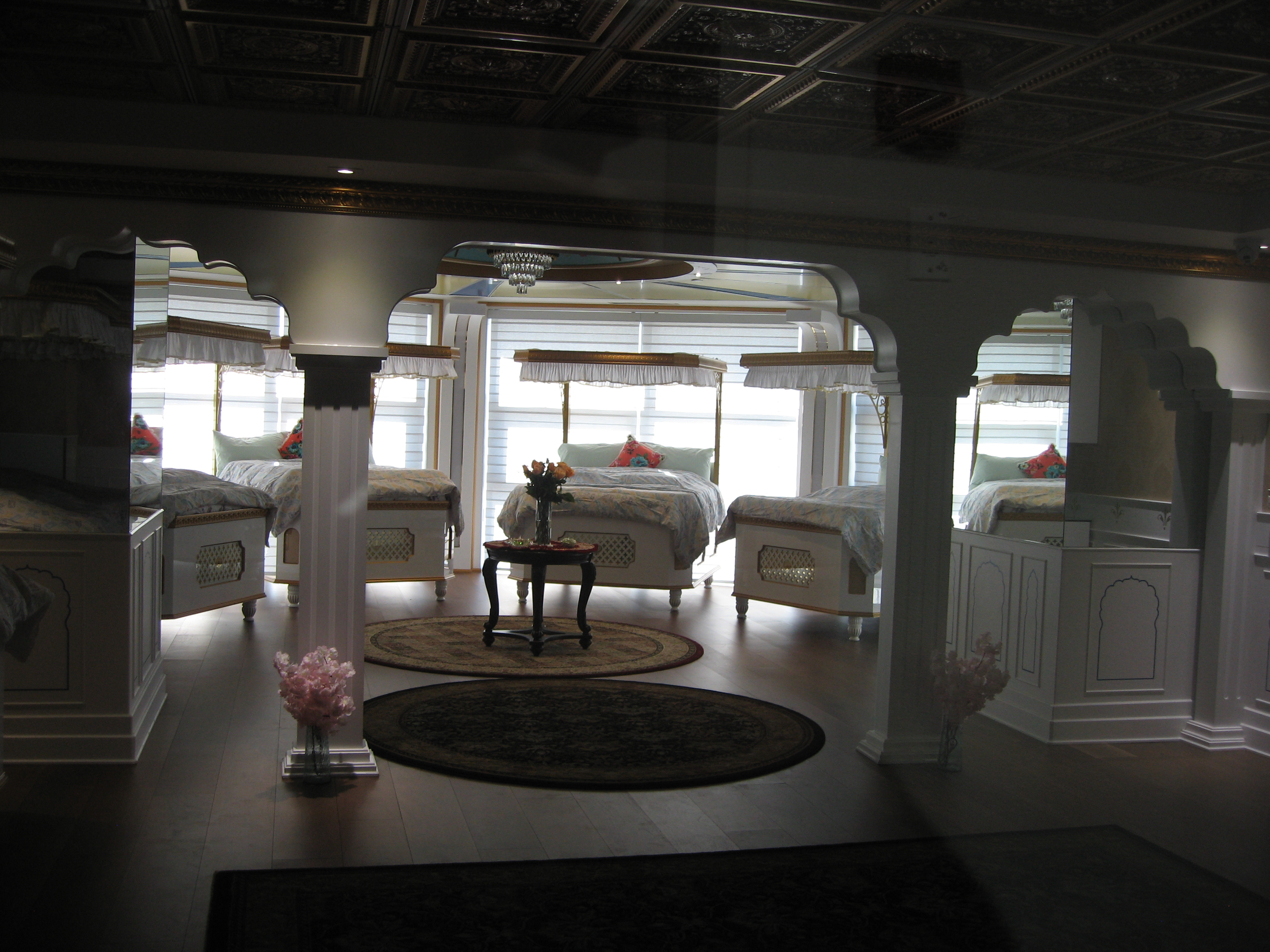
Sachkhand Sahib, room where copies of the Guru Granth Sahib are put to "rest"

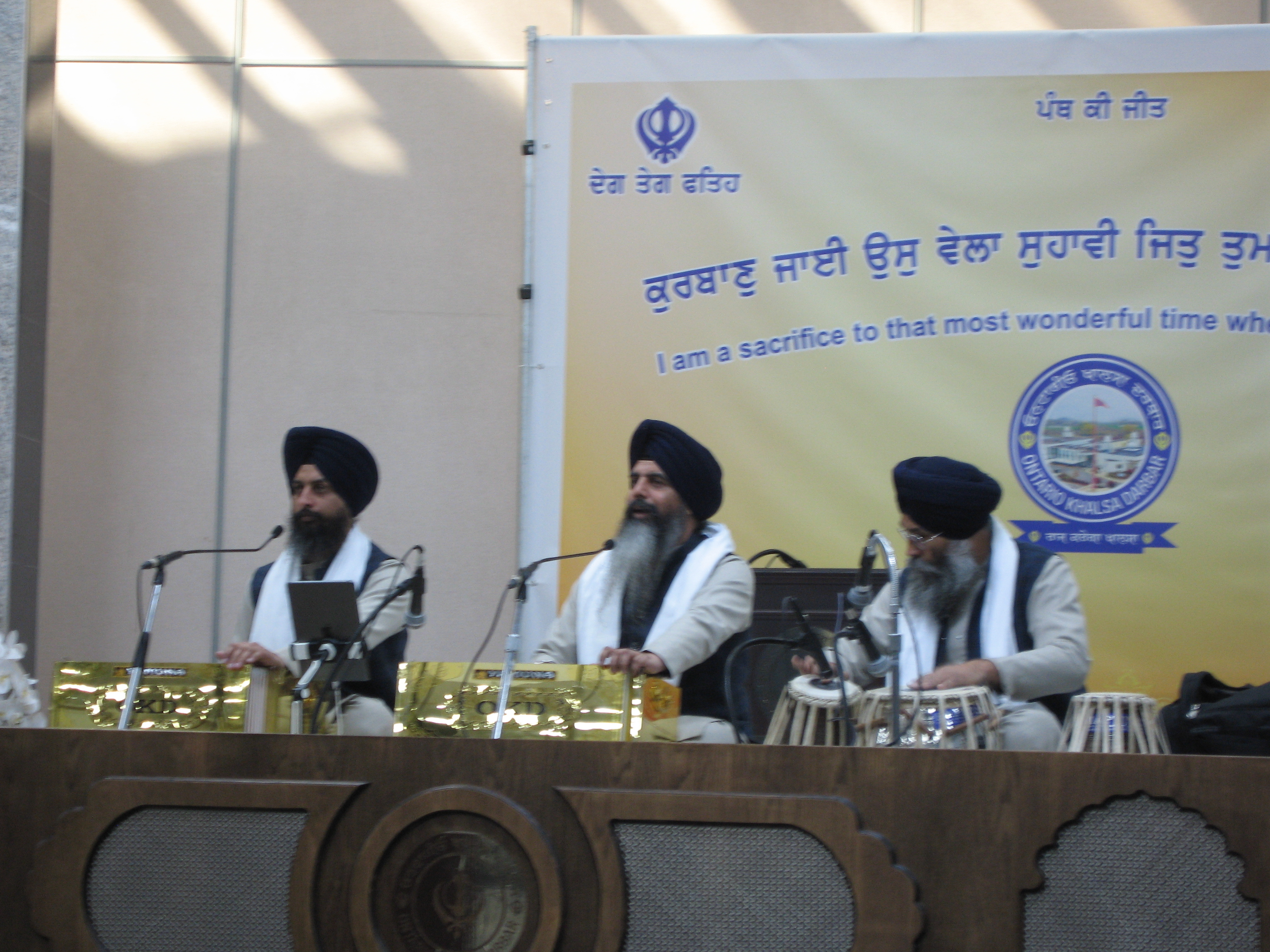
Kirtankaris performing kirtan at the site

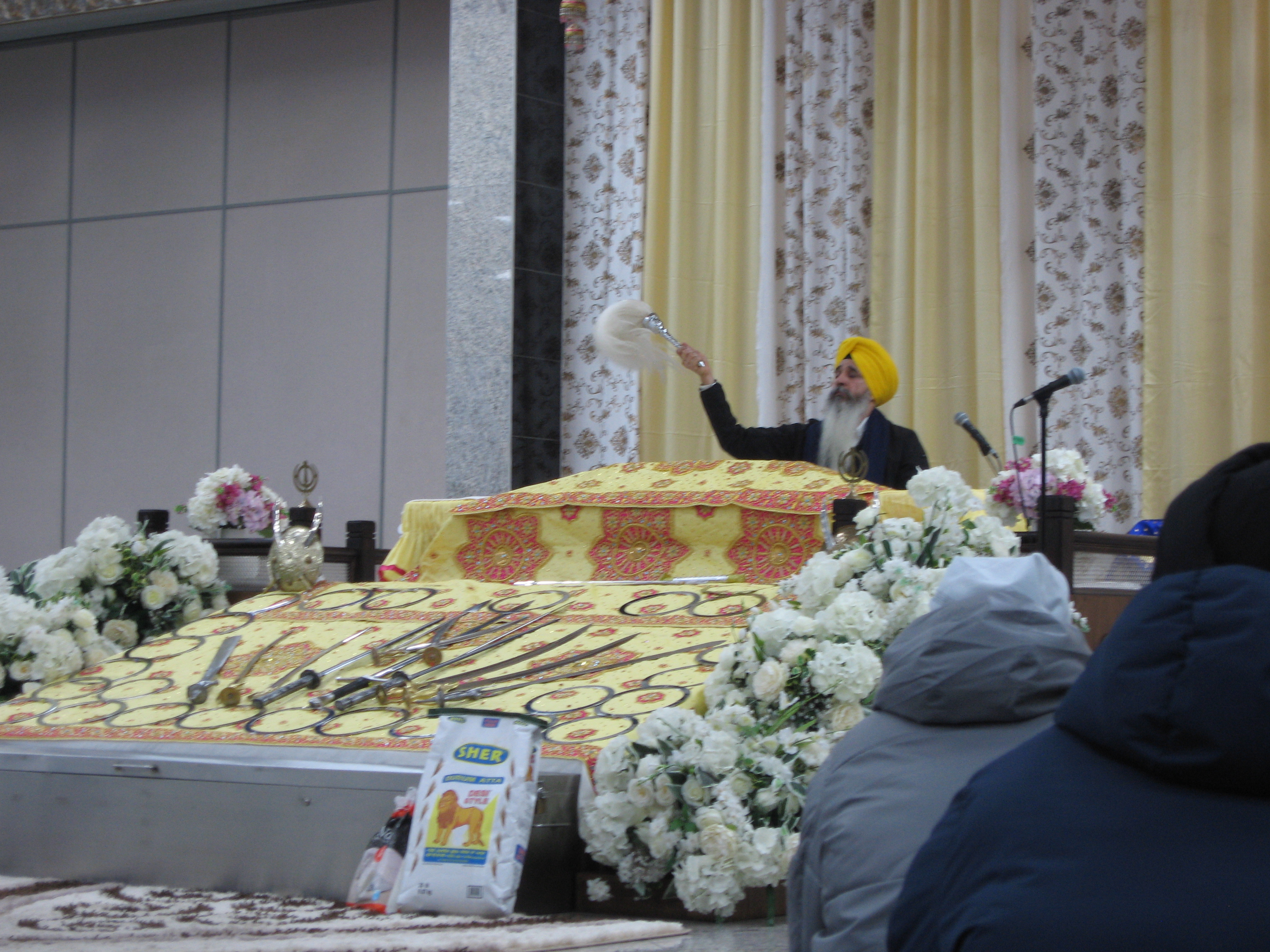
Chaur Sahib attendant waving the fly-whisk over the Guru Granth Sahib

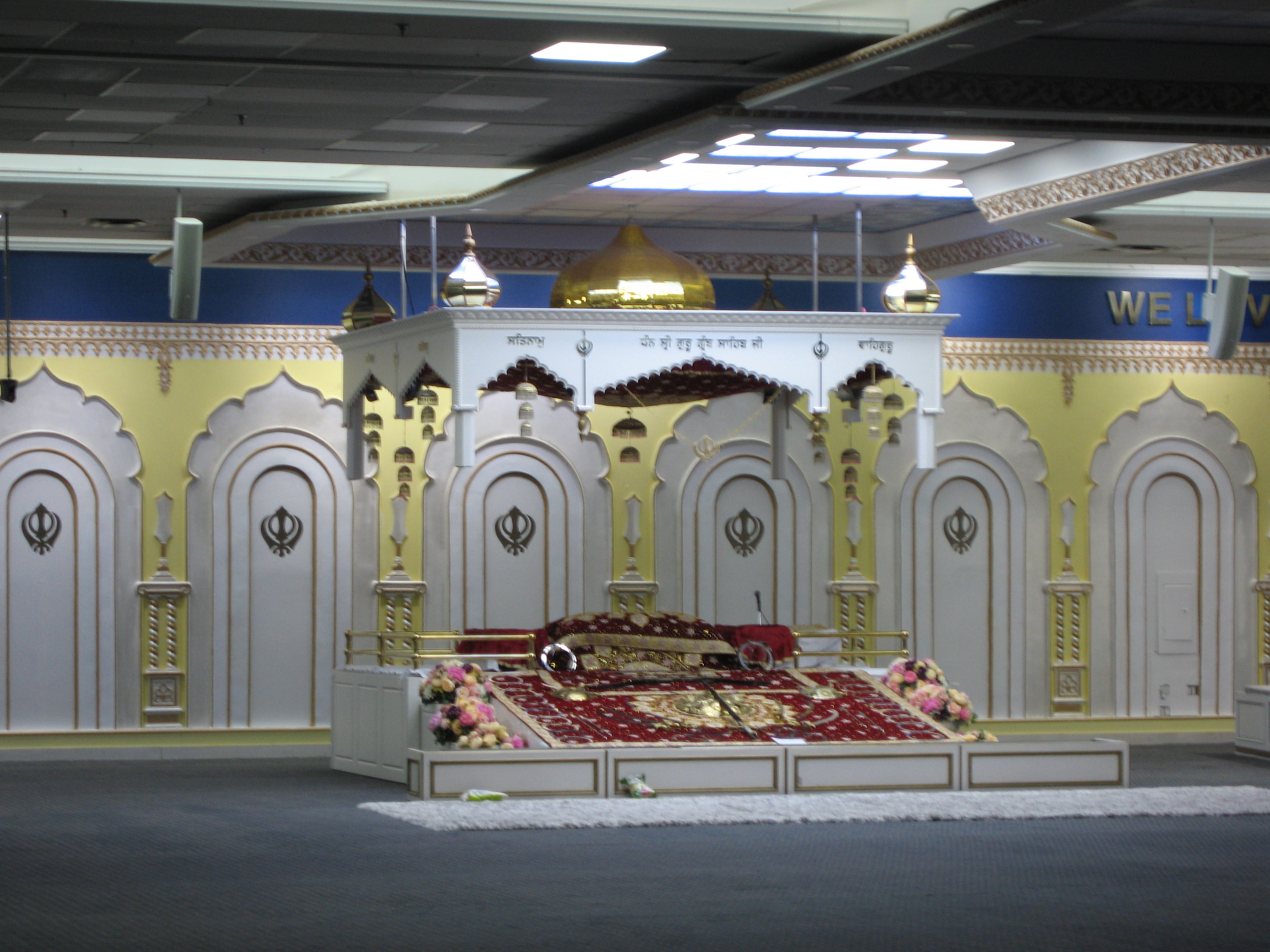
Location where the Guru Granth Sahib is placed during worship-service

== See also ==
- Sikhism in Canada
