= List of Hindu temples in Canada =

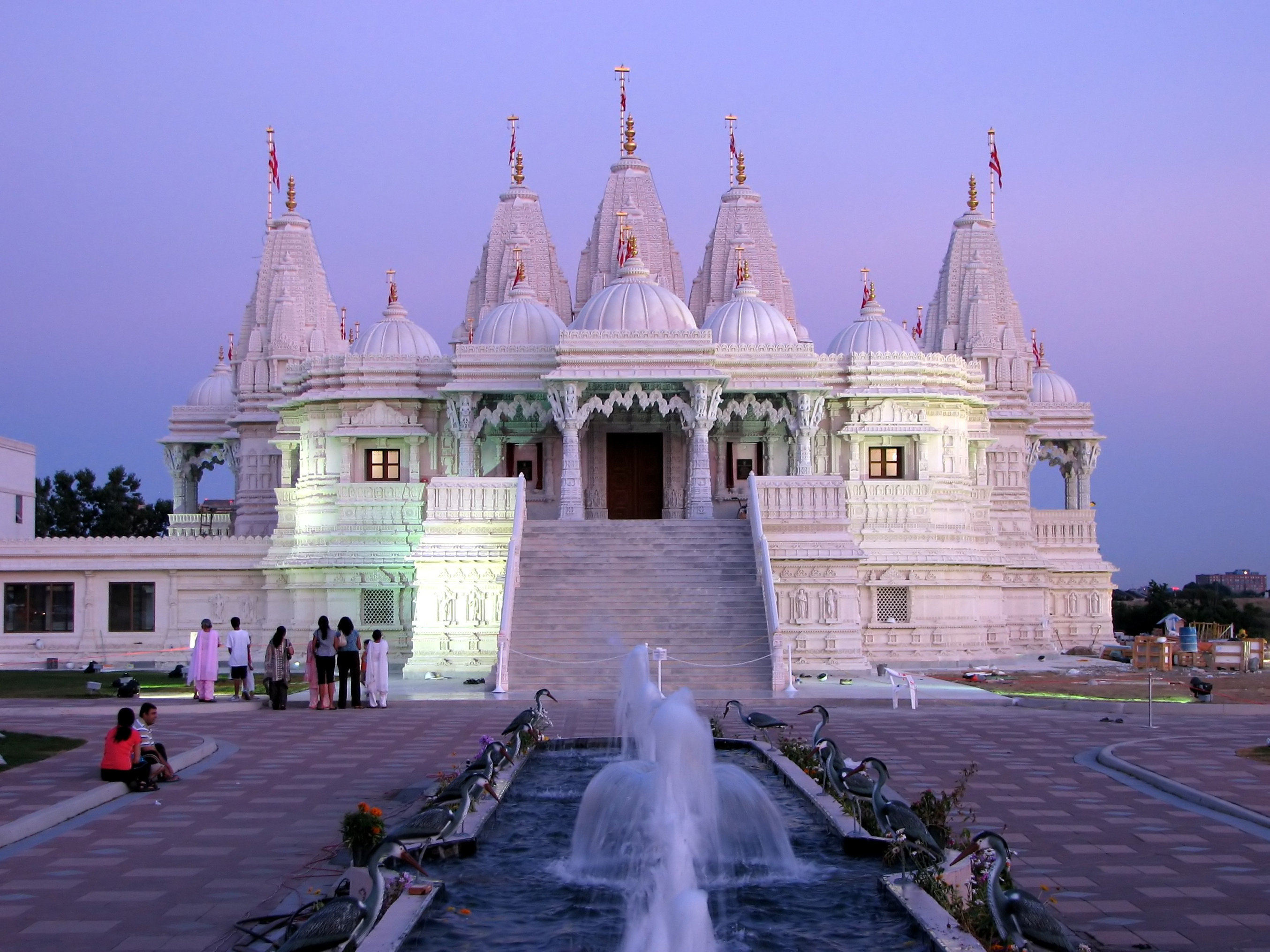
BAPS Shri Swaminarayan Mandir, Toronto.

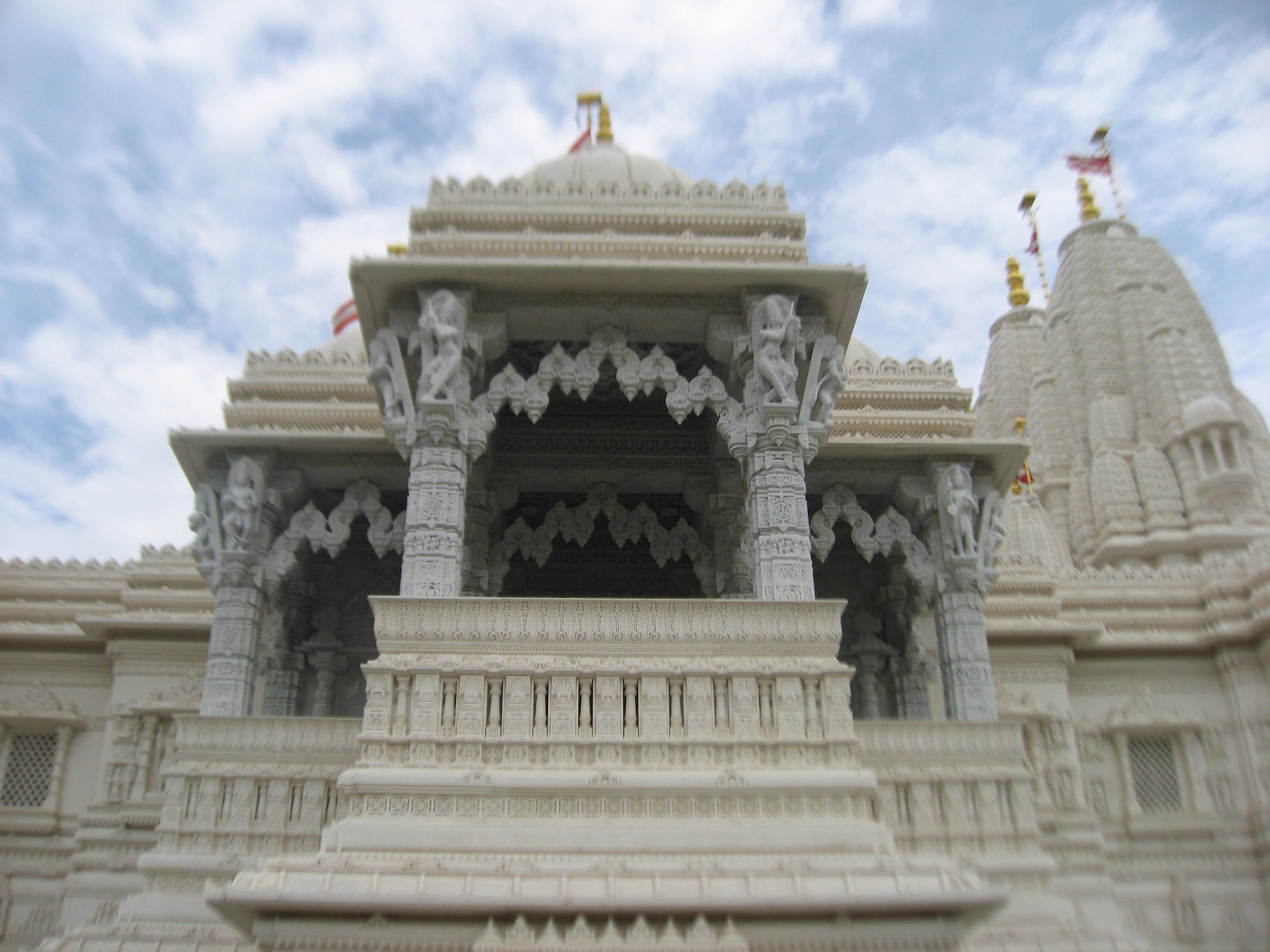

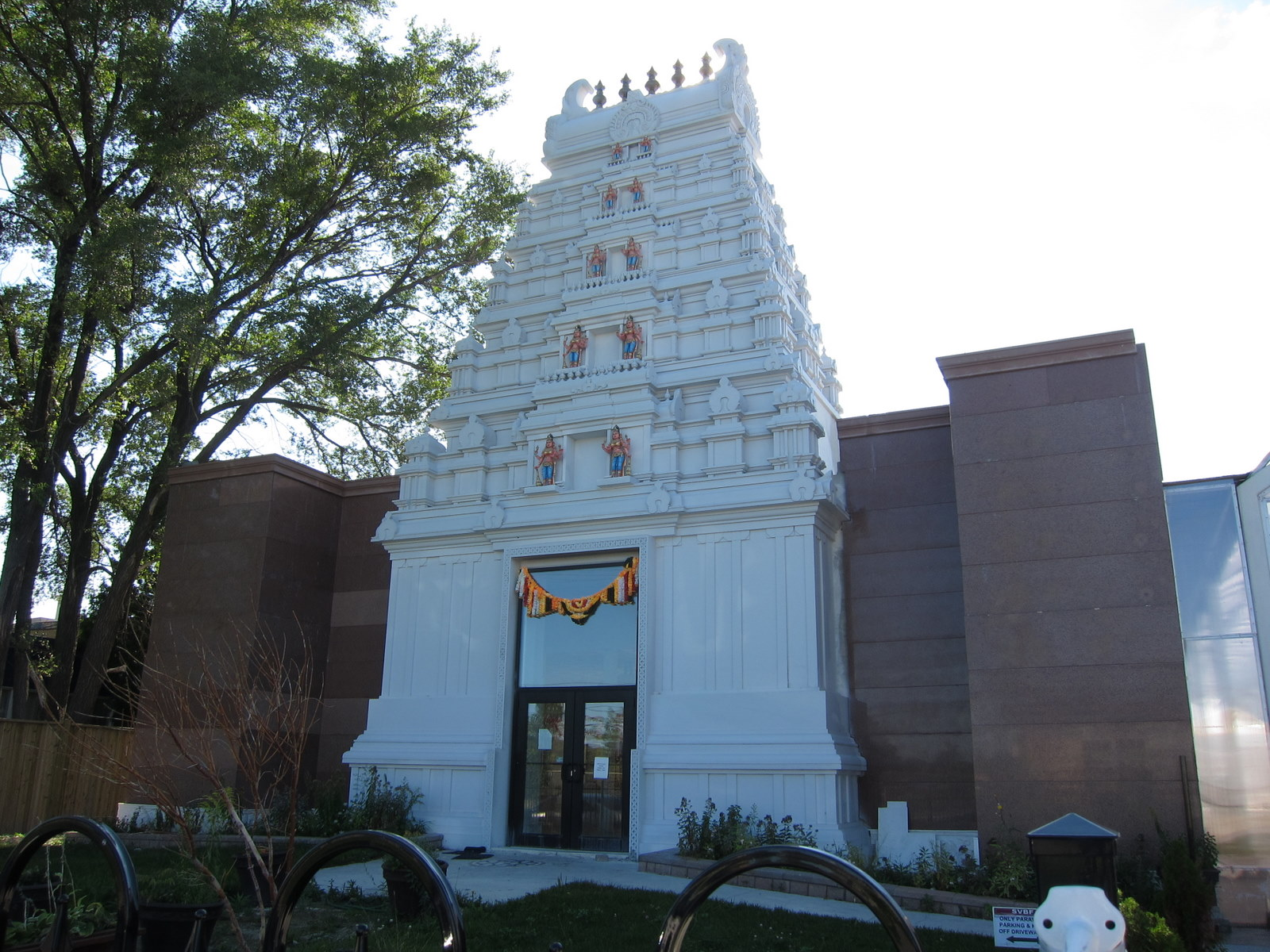
Sringeri Temple, Toronto.

This article is a list of Hindu temples and religious societies in Canada, by region.

== Ontario ==
=== Toronto ===
Name	Deity	Image	Notes
Bangladesh Canada Hindu Cultural Society			
BAPS Shri Swaminarayan Mandir Toronto	Swaminarayan Radha Krishna Sita Ram Shiva Parvati		
Hare Krishna Temple			
Toronto Thiruchendur Murugan Temple	Murugan		
Shri Swaminarayan Temple			
Sridurka Hindu Temple (North York)			
Sringeri Temple of Toronto (Etobicoke)	Saraswati		

=== Greater Toronto ===
==== Brampton ====
- Hindu Sabha Temple
- ISKCON Brampton (Hare Krishna Temple)
- Pashupatinath Temple (Nepalese Canadian Heritage Centre- NCHC)
- Guruvayurappan Temple of Brampton (GTOB) - Shri Krishna Temple
- Bharat Mata Mandir.
- Shri Gauri Shankar Mandir.
- Shiva Ganesh Mandir.
- Shiv Shakti Gyaan Cultural Sabha.
- Jagannath Temple.
- Bhavani Shankar Mandir & Cultural Centre.
- Sri Ganesha Durga Hindu Temple.
- Sri Sivasubramaniya Hindu Temple.
- Sri Katpaga Vinayagar Hindu Temple.
- Canada Sri Sabari Peedam.
- Maa Chitpurni Temple.

==== Mississauga ====
- Hindu Heritage Centre
- Ram Mandir
- JeyaDurgha Thevasthanam
- Shri Vitthal Hindu Mandir
- Sri Siva Satyanarayana Swamy Temple
- Sri Raja Rajeswari Temple
- Toronto Kalibari

==== Scarborough ====
- Hindu Dharmasram
- Sri Radha Krishna Temple.
- Lakshmi Narayan Mandir.
- Vedic Cultural Centre.
- Valmiki Ashram.
- Nithyananda Meditation Academy.
- Vishnu Satsang Mandir.
- International Bhakti Yog Sadhana Society - Sadhana Mandir.
- Bhadra Kali Shakti Mandir.
- The Shirdi Sai Mandir and Cultural Centre.
- Sri Nagapooshani Ambika Sametha Nagalingeswara Swamy Temple.
- Sri Chandramouleeshwara Shivaalayam.
- Periya Sivan Kovil.
- Nainativu Nagammal Kovil of Canada.
- Sri Ayyappa Samajam Of Ontario.
- Canada Sri Shanmuganatha Swamy Hindu Temple.
- Canada Kanthaswamy Temple.
- Thirupathi Venkatachalapathi Temple.
- Merupuram Sri Maha Pathirakali Amman Temple.
- Sri Meenakshi Amman Society.
- Sri Aathi Parashakthi Hindu Temple.
- Sri Varasiththi Vinaayagar Hindu Temple

==== York Region ====
- Sanatan Mandir Cultural Centre — Markham
- Hindu Temple Society of Canada — Richmond Hill
- Vishnu Mandir — Richmond Hill

=== Ottawa ===
- Hindu Temple of Ottawa-Carleton
- ISKCON Ottawa
- Sri Sathya Sai Baba Centre of Ottawa
- Vishva Shakti Durga Mandir Association

=== Cornwall ===
- Cornwall Shivan Temple, Cornwall — Cornwall

=== Others ===
- Niagara Hindu Samaj Shiv Mandir — Niagara Falls
- Brantford Hindu Temple — Brantford
- Hindu Mandir Durham — Durham
- Devi Mandir — Pickering
- Canada sri ambalavana vetha vinayagar alayam — Ajax
- Sakat Mochan Hanuman Mandir — Ajax
- The Hindu Cultural Centre — London
- Hindu Samaj of Hamilton & Region — Hamilton
- Yugal Kunj - Radha Krishna Temple — Hamilton
- Vaishno Devi Temple, Oakville — Oakville
- ISKCON Milton — Milton

== Atlantic Canada ==
- Vedanta Ashram Society (Halifax, Nova Scotia).
- St. John's Hindu Temple (St. John's, Newfoundland & Labrador).
- Maritime Geeta Bhawan (Fredericton, New Brunswick)
- Hindu Temple PEI (Charlottetown, Prince Edward Island).

== Quebec ==
- Subramanya/Ayyappa Temple. (Val-Morin, Quebec)

Montreal

- Temple Shree Ramji Mandhata
- Montreal Thiru Murugan Temple
- The Hindu Temple of Quebec - 50 Kesmark St., Dollard des Ormeaux, QC, H9B 3K4
- Hindu Mission of Canada - 955 Rue de Bellechasse, Montréal, QC H2S 1Y2
- Hare Krishna Temple (ISKCON) Temple - 1626 Pie-IX Blvd, Montreal, Quebec H1V 2C5
- Montreal Arya Samaj
- Aanantha Sai Baba Temple - 7905 Av. Stuart, Montréal, QC H3N 2R9
- Sanatan Dharma Temple

== Prairies ==
=== Manitoba ===
Winnipeg

- Hindu Society of Manitoba
  - Hindu Temple and Dr. Raj Pandey Hindu Centre
  - Hindu Temple and Cultural Centre
- Manitoba Hindu Dharmik Sabha, Temple and Cultural Centre Inc.

=== Saskatchewan ===
Regina

- Hindu Samaj of Southern Saskatchewan
  - Regina Hindu Temple
- Shree Swaminarayan Hindu Temple (ISSO)
- ISKCON Regina
- Shree Swaminarayan Gurukul Rajkot Sansthan

Saskatoon

- Hindu Society Of Saskatchewan
  - Shri Lakshmi Narayan Temple
- Shree Swaminarayan Hindu Temple (ISSO)
- BAPS Shri Swaminarayan Mandir

=== Alberta ===
- Sanatan Mandir Cultural Society of Fort McMurray

==== Edmonton ====
- Fiji Sanatan Society of Alberta
- ISKCON Sri Sri Radha Govindagi Mandir
- Bhartiya Cultural Society of Alberta
- Hindu Society of Alberta
- Maha Ganapathy Temple
- Shri Sai Baba Mandir, 5706

==== Calgary ====
- BAPS Shri Swaminarayan Mandir
- Hindu Society of Calgary
- Hindu Society of North America
- ISKCON Calgary Temple (Sri Sri Radha Madhava)
- Calgary Srithevi Karumari Amman Hindu Temple
- Sri Anagha Datta Society of Calgary
  - Sri Shirdi Sai Baba Mandir
- Sangam Temple Calgary
- Sanatan Hindu Cultural Society
- Shree Swaminarayan Vadtal Gadi
- Sri Murugan Society of Alberta

== British Columbia ==
Greater Vancouver Area

- ISKCON Vancouver — Burnaby
- Lakshmi Narayan Mandir — Surrey
- Sri Ganesh Temple Society of BC — Vancouver
- Hindu Temple Burnaby — Burnaby, British Columbia

Okanagan and Vancouver Island

- Victoria Hindu Parishad and Cultural Centre — Victoria
- South Okanagan Hindu Temple — Summerland
- Vancouver Island Jagannath temple — Chemainus

== See also ==
- Hinduism in Canada
- Lists of Hindu temples
- List of Hindu temples outside India

Sri Sanatan Dharam Society - Port Alberni , BC
