= Hinduism in Canada =

Canadian Hindus

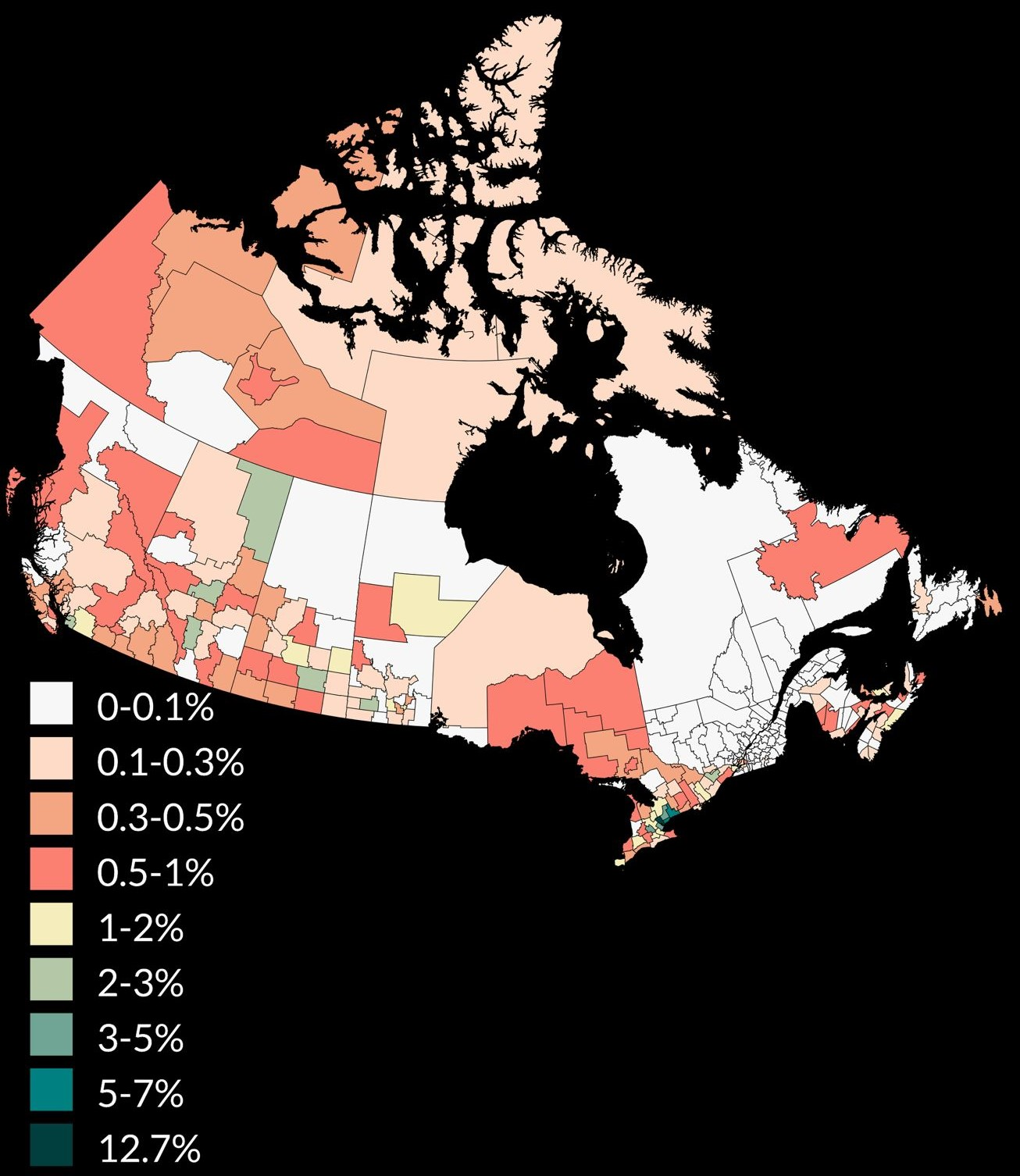
- Population distribution of Hindu Canadians by census division, 2021 census

Total population
- ▲828,195 (2021) ▲2.3% of the Canadian population

Regions with significant populations
- Ontario: 573,700
- British Columbia: 81,320
- Alberta: 78,520
- Quebec: 47,390
- Manitoba: 18,355

Languages
- Official: Canadian English; Canadian French; Home: Tamil; Hindi; Punjabi; Gujarati; Bengali; Marathi; Haryanvi; Gujari; Telugu; Nepali; Kannada; Fiji Hindi; Caribbean Hindustani; Indian Languages; Sacred: Sanskrit; Old Tamil

Hinduism is the third-largest religion in Canada, with approximately 2.3% of the nation's total population identifying as Hindu in the 2021 census. As of 2021, there were over 828,000 Hindu Canadians.

Among South Asian Canadians – the largest visible minority group in the country – approximately 30% identify as Hindu, reflecting the strong cultural and spiritual presence of the religion within this community. After the US, Canada ranks second in North America, having one of the highest populations of Hindus in the Western world.

Hinduism is one of the fastest-growing religions in Canada. According to the 2021 Census, there are 828,195 Hindus in Canada, up from 297,200 in the 2001 census. Across Canada, Hindu temples, cultural centres, and festivals such as Diwali and Holi play a central role in community life. In recognition of the contributions of the Hindu community, the Government of Canada officially designated November as Hindu Heritage Month in 2022.

== History ==
Immigration from India to Canada began in 1903-04. Although early Canadian references often labelled all Indian immigrants as 'Hindus,' Hindus formed a minority among these Punjabi arrivals, who were predominantly Sikh with some Muslims. Nevertheless, all South Asians encountered racial exclusion under Canada's colour bar. Immigrants faced intense hostility in British Columbia, leading to a sharp decline in numbers. Religious practices among early South Asian immigrants, including Hindus, centred on community gatherings at temples.

During the 1960s, mounting pressure from India led to the liberalization of Canadian immigration policies. Many Hindus from India, Pakistan, Bangladesh, Sri Lanka, Nepal, Indonesia, along with Hindu Indian diasporic communities in Mauritius, Fiji, Trinidad and Tobago, Guyana, Suriname, Malaysia, Singapore, South Africa, and East African nations such as Kenya, Uganda, and Tanzania arrived to Montreal, Toronto, Calgary and Vancouver.

Canadian Hindus have generally originated from three distinct groups. The first group is primarily made up of Indian immigrants who first began arriving in British Columbia. Hindus from all over India continue to immigrate to Canada. This initial wave of Hindu immigrants came from nations that were historically under European colonial rule, such as British Raj, Fiji, Mauritius, South Africa, Guyana, Trinidad and Tobago, Suriname, and parts of coastal East Africa. The second major group of Hindus immigrated from Bangladesh, Nepal, Bhutan, and Sri Lanka. In the case of Sri Lankan Hindus, their history in Canada goes back to the 1940s, when a few hundred Sri Lankan Tamils migrated to Canada. The 1983 communal riots and later civil war in Sri Lanka precipitated the mass exodus of Tamils with over 500,000 finding refuge in countries including Canada, the UK, Australia, United States, France and Switzerland. Since then, Sri Lankan Tamils have continued to migrate to Canada, particularly to the Greater Toronto Area. A third group includes European Canadians not from Hindu backgrounds, including followers of the Hare Krishna movement. The Toronto district of Scarborough has a particularly high concentration of followers of the Hare Krishna movement, with Hinduism being the dominant religion in several neighbourhoods.

The government pledged to resettle 6,500 Bhutanese refugees of Nepalese ethnicity by 2012. The majority of Bhutanese Nepali are Hindus. By 2014, Lethbridge was home to the largest Bhutanese community in Canada. Nearly 6,600 Bhutanese Nepali, also called Lhotshampa had settled in Canada by the end of 2015, with approximately 1,300 in Lethbridge by August 2016.

== Hindu population & demographics ==
Historical population
Year	Pop.	±%
1961	460	—
1971	9,790	+2028.3%
1981	69,505	+610.0%
1991	157,015	+125.9%
2001	297,200	+89.3%
2011	497,200	+67.3%
2021	828,195	+66.6%
1961 and 1971 are partial and based on immigration data, real figures are substantially higher.

Year	Percent	Increase
1971	0.05%	—N/a
1981	0.28%	+0.23%
1991	0.56%	+0.28%
2001	0.96%	+0.40%
2011	1.45%	+0.49%
2021	2.23%	+0.78%

=== By province ===
The Hindu population in Canada according to the 2021 National Household Survey.

Province	2001 Census		2011 Census		2021 Census	
Province	Hindus pop	Hindus %	Hindus pop	Hindus %	Hindus pop	Hindus %
Ontario	217,560	1.9%	366,720	2.9%	573,700	4.1%
British Columbia	31,495	0.8%	45,795	1.0%	81,320	1.7%
Alberta	15,965	0.5%	36,845	1.0%	78,520	1.9%
Quebec	24,525	0.3%	33,540	0.4%	47,390	0.6%
Manitoba	3,835	0.3%	7,720	0.6%	18,355	1.4%
Saskatchewan	1,590	0.2%	3,570	0.3%	14,150	1.3%
Nova Scotia	1,235	0.1%	1,850	0.2%	8,460	0.9%
New Brunswick	470	0.1%	820	0.1%	3,340	0.4%
Newfoundland and Labrador	400	0.1%	635	0.1%	1200	0.2%
Prince Edward Island	30	0.0%	205	0.1%	1,245	0.8%
Yukon	10	0.0%	165	0.5%	265	0.5%
Northwest Territories	60	0.2%	70	0.2%	200	0.5%
Nunavut	10	0.0%	30	0.1%	55	0.2%
Canada	297,200	1.0%	497,200	1.5%	828,400	2.3%

=== By major Census Metropolitan Areas (2021) ===
The Hindu population in Canada by major Census Metropolitan Areas according to the 2021 Census.

Metropolitan area	%
Toronto CMA	457,825
Metro Vancouver	66,530
Metro Montreal	45,565
Metro Calgary	34,920
Metro Edmonton	33,905
Metro Ottawa	21,205
Metro Winnipeg	14,925

=== By federal electoral district (2024) ===
The Hindu population percentage in Canada by federal electoral district according to the 2021 Census.

Ontario

Metropolitan area	%
Brampton East	23.8%
Brampton West	20.4%
Scarborough—Woburn	19.4%
Brampton South	17.1%
Scarborough—Guildwood—Rouge Park	16.2%
Brampton North—Caledon	15.3%
Mississauga—Malton	14.8%
Scarborough North	14.7%
Etobicoke North	14.3%
Markham—Thornhill	14.3%
Brampton—Chinguacousy Park	13.1%
Brampton Centre	12.5%
Mississauga Centre	12.2%
Ajax	11.6%
Markham—Stouffville	10.2%

British Columbia

Metropolitan area	%
Surrey—Newton	8.1%
Surrey Centre	7.6%
Fleetwood—Port Kells	5.2%
Vancouver South	4.5%
Delta	3.9%
Vancouver Kingsway	3.9%

Alberta

Metropolitan area	%
Edmonton Southeast	9.4%
Edmonton Mill Woods	7.3%
Edmonton Gateway	7.2%
Calgary Skyview	6.9%
Calgary McKnight	6.0%

Quebec

Metropolitan area	%
Pierrefonds—Dollard	4.8%
Papineau	3.9%
Saint-Laurent	3.8%

Manitoba

District	%
Winnipeg South	4.4%

=== By ethnic origin (2021) ===
Origin	Census
South Asian	768,785
Visible minority (no further defined)	34,545
Multiracial	8,715
White	4,385
Southeast Asian	4,150
Black	3,780
Latin American	2,815
West Asian	720
Chinese	175
Filipino	60
Arab	45
Korean	10
Total	828,195

== Temple societies ==
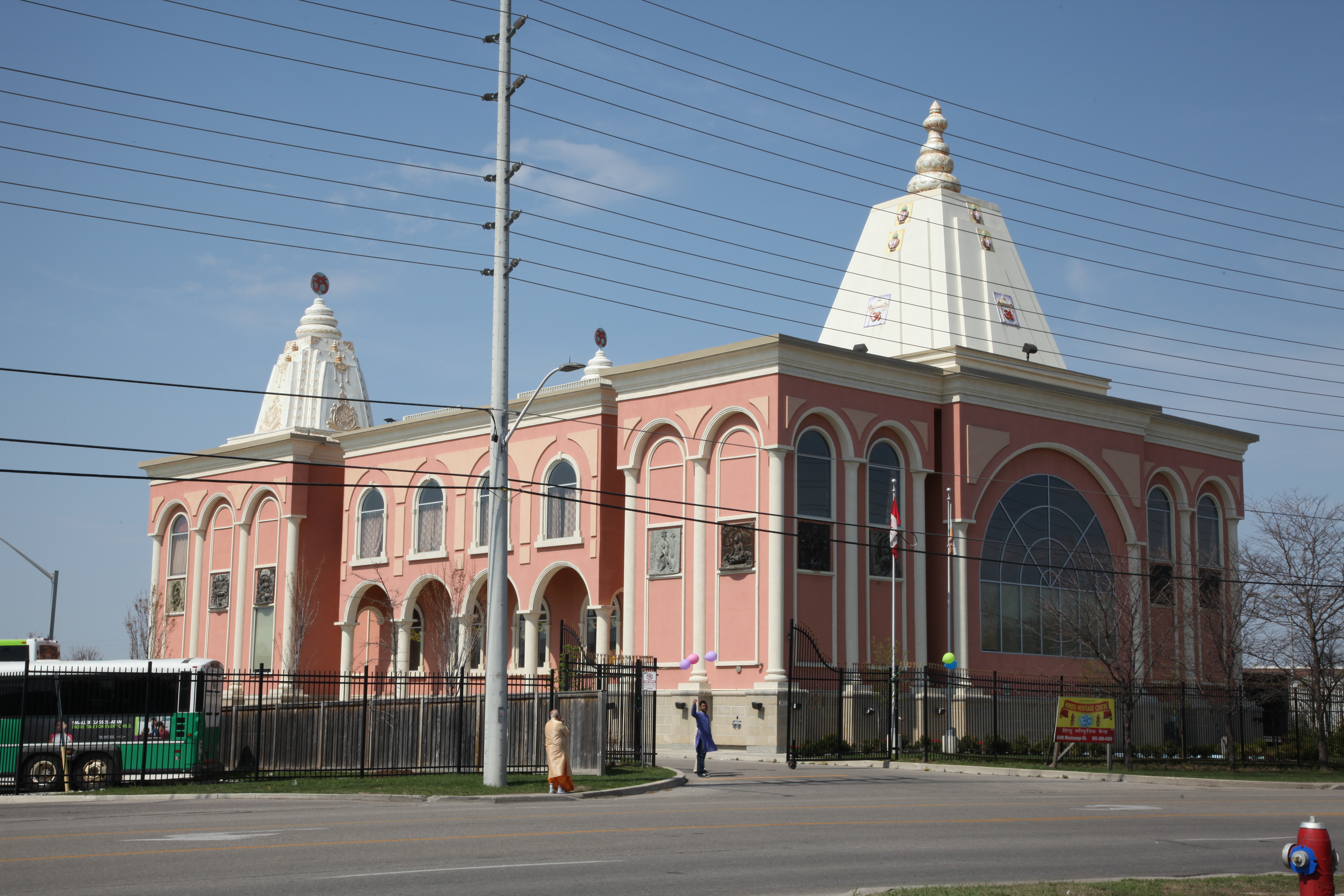
Hindu Heritage Centre in Mississauga

These communities have formed over 1000 temple societies across the country which essentially function as community organisations. Some also established private Tamil-language schools as an alternative to non-religious and Catholic school boards attended by Hindu students.

In 1967, the Hindu Sanstha of Nova Scotia, the earliest Hindu temple in Canada, was established.

In 1972, the Aulds Cove Hindu Temple was opened by families living in rural Nova Scotia.

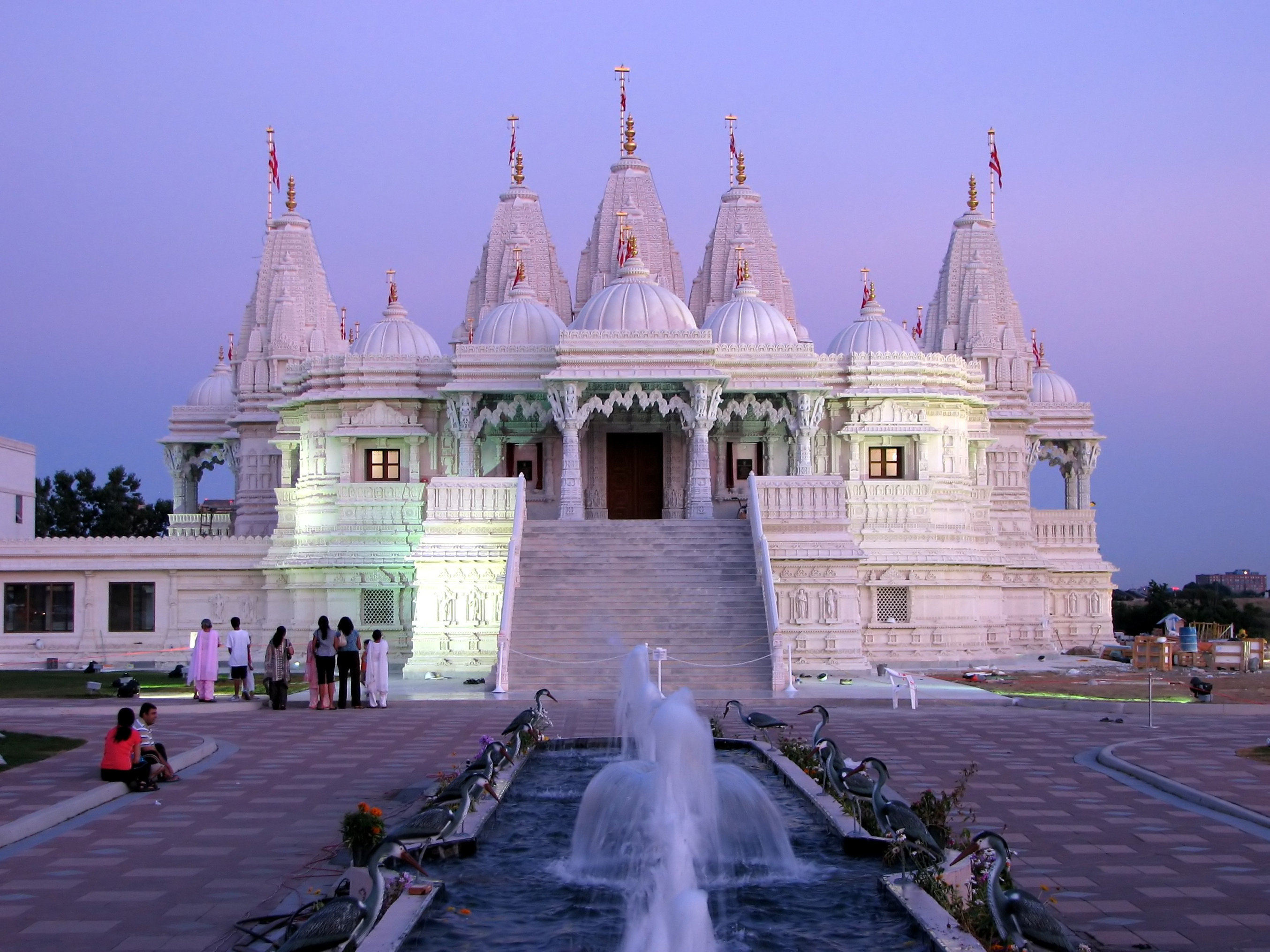
BAPS Shri Swaminarayan Mandir, Toronto

The largest Hindu temple in Canada is BAPS Shri Swaminarayan Mandir Toronto. It consists of two separate buildings: the mandir itself and the Haveli, home to a large sabha hall, several religious bookstops, a small prayer room, the country's largest Indo-Canadian museum, a water fountain and a large gymnasium. It is the only Mandir built using Hindu traditions. The temple is built in the traditional Hindu style of Shikharbaddha mandir, which is made accordingly to the principles laid out in Shilpa Shastras, sacred Hindu texts that describe the canons of traditionally architecture, and describes how the structure of a shikharbaddha mandir symbolically reflects the body of Purusha, or the Cosmic Man. It took $40 million to build and opened in 2007, surpassing Hindu Sabha Temple in nearby Brampton, which held the old record. The entire mandir is 32,000 sq ft (3,000 m^{2}).

== Society ==
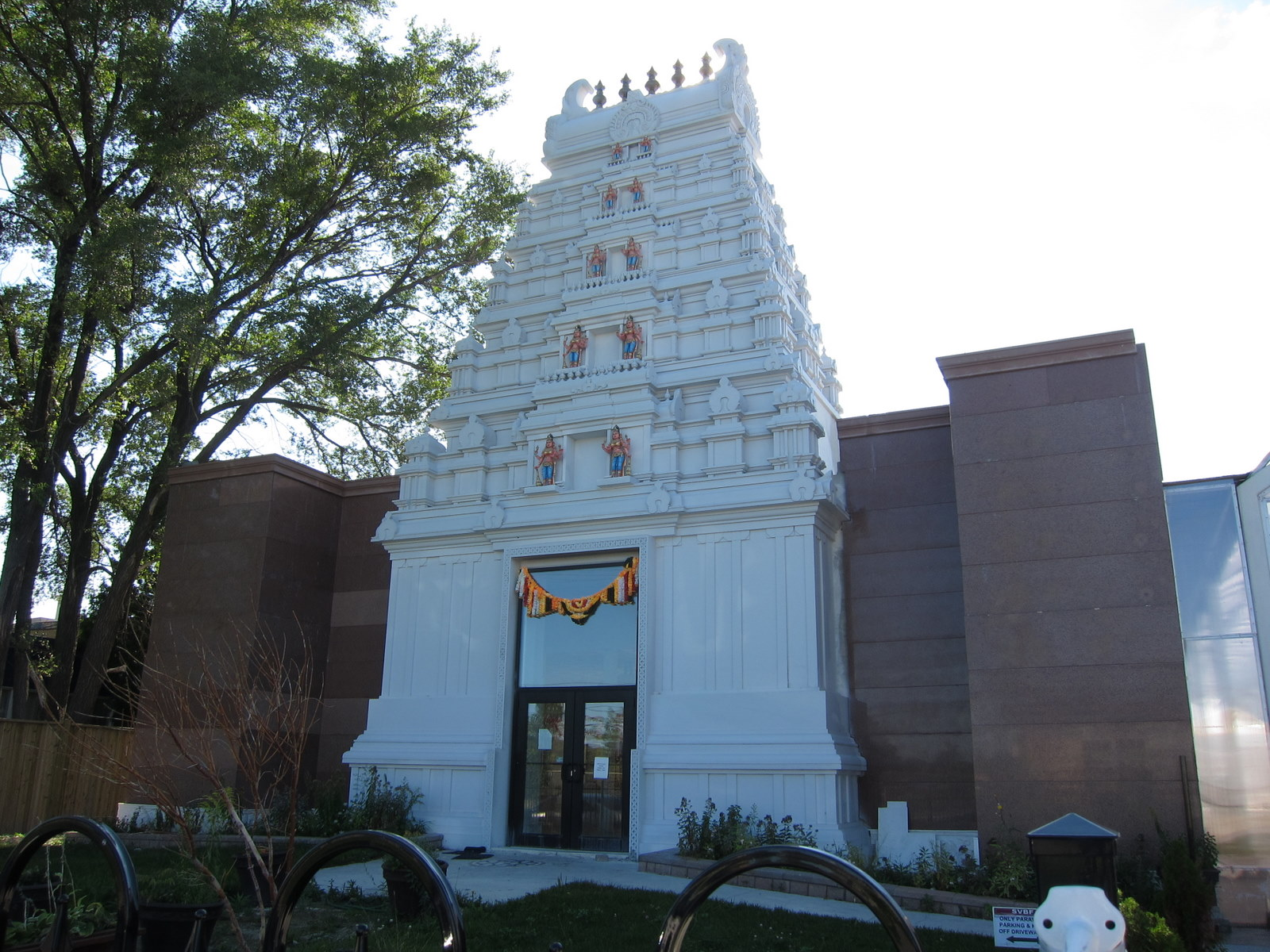
Sringeri Temple of Toronto

=== Organizations ===
There are several organizations representing the Hindu community in Canada. Hindu Canadian Foundation is one of the key organization working as a national advocacy body serving as a unifying voice for over 1 million Canadian Hindus. It focuses on political participation, youth leadership, festival organization, and defending community interests. working to Among them, the Hindu Canadian Network is the most prominent umbrella organization.

=== Contemporary society ===
According to a survey conducted by the Angus Reid Institute in 2017, 49% of Canadians had a favorable opinion of Hinduism, and 54% found it acceptable for one of their children to marry a Hindu.

Another survey by the Angus Reid Institute found that 32% of believed that the influence of Hinduism “in Canada and Canadian public life” is growing. However, 67% of those surveyed “don’t know anything/understand very little” about Hinduism, while 4% “understand very well”.

=== Community and impact ===
Hindus in Canada are able to create communities that not only follow religious practices but also provide education, counselling, support and outreach services. These communities allow many Hindus from overseas to comfortably adapt when immigrating to Canada. When Hindu institutions and worldviews are not mirrored in the migrated country, it can hinder the process of adaptation through isolation and loss of identity. Racial-ethnic identity development involves identifying with and relating to a specific group and is found to be associated with particular health behaviors and mental health outcomes.

=== Politics ===
Deepak Obhrai was the first Hindu MP in Canada. Anita Anand, Chandra Arya, Arpan Khanna, and Shuvaloy Majumdar have since been elected as MPs. Vim Kochhar was the first Hindu appointed to the Senate, Raj Sherman was the first Hindu to lead a Canadian political party. Anita Anand is the first Hindu cabinet minister in Canada. She became a cabinet minister in 2019. Despite Hindus making up 2.3% of Canada's population according to the 2021 Census, they are significantly underrepresented in federal politics, with only 1.2% of Members of Parliament (4 out of 338) elected in the 2021 federal election identifying as Hindu.

== Anti Hindu sentiment in Canada ==
Violent Sikh extremism spread to Canada following Operation Blue Star, with Canadian Sikh radicals making public pledges to kill Hindus. Former CSIS agent Bob Burgoyne stated that Sikh extremists threatened to kill thousands of Hindus by various means, including bombing Air India flights.

- In 1984, Ajaib Singh Bagri, a Canadian-Sikh man accused of playing a role in the Air India bombing, declared "Until we kill 50,000 Hindus, we will not rest" at the founding convention of the World Sikh Organization.
- In 2013, a Hindu temple in Surrey had three windows smashed. A baseball bat found there after the attack had Sikh markings.
- In 2022, the BAPS Shri Swaminarayan Mandir of Toronto was defaced with anti-Hindu and anti-India graffiti.
- In July 2022, a Gandhi statue in the premises of a Hindu temple in Richmond Hill was defaced with pro- Khalistan graffiti, which included the words "rapist" and "Khalistan". The incident was described as a hate crime by York Regional Police.
- In January 2023, the Gauri Shankar Temple of Brampton was defaced with anti-India and anti-Hindu graffiti. The founder and priest of the temple Dhirendra Tripathi stated "Khalistanis have caused fear among us. They have become emboldened and the community is uncertain about their next actions. Canadian authorities should take stern steps to curb their activities" after the desecration.
- In February 2023, the Ram Mandir of Mississauga was defaced with anti-India graffiti. The spray paint also described Jarnail Singh Bhindranwale as a martyr.
- In April 2023, the BAPS Swaminarayan Temple of Windsor, Ontario was vandalized with anti-Hindu graffiti. The Windsor Police acknowledged the hate-motived factor in the act.
- In July 2023, a pro-Khalistan poster was spotted outside the Bharat Mata Temple in Brampton targeting Indian diplomats to Canada. The temple volunteers removed the poster.
- In July 2023, the sign board of the Bhagavad Gita Park in Brampton was vandalized with anti-India graffiti.
- In August 2023, the Lakshmi Narayan Mandir in Surrey was vandalized with anti-India and pro-Khalistan posters placed on its front gate and rear wall.
- In September 2023, Sikhs for Justice released a video telling Indo-Canadian Hindus to "leave Canada" and "go to India" and further accused Hindus of being disloyal to Canada, after Prime Minister Justin Trudeau stated that Indian government agents were involved in Hardeep Singh Nijjar's slaying. The video was condemned by numerous Canadian politicians, including ministers in the federal cabinet and federal party leaders.
- In September–October 2023, 6 Hindu temples were broken into in Ontario, with 3 temples broken into in a single night. Surveillance videos show a large amount of cash being taken from the donation boxes, with an attempt to break into a safe in one of the temples. The temples included the Chitpurni Temple, the Rameshwar Mandir in Caledon, the Hindu Heritage Center in Mississauga, the Hindu Mandir Durham in Pickering, the Devi Mandir in Pickering, and the Sankat Mochan Mandir in Ajax.
- In July 2024, a BAPS temple in Edmonton was vandalized with graffiti labelling Prime Minister Narendra Modi and Nepean MP Chandra Arya as "Hindu terrorist(s)". A video of the desecration was promoted on social media.
- In August 2024, a pro Khalistan group gathered at a venue for an Indian Independence Day parade, and were heard shouting "Canadian Hindus go back to India". In the days preceding the event, the secessionist group Sikhs for Justice circulated flyers calling for a "face-off" between Khalistani Sikhs and Canadian Hindus.
- In November 2024, Khalistani demonstrators attacked temple-goers within the premises of the Hindu Sabha Mandir in Brampton with flag poles. Justin Trudeau, Pierre Poilievre, and Jagmeet Singh, along with other Canadian politicians, condemned the incident. As a result of the violence, Brampton Mayor Patrick Brown announced that he intended to introduce a motion at city council to prohibit protests outside places of worship in Brampton. Harinder Sohi, an off duty Peel Police sergeant, was temporarily suspended from duty for participating in the protest. Sohi was filmed holding a Khalistan flag outside the temple.
- In April 2025, the Lakshmi Narayan Mandir in Surrey was vandalized with pro-Khalistan graffiti.

== See also ==
- List of Hindu temples in Canada
- List of Hindu festivals
