= Fiji Sanatan Society of Alberta =

Coordinates: 53.5847°N 113.4470°W

Vishnu Mandir विष्णु मन्दिर Fiji Sanatan Society of Alberta
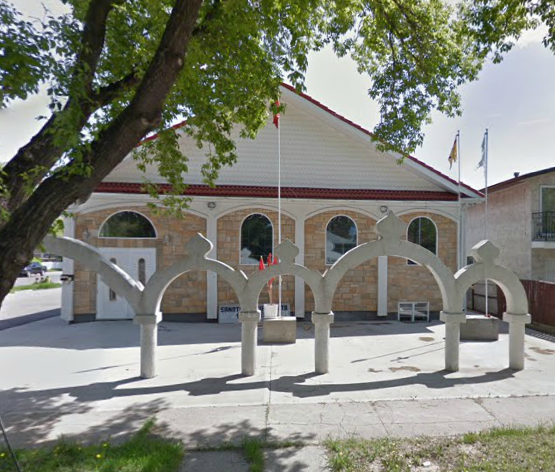
- Temple front entrance, 2013

General information
- Location: 12629 69 St NW, Edmonton, AB, Edmonton, Alberta, Canada
- Construction started: 1983
- Completed: 1984

The Fiji Sanatan Society of Alberta, also known as Vishnu Mandir (Devanagari: विष्णु मन्दिर) in Edmonton, Alberta, Canada is a modern-style Hindu temple that was built by some of the first Fijian Hindu immigrants in Edmonton in 1984. Hindus have been living in Canada for over a century, especially in Edmonton. Fijian Hindus began to settle in Edmonton in larger proportions starting in the 1960s and 1970s. They conducted prayers and meditated in individual households via groups they formed in the community. Talks of the need of a temple started in 1983 by four major Hindu Bhakti groups in Edmonton at the time, Shree Sanatan Dharam Ramayan Society, Edmonton Geeta Ramayan Congregation, Edmonton Vedic Congregation and later joined by Edmonton Prem Society, the group founded the Sanatan Board and raised funds to buy a property for the temple. It became the first Fijian Hindu cultural society in all of Canada, and till date is the largest. It started as a small place of worship in the Balwin residential area, constructed out of an old Church building. Since then it has been renovated 2 times, first adding a basement, then in 2006 expanded further making it the second largest Hindu temple in Edmonton.

== Mandir and Daily Rituals ==
While it is open every morning from 7:15AM–8:15AM, the Mandir is also open for prayers Monday for Shiva Pooja, Tuesdays for Hanuman Pooja, and primarily on Friday evenings for Maha Lakshmi Pooja, along with many festivals practised in the Hindu faith. The Temples has approximately 600 followers, as different ones attend during the prayers of different deities. Most festivals that are celebrated are common among Fiji Hindus, for example Ram Navami, Hanuman Jayanti, Kavadi Pooja, Krishna Janmashtami, Navaratri, Deepavali, Venkateswar Pooja, and Maha Shiva Ratri. The deities of the temple are of Lord Vishnu, Goddess Lakshmi, Lord Rama Darbar, Sri Krishna and Srimati Radharani, Lord Tirupati Bala, Lord Ganesha, Goddess Durga, Goddess Saraswati, and Lord Shiva.

== Deities of the Temple ==
- Vishnu Bhagavan and Lakshmi Mata as the primary deities.

- Shri Rama, Sita Mata, Lakshman, and Hanuman.

- Shri Krishna and Radharani.

- Ganesha, present both at the entrance of the Mandir and in the main altar.

- Durga Mata.

- Saraswati Mata.

- Venkateswara Swami.

- Entire Shiva Darbar with Shiva, Parvati Mata, Ganesha, and a grande Maha Shivalinga.

== Festivals of the Temple ==
- Ram Navami, celebrated for nine days from the first day of the Chaitra month to the Navami tithi. The first day (the new moon) marks Vedic New Year.

- Hanuman Jayanti.

- Krishna Janmashtami, celebrated for eight days from the full moon to ashtami tithi on which the birth of Krishna Bhagavan is marked.

- Navratri.

- Diwali.

- Maha Shivaratri.

The festivals above are typical of the North Indian traditions present among Fijian Hindus of North Indian ancestry. There are various South Indian Poojas that are marked throughout the year. The biggest and oldest one being the Venkateshwar Puja which is held in October. Others such as Kavadi and Thaipusam are also observed.

== See also ==
- List of Hindu temples in Canada
- Hinduism in Canada
- Hinduism in Fiji
