= Demographics of Winnipeg =

The demographics of Winnipeg indicate a multicultural and multilingual city. Winnipeg is also prominent in the size and ratio of its First Nations population, which plays an important part in the city's makeup. About 12.4% of Winnipeggers are of Indigenous descent, which exceeds the national average of 5.0%.

== Population ==
As of the Canada 2021 Census there were 749,607 people living in the City of Winnipeg, with 834,678 living in the Winnipeg Census Metropolitan Area. The median age of the population is 39 years old and the average is 40.

City Population
Year	Pop.	±%
1871	241	—
1881	7,995	+3217.4%
1891	26,529	+231.8%
1901	42,540	+60.4%
1911	136,035	+219.8%
1921	179,097	+31.7%
1931	218,785	+22.2%
1941	221,969	+1.5%
1951	235,710	+6.2%
1961	265,420	+12.6%
1966	257,005	−3.2%
1971	246,246	−4.2%
1976	560,874	+127.8%
1981	564,373	+0.6%
1986	592,551	+5.0%
1991	616,790	+4.1%
1996	618,477	+0.3%
2001	619,544	+0.2%
2006	633,451	+2.2%
2011	663,617	+4.8%
2016	705,244	+6.3%
2021	749,607	+6.3%
The drastic population increase between 1971 and 1976 was due in part to Winnipeg's amalgamation in 1972.

Metro Area
Year	Pop.	±%
1991	660,450	—
1996	667,209	+1.0%
2001	671,274	+0.6%
2006	694,668	+3.5%
2011	730,018	+5.1%
2016	778,489	+6.6%
2021	834,678	+7.2%

== Ethnicity ==
=== City of Winnipeg ===
Ethnic Origins
	Population	Percentage
English	137,075	20.7
Scottish	113,465	17.1
Canadian	108,955	16.4
German	105,910	16.0
Ukrainian	98,860	14.9
Irish	85,800	12.9
French	85,025	12.8
Filipino	58,255	9.0

There is a large Indigenous community in Winnipeg. Per capita, Winnipeg has more Indigenous residents (12.4%) than any other major Canadian city (population 100,000+). Despite being only the seventh-largest city in Canada, Winnipeg has the largest total population of urban and off-reserve Indigenous people in one city (90,995), including the largest total Métis population (47,915), and the largest total First Nations population (40,290). Per capita, Winnipeg is the Canadian city with the fourth-largest First Nations population (5.5%) and the largest Métis population (6.5%).

Winnipeg also has the largest Filipino population share (11.3%) of any major Canadian city, though the Toronto Filipino community is larger in absolute numbers (170,355 in Toronto, relative to 83,305 in Winnipeg). Winnipeg's Filipino population is largely concentrated in the West End and North End areas of the city. The neighbourhood around Sargent Avenue and Arlington Street is 45% Filipino, and the neighbourhood around Sargent Avenue and Wall Street is 47% Filipino.

Largest panethnic groups in Winnipeg by neighbourhood, 2021 census (grey areas have no data)

Panethnic groups in the City of Winnipeg (1996−2021)
Panethnic group	2021		2016		2011		2006		2001		1996	
Panethnic group	Pop.	%	Pop.	%	Pop.	%	Pop.	%	Pop.	%	Pop.	%
European (Note: Statistic includes all persons that did not make up part of a visible minority or an indigenous identity.)	392,035	53.22%	412,645	59.8%	438,470	67.46%	460,045	73.52%	476,120	77.99%	495,485	81.01%
Southeast Asian (Note: Statistic includes total responses of "Filipino" and "Southeast Asian" under visible minority section on census.)	93,590	12.7%	81,245	11.77%	63,390	9.75%	42,145	6.74%	35,025	5.74%	29,725	4.86%
Indigenous	90,995	12.35%	84,305	12.22%	72,335	11.13%	63,745	10.19%	52,415	8.59%	43,460	7.11%
South Asian	62,460	8.48%	37,570	5.44%	22,940	3.53%	15,080	2.41%	12,165	1.99%	11,330	1.85%
African	40,085	5.44%	26,890	3.9%	17,410	2.68%	14,200	2.27%	11,275	1.85%	9,845	1.61%
East Asian (Note: Statistic includes total responses of "Chinese", "Korean", and "Japanese" under visible minority section on census.)	28,090	3.81%	24,395	3.54%	19,065	2.93%	16,450	2.63%	13,395	2.19%	13,560	2.22%
Middle Eastern (Note: Statistic includes total responses of "West Asian" and "Arab" under visible minority section on census.)	10,315	1.4%	7,015	1.02%	4,640	0.71%	4,000	0.64%	1,880	0.31%	1,600	0.26%
Latin American	8,910	1.21%	6,715	0.97%	6,475	1%	5,390	0.86%	4,500	0.74%	3,890	0.64%
Other/Multiracial (Note: Statistic includes total responses of "Visible minority, n.i.e." and "Multiple visible minorities" under visible minority section on census.)	10,180	1.38%	8,635	1.25%	5,265	0.81%	4,645	0.74%	3,670	0.6%	2,735	0.45%
Total responses	736,660	98.27%	690,005	97.84%	649,995	97.95%	625,700	98.78%	610,450	98.53%	611,630	98.89%
Total population	749,607	100%	705,244	100%	663,617	100%	633,451	100%	619,544	100%	618,477	100%
Note: Totals greater than 100% due to multiple origin responses

=== Metro Winnipeg ===
Largest panethnic group in Winnipeg Metropolitan Region by census tract based on the 2021 census

Largest non-European panethnic group in Winnipeg CMA by census tract based on the 2021 census

Panethnic groups in Metro Winnipeg (2001−2021)
Panethnic group	2021		2016		2011		2006		2001	
Panethnic group	Pop.	%	Pop.	%	Pop.	%	Pop.	%	Pop.	%
European (Note: 2001-2016: Statistic includes all persons that did not make up part of a visible minority or an indigenous identity. 2021: Statistic includes all persons belonging to the non-indigenous and non-visible minority “White” population group.)	460,240	56.15%	473,360	62.16%	495,445	69.33%	514,715	75.03%	523,405	79.1%
Indigenous	102,075	12.45%	92,810	12.19%	78,420	10.97%	68,385	9.97%	55,755	8.43%
Southeast Asian	94,700	11.55%	81,875	10.75%	63,740	8.92%	42,275	6.16%	35,125	5.31%
South Asian	63,805	7.78%	38,100	5%	23,175	3.24%	15,295	2.23%	12,290	1.86%
African	40,920	4.99%	27,375	3.59%	17,840	2.5%	14,475	2.11%	11,440	1.73%
East Asian	28,525	3.48%	25,270	3.32%	19,375	2.71%	16,720	2.44%	13,470	2.04%
Middle Eastern	10,480	1.28%	7,110	0.93%	4,705	0.66%	4,020	0.59%	1,955	0.3%
Latin American	9,160	1.12%	6,825	0.9%	6,560	0.92%	5,475	0.8%	4,550	0.69%
Other/Multiracial	10,595	1.29%	8,810	1.16%	5,390	0.75%	4,680	0.68%	3,735	0.56%
Total responses	819,715	98.21%	761,540	97.82%	714,635	97.89%	686,040	98.76%	661,725	98.58%
Total population	834,678	100%	778,489	100%	730,018	100%	694,668	100%	671,274	100%
Note: Totals greater than 100% due to multiple origin responses

Largest ethnic origin in Winnipeg CMA by census tract based on the 2021 census

Top 20 Ethnic Origins in the Winnipeg CMA
Ethnic origin	2021		Ethnic origin	2011		Ethnic origin	2006	
Ethnic origin	Numbers	%	Ethnic origin	Numbers	%	Ethnic origin	Numbers	%
English	124,225	15.2	English	153,060	21.4	English	156,290	22.8
Scottish	114,495	14.0	Scottish	126,320	17.7	Scottish	126,740	18.5
Ukrainian	108,005	13.2	Canadian	123,445	17.3	German	121,565	17.7
German	102,045	12.4	German	121,470	17.0	Canadian	117,225	17.1
Irish	88,930	10.8	Ukrainian	115,230	16.1	Ukrainian	110,335	16.1
Filipino	81,135	9.9	French	97,720	13.7	French	97,410	14.2
French*	78,385	9.6	Irish	94,820	13.3	Irish	95,185	13.9
Canadian	60,320	7.4	Polish	58,535	8.2	Polish	58,050	8.5
Polish	54,450	6.6	Métis	58,440	8.2	Métis	42,175	6.1
Métis	52,370	6.4	Filipino	46,070	6.4	Filipino	38,275	5.6
East Indian	34,195	4.2	First Nations	40,010	5.6	First Nations	36,515	5.3
Chinese	26,845	3.3	Dutch	29,060	4.1	Dutch	30,310	4.4
Russian	25,370	3.1	Russian	25,415	4.1	Russian	23,385	3.4
Dutch	25,185	3.1	Chinese	20,410	2.9	Italian	18,580	2.7
First Nations*	22,540	2.7	East Indian	19,855	2.8	Icelandic	17,655	2.6
Italian	19,060	2.3	Italian	18,410	2.6	Chinese	16,695	2.4
Mennonite	19,010	2.3	Icelandic	18,210	2.5	East Indian	13,545	2.0
Icelandic	18,335	2.2	Swedish	13,910	1.9	Swedish	13,470	2.0
Swedish	13,410	1.6	Norwegian	12,340	1.7	Jewish	12,210	1.8
Punjabi	12,965	1.6	Jewish	11,995	1.7	Welsh	11,350	1.6
Portuguese	11,785	1.4	Portuguese	11,490	1.6	Belgian	10,680	1.6
Total	819,715	100	Total	727,500	100	Total	686,040	100

- Indicates not otherwise specified, for example, French may be French Canadian or from France. Additionally, First Nations are now broken down into ethnicity, i.e. Cree, Ojibway, or in this case they may not have specified.

==== Future projections ====
Panethnic origin projections (2041)
	2041	
	Population	%
European (Note: Statistic includes all persons that did not make up part of a visible minority or an aboriginal identity.)	430,500	38.61%
Southeast Asian	168,000	15.07%
Indigenous	145,500	13.05%
South Asian	138,000	12.38%
African	98,000	8.79%
East Asian	67,000	6.01%
Middle Eastern	28,000	2.51%
Latin American	19,000	1.7%
Other/multiracial	21,000	1.88%
Projected Metro Winnipeg Population	1,115,000	100%

== Language ==
=== City of Winnipeg ===
In 2011, Tagalog was officially the second most common mother tongue in Winnipeg, accounting for about 5% of the population, followed by French which is the mother-tongue for about 4% of the population.

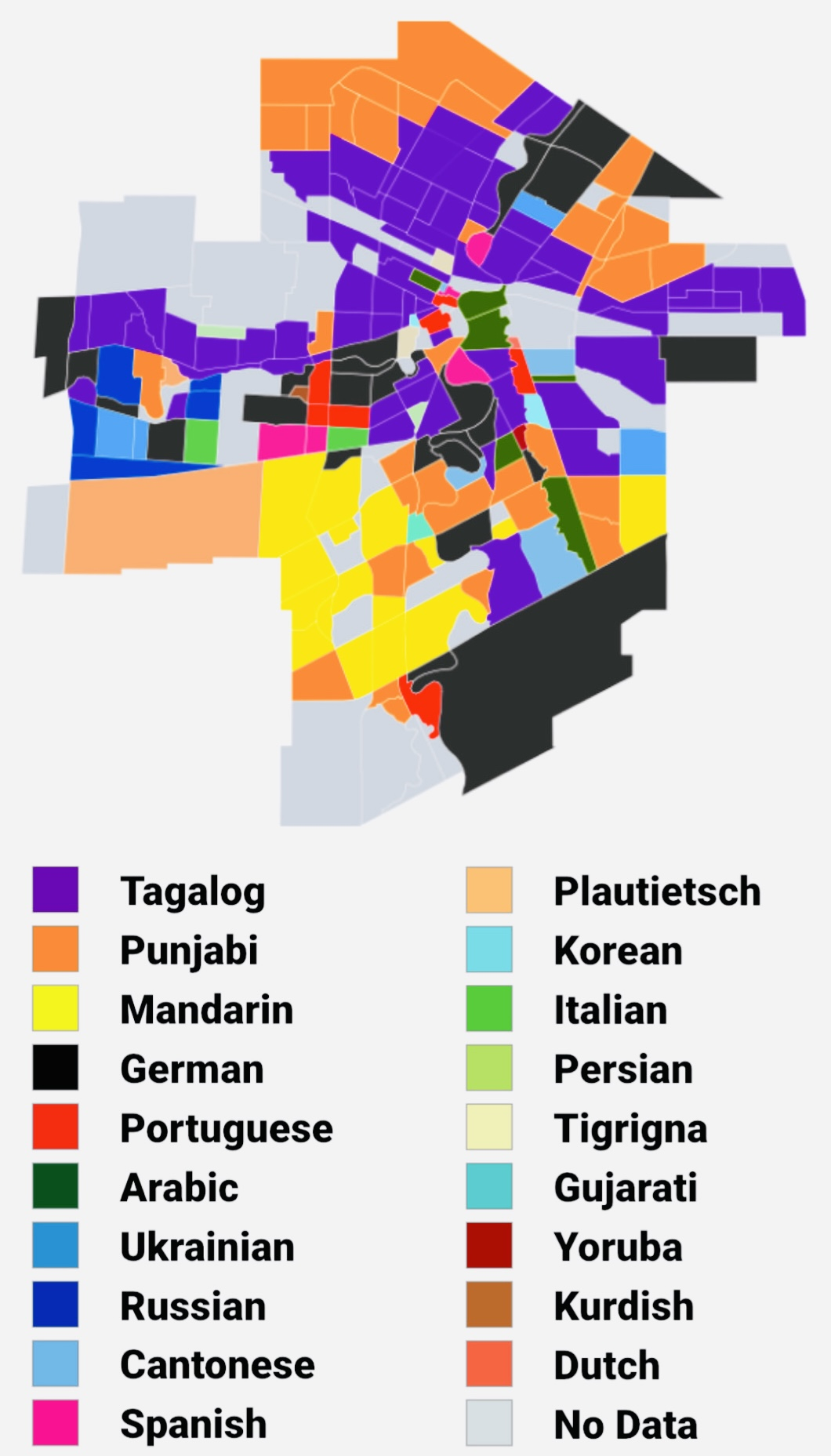
Largest mother tongue in Winnipeg by neighbourhood in the 2021 census. This map excludes the official languages of English and French.

=== Metro Winnipeg ===
The question on knowledge of languages allows for multiple responses.

Knowledge of Languages in Metro Winnipeg
Language	2021		2011		2001	
Language	Pop.	%	Pop.	%	Pop.	%
English	805,680	98.29%	711,285	99.53%	655,360	99.04%
French	83,365	10.17%	76,765	10.74%	74,460	11.25%
Tagalog	64,725	7.9%	45,745	6.4%	23,560	3.56%
Punjabi	40,105	4.89%	12,010	1.68%	6,130	0.93%
Hindi	23,670	2.89%	6,900	0.97%	3,245	0.49%
Spanish	16,550	2.02%	13,475	1.89%	10,655	1.61%
German	15,755	1.92%	23,485	3.29%	28,485	4.3%
Mandarin	15,240	1.86%	3,590	0.5%	1,490	0.23%
Ukrainian	9,720	1.19%	13,490	1.89%	20,865	3.15%
Russian	9,615	1.17%	5,495	0.77%	3,100	0.47%
Arabic	9,470	1.16%	4,485	0.63%	1,900	0.29%
Portuguese	8,605	1.05%	6,595	0.92%	7,965	1.2%
Cantonese	8,165	1%	4,365	0.61%	3,025	0.46%
Urdu	6,240	0.76%	2,315	0.32%	1,115	0.17%
Polish	6,145	0.75%	7,380	1.03%	11,005	1.66%
Vietnamese	6,015	0.73%	3,825	0.54%	3,900	0.59%
Yoruba	5,350	0.65%	—N/a	—N/a	—N/a	—N/a
Italian	4,860	0.59%	5,440	0.76%	6,740	1.02%
Gujarati	4,280	0.52%	1,310	0.18%	485	0.07%
Tigrigna	4,100	0.5%	1,010	0.14%	—N/a	—N/a
Korean	3,900	0.48%	2,660	0.37%	885	0.13%
Hebrew	3,690	0.45%	2,575	0.36%	1,625	0.25%
Amharic	3,370	0.41%	1,605	0.22%	—N/a	—N/a
Ojibway	3,265	0.4%	2,260	0.32%	3,535	0.53%
Ilocano	3,015	0.37%	1,165	0.16%	—N/a	—N/a
Swahili	2,775	0.34%	1,200	0.17%	550	0.08%
Bengali	2,660	0.32%	630	0.09%	275	0.04%
Serbo-Croatian	2,630	0.32%	2,085	0.29%	3,535	0.53%
Plautdietsch	2,190	0.27%	—N/a	—N/a	—N/a	—N/a
Cree	1,805	0.22%	1,555	0.22%	2,850	0.43%
Pampangan (Kapampangan, Pampango)	1,635	0.2%	—N/a	—N/a	—N/a	—N/a
Somali	1,590	0.19%	735	0.1%	—N/a	—N/a
Dutch	1,565	0.19%	1,935	0.27%	2,980	0.45%
Iranian; Persian	1,525	0.19%	—N/a	—N/a	—N/a	—N/a
Greek	1,500	0.18%	1,435	0.2%	1,655	0.25%
Igbo	1,400	0.17%	—N/a	—N/a	—N/a	—N/a
Cebuano	1,365	0.17%	—N/a	—N/a	—N/a	—N/a
Japanese	1,310	0.16%	860	0.12%	975	0.15%
Kurdish	1,170	0.14%	265	0.04%	365	0.06%
Lao	1,165	0.14%	960	0.13%	1,285	0.19%
Sinhala	1,160	0.14%	535	0.07%	425	0.06%
Malayalam	1,095	0.13%	310	0.04%	90	0.01%
Hungarian	1,035	0.13%	1,140	0.16%	1,680	0.25%
Chinese, n.o.s	—N/a	—N/a	6,430	0.9%	5,650	0.85%
Persian	—N/a	—N/a	1,950	0.27%	810	0.12%
Total Responses	819,715	98.21%	714,635	97.89%	661,725	98.58%
Total Population	834,678	100%	730,018	100%	671,274	100%

== Religion ==
=== City of Winnipeg ===
In 2001, 21% of Winnipeg was not religious. Ten years later, in 2011, 28.7% of the population was not religious (about 32% of males and 26% of females). The trend continued into 2021, when 36.4% of residents reported no religion or secular perspectives. The largest religion was Christianity, at 50.4% of residents (63.7% in 2011). 24.0% were Catholic, 12.9% were Protestant, 8.9% were Christians of unspecified denomination, 1.7% were Orthodox Christians, and 3.0% were Other Christian (/Other Christian Related Traditions.) After Christianity, the next largest religion in Winnipeg was Sikhism, which grew from 1.5% to 4.4% of the population between 2011 and 2021. Muslims were 3.3% of the population (1.7% in 2011), Hindus were 2.0% (1.1% in 2011), Jewish People were 1.5% (1.6% in 2011), Buddhists were 0.9% (1.0% in 2011) Adherents of Traditional (North American Indigenous) spirituality were 0.4% (0.3% in 2011) and Other Religions/Spiritual Traditions were 0.7% (0.4% in 2011.)

Religions in Winnipeg, 2021
Religion	Numbers	%
Christian	371,345	50.4%
Sikh	32,510	4.4%
Muslim	24,170	3.3%
Jewish	10,835	1.5%
Hindu	14,745	2%
Buddhist	6,860	0.9%
Other religions	5,440	0.7%
Traditional (Aboriginal) Spirituality	2,805	0.4%
No religious affiliation	267,945	36.4%
Total Population	736,660	100%

=== Metro Winnipeg ===
Largest non-Christian religion in Winnipeg CMA by census tract based on the 2021 census

Religious groups in Metro Winnipeg (1981−2021)
Religious group	2021		2011		2001		1991		1981	
Religious group	Pop.	%	Pop.	%	Pop.	%	Pop.	%	Pop.	%
Christianity	419,660	51.2%	460,755	64.47%	487,175	73.62%	511,070	79.16%	502,390	86.82%
Irreligion	300,190	36.62%	203,985	28.54%	139,535	21.09%	104,505	16.19%	53,685	9.28%
Sikhism	33,435	4.08%	9,885	1.38%	5,320	0.8%	3,290	0.51%	1,570	0.27%
Islam	24,565	3%	11,265	1.58%	4,805	0.73%	3,235	0.5%	1,635	0.28%
Hinduism	14,925	1.82%	6,840	0.96%	3,605	0.54%	3,105	0.48%	1,440	0.25%
Judaism	11,165	1.36%	10,740	1.5%	12,760	1.93%	13,330	2.06%	15,350	2.65%
Buddhism	7,010	0.86%	6,315	0.88%	5,365	0.81%	5,075	0.79%	1,730	0.3%
Indigenous spirituality	3,010	0.37%	1,850	0.26%	—N/a	—N/a	—N/a	—N/a	—N/a	—N/a
Other	5,755	0.7%	3,010	0.42%	3,170	0.48%	1,990	0.31%	580	0.1%
Total responses	819,715	98.21%	714,640	97.89%	661,725	98.58%	645,610	98.97%	578,625	98.94%
Total population	834,678	100%	730,018	100%	671,274	100%	652,354	100%	584,842	100%

== Immigration ==
=== City of Winnipeg ===
According to the 2011 National Household Survey, in the 10 year period 2001 to 2011, Winnipeg had 62,200 immigrants, which is just under 10% of the population (9.6%). Most of these (44,780) came in the last 5 years of that period.

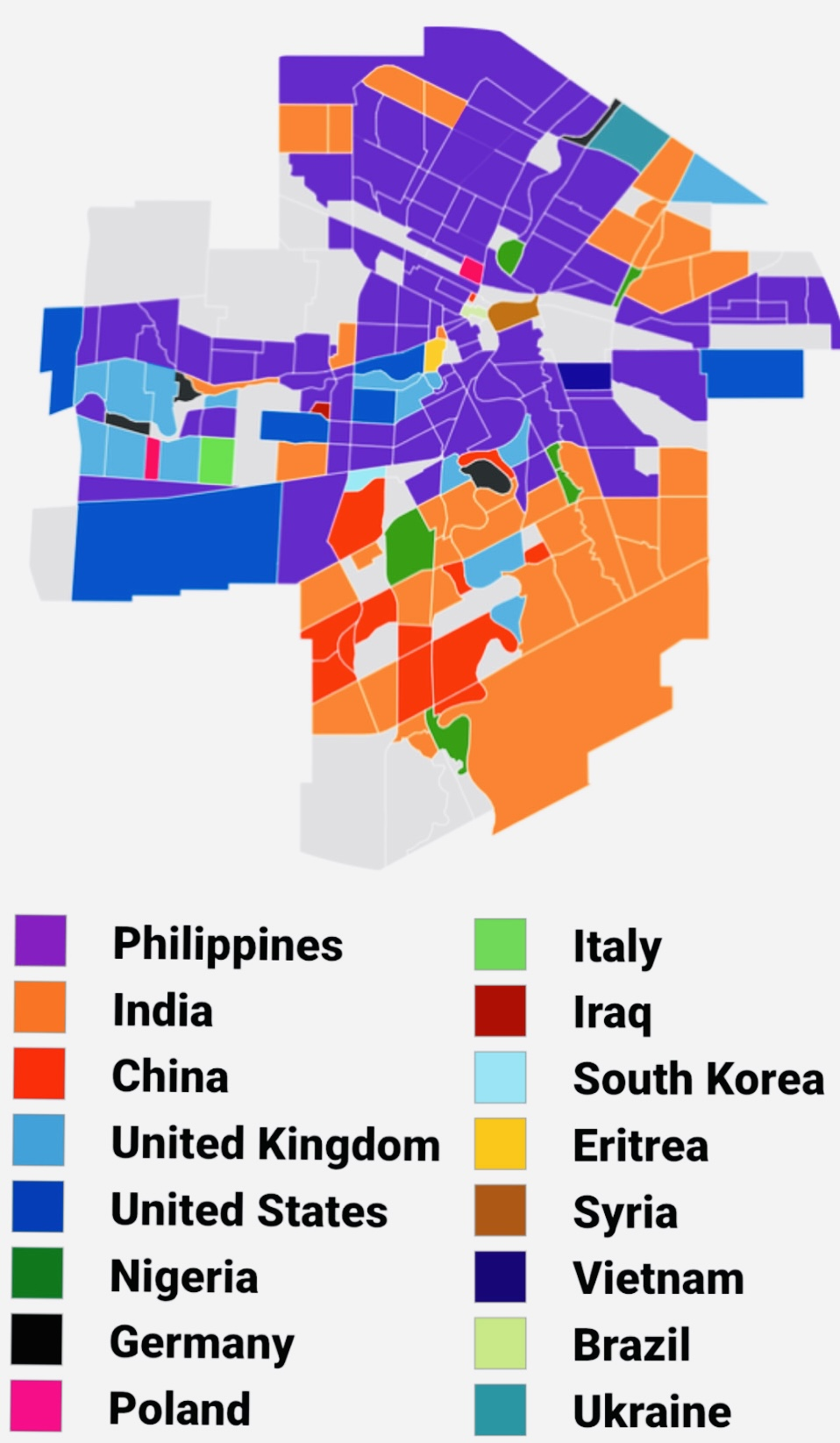
Largest nation of birth of immigrants in Winnipeg by neighbourhood, 2021 census (grey areas are non-residential)

Immigrants to Winnipeg by country of birth (2006 to 2011)
Rank	Country	Numbers	%
1	Philippines	21,360	47.7%
2	India	5,625	12.6%
3	China	2,420	5.4%
4	South Korea	1,065	2.4%
5	Nigeria	865	1.9%
6	Ukraine	735	1.6%
7	United States of America	600	1.3%
8	Ethiopia	580	1.3%
9	Pakistan	560	1.3%
10	Israel	505	1.1%

=== Metro Winnipeg ===
The 2021 census reported that immigrants (individuals born outside Canada) comprise 207,950 persons or 25.4 percent of the total population of Metro Winnipeg. While this represents a numerical increase, it is a significant proportional decline compared with one century prior, when the 1921 census reported that immigrants (individuals born outside Canada) comprised 85,233 persons or 47.6 percent of the total population of Winnipeg. (Note: Data from the 1921 census details the City of Winnipeg, as no metropolitan area with suburbs existed at the time.)

Immigrants in Metro Winnipeg by country of birth
Country of Birth	2021 census		2016 census		2011 census		2006 census		2001 census		1996 census		1941		1921	
Country of Birth	Pop.	%	Pop.	%	Pop.	%	Pop.	%	Pop.	%	Pop.	%	Pop.	%	Pop.	%
Philippines	62,485	30%	57,160	31.4%	43,390	29.5%	24,965	20.6%	20,105	18.4%	17,845	16%	—N/a	—N/a	—N/a	—N/a
India	28,245	13.6%	19,635	10.8%	11,310	7.7%	6,205	5.1%	4,915	4.5%	4,455	4%	134	0.1%	130	0.2%
China	8,975	4.3%	7,605	4.2%	6,010	4.1%	4,060	3.3%	3,470	3.2%	3,190	2.9%	676	0.7%	788	0.9%
Nigeria	7,540	3.6%	3,525	1.9%	1,325	0.9%	320	0.3%	285	0.3%	165	0.1%	—N/a	—N/a	—N/a	—N/a
United Kingdom	7,185	3.5%	7,550	4.1%	9,170	6.2%	10,385	8.6%	10,665	9.7%	13,205	11.8%	45,546	46.2%	44,186	51.8%
Vietnam	4,400	2.1%	4,105	2.3%	3,375	2.3%	3,350	2.8%	3,295	3%	3,065	2.7%	—N/a	—N/a	—N/a	—N/a
United States	4,345	2.1%	4,470	2.5%	4,560	3.1%	4,590	3.8%	4,390	4%	5,055	4.5%	6,760	6.9%	7,052	8.3%
Ukraine	4,295	2.1%	3,820	2.1%	3,360	2.3%	3,765	3.1%	3,510	3.2%	3,660	3.3%	—N/a	—N/a	4,623 (Note: Including Galicia)	5.4%
Poland	3,955	1.9%	4,680	2.6%	5,105	3.5%	6,600	5.4%	7,465	6.8%	9,125	8.2%	13,366	13.6%	2,776	3.3%
Pakistan	3,775	1.8%	2,845	1.6%	1,425	1%	1,135	0.9%	570	0.5%	365	0.3%	—N/a	—N/a	—N/a	—N/a
Germany	3,750	1.8%	4,795	2.6%	5,115	3.5%	5,550	4.6%	5,985	5.5%	6,480	5.8%	5,045 (Note: Including Austria)	5.1%	3,861	4.5%
Portugal	3,745	1.8%	4,060	2.2%	3,865	2.6%	4,395	3.6%	4,940	4.5%	5,430	4.9%	—N/a	—N/a	—N/a	—N/a
South Korea	2,680	1.3%	2,580	1.4%	1,960	1.3%	1,370	1.1%	495	0.5%	580	0.5%	—N/a	—N/a	—N/a	—N/a
Eritrea	2,610	1.3%	1,320	0.7%	655	0.4%	285	0.2%	250	0.2%	315	0.3%	—N/a	—N/a	—N/a	—N/a
Ethiopia	2,455	1.2%	2,230	1.2%	1,490	1%	1,440	1.2%	745	0.7%	620	0.6%	—N/a	—N/a	—N/a	—N/a
Italy	2,340	1.1%	2,600	1.4%	2,960	2%	3,300	2.7%	3,490	3.2%	3,655	3.3%	662	0.7%	689	0.8%
Russia	2,135	1%	2,165	1.2%	1,785	1.2%	1,670	1.4%	1,355	1.2%	1,725	1.5%	10,712 (Note: All individuals born in the Soviet Union)	10.9%	8,701	10.2%
Jamaica	1,840	0.9%	1,605	0.9%	1,300	0.9%	1,365	1.1%	1,550	1.4%	1,505	1.3%	72 (Note: All individuals born in the British West Indies)	0.1%	100	0.1%
Syria	1,690	0.8%	695	0.4%	185	0.1%	120	0.1%	60	0.1%	20	0%	70 (Note: Including Lebanon)	0.1%	69	0.1%
Brazil	1,595	0.8%	405	0.2%	330	0.2%	345	0.3%	225	0.2%	250	0.2%	54 (Note: All individuals born in South America)	0.1%	—N/a	—N/a
Total immigrants	207,950	25.4%	181,965	23.9%	147,295	20.6%	121,255	17.7%	109,385	16.5%	111,690	16.9%	98,551	33.9%	85,233	47.6%
Total responses	819,715	98.2%	761,540	97.2%	714,640	97.9%	686,040	98.8%	661,730	97.8%	660,055	98.9%	290,540	100%	179,097	100%
Total population	834,678	100%	783,099	100%	730,018	100%	694,668	100%	676,594	100%	667,093	100%	290,540	100%	179,097	100%

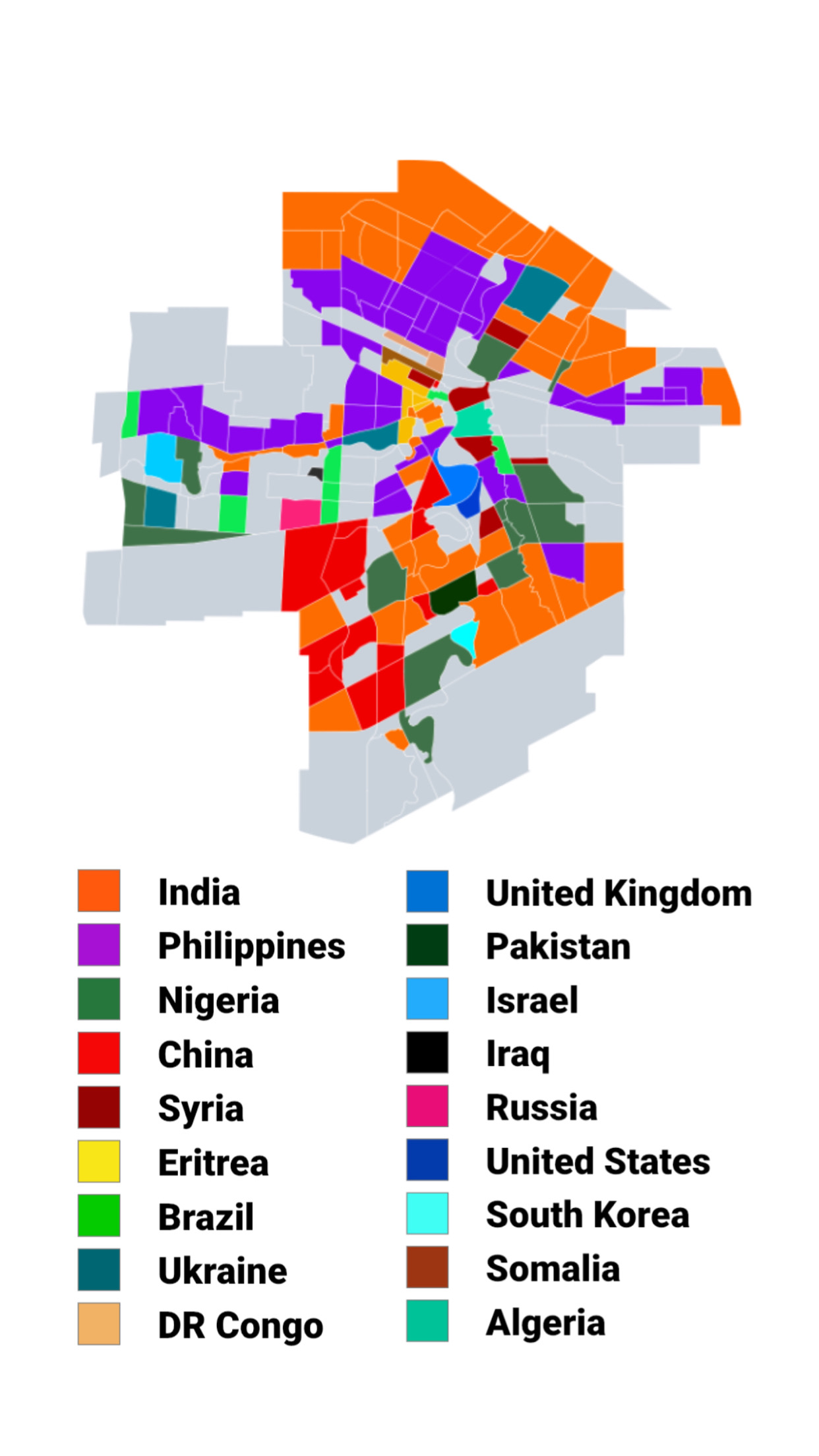
Largest nation of birth of recent immigrants (2016-2021) in Winnipeg by neighbourhood (grey areas are non-residential or have no recent immigrants)

The 2021 Canadian census counted a total of 46,500 people who immigrated to Metro Winnipeg between 2016 and 2021.

Recent immigrants to Metro Winnipeg by Country of birth (2016 to 2021)
Country of Birth	Population	% recent immigrants
India	11,205	24.1%
Philippines	7,970	17.1%
Nigeria	4,400	9.5%
China	3,365	7.2%
Syria	1,380	3%
Brazil	1,295	2.8%
Eritrea	1,225	2.6%
Pakistan	1,090	2.3%
Ukraine	955	2.1%
South Korea	755	1.6%
United States	660	1.4%
Iraq	645	1.4%
Bangladesh	570	1.2%
Ethiopia	545	1.2%
Vietnam	535	1.2%
Israel	470	1%
Russia	425	0.9%
Democratic Republic of the Congo	395	0.8%
Sudan	340	0.7%
Jamaica	335	0.7%
Somalia	305	0.7%
United Kingdom	280	0.6%
Colombia	275	0.6%
Iran	265	0.6%
Egypt	255	0.5%
Total	46,500	100%

== Income ==
The 2011 National Household Survey data showed that Winnipeg's after-tax median household income was $50,537. This was slightly lower than the national average ($54,098), and is in the bottom 10 of lowest median incomes in Canada. A study in 2013 showed that Winnipeg had two of the three poorest postal code areas in all of Canada (R3A and R3B, both located in the inner city) in regards to family income; in fact these are the two poorest that are located in cities (the poorest was a First Nations reserve in the Cape Breton area).

8,610 of Winnipeg's residents (who earn income) make and keep over $100,000 a year, which is 1.7% of the population. This ratio is higher nationally, at 2.6%.

The gender differences in income were less in Winnipeg by about 9% compared to the national medians. The median income for males in Winnipeg is $31,300, whereas for females the median is $23,739. This means a typical male makes about 31.9% more money than a typical female. This ratio is 40.5% nationwide.

== Education ==
According to the 2011 National Household survey, for those aged 25 to 64;

- 12.7% had no diploma, degree or certificate
- 87.3% had a high school diploma (or equivalent)
- 62.1% had a post-secondary education
  - 34.0% had a university education
  - 28.1% had a non-university education (trades, colleges, apprenticeships, etc.)
