= Sringeri Temple of Toronto =

Hindu temple

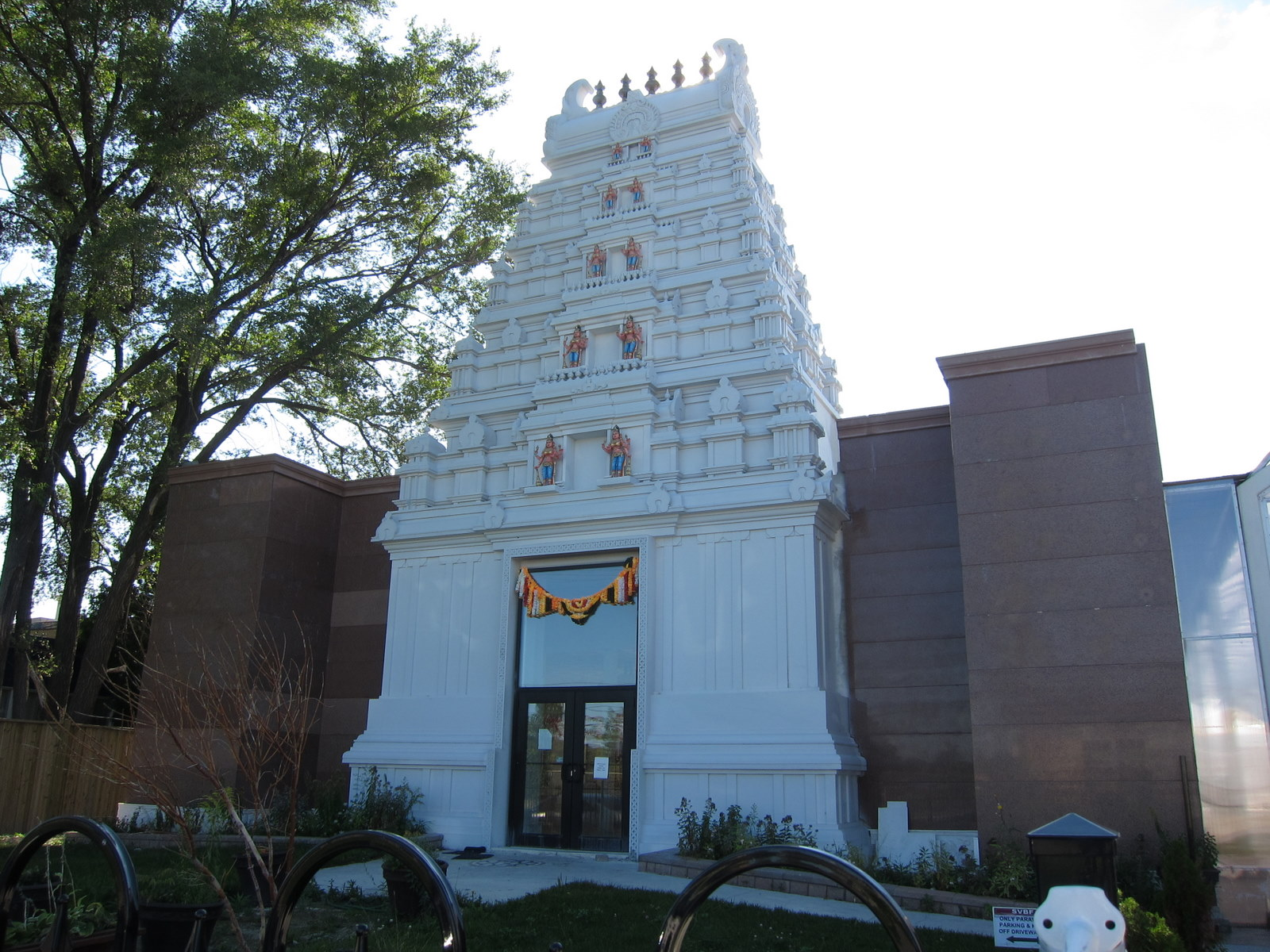
- The main rajagopuram facade of the Sringeri Temple

Religion
- Affiliation: Hinduism
- Deity: Goddess Sharadamba (Saraswati)

Location
- Location: 80 Brydon Drive; Toronto, Ontario; M9W 4N6
- Interactive map of Sringeri Temple of Toronto
- Coordinates: 43.72015°N 79.57356°W

Architecture
- Type: South Indian Architecture
- Creator: Sringeri Vidya Bharati Foundation
- Completed: June 20, 2010

Website
- Sringeri Temple of Toronto

The Sringeri Sharadamba Temple of Toronto (Kannada: ಶೃಂಗೇರಿ ಶಾರದಾಂಬೆ ದೇವಾಲಯ ಟೊರೊಂಟೊ), (Telugu: టొరొంటో శృంగేరి శారదా పీఠం), (Tamil: ஸ்ரிங்கேரி கோவில்) is a Hindu temple located in Etobicoke, Toronto, Ontario, Canada. The temple is dedicated to Goddess Sharadamba. It is more popularly known as SVBF Canada or Sringeri Vidya Bharati Foundation Canada. The temple is modelled after the original 8th-century Sringeri Sharadamba Temple located at Sringeri in Chikkamagaluru District in Karnataka, India.

== History ==
Built at a cost of $11 million, the temple was consecrated with waters from more than 250 rivers from around the world on Sunday, June 20, 2010. Over 10,000 devotees joined in the consecration in which priests scaled the temple's gopuram and poured sacred water over its carved facade. The Maha Kumbhabhishekam ceremony was recorded for live and delayed broadcast by several TV channels, including ATN, Tamil One, Omni Television, Vision TV, TV Asia, STAR News, Jaya TV and others, as well as numerous radio and print media, giving the event global coverage. On the occasion the Canadian Prime Minister Stephen Harper said, "The complex stands as a testament to Canada's and India's proud traditions of pluralism. This place of worship is an important landmark and a fitting tribute to the Hindu community's place in Canada's cultural landscape."

== Architecture ==
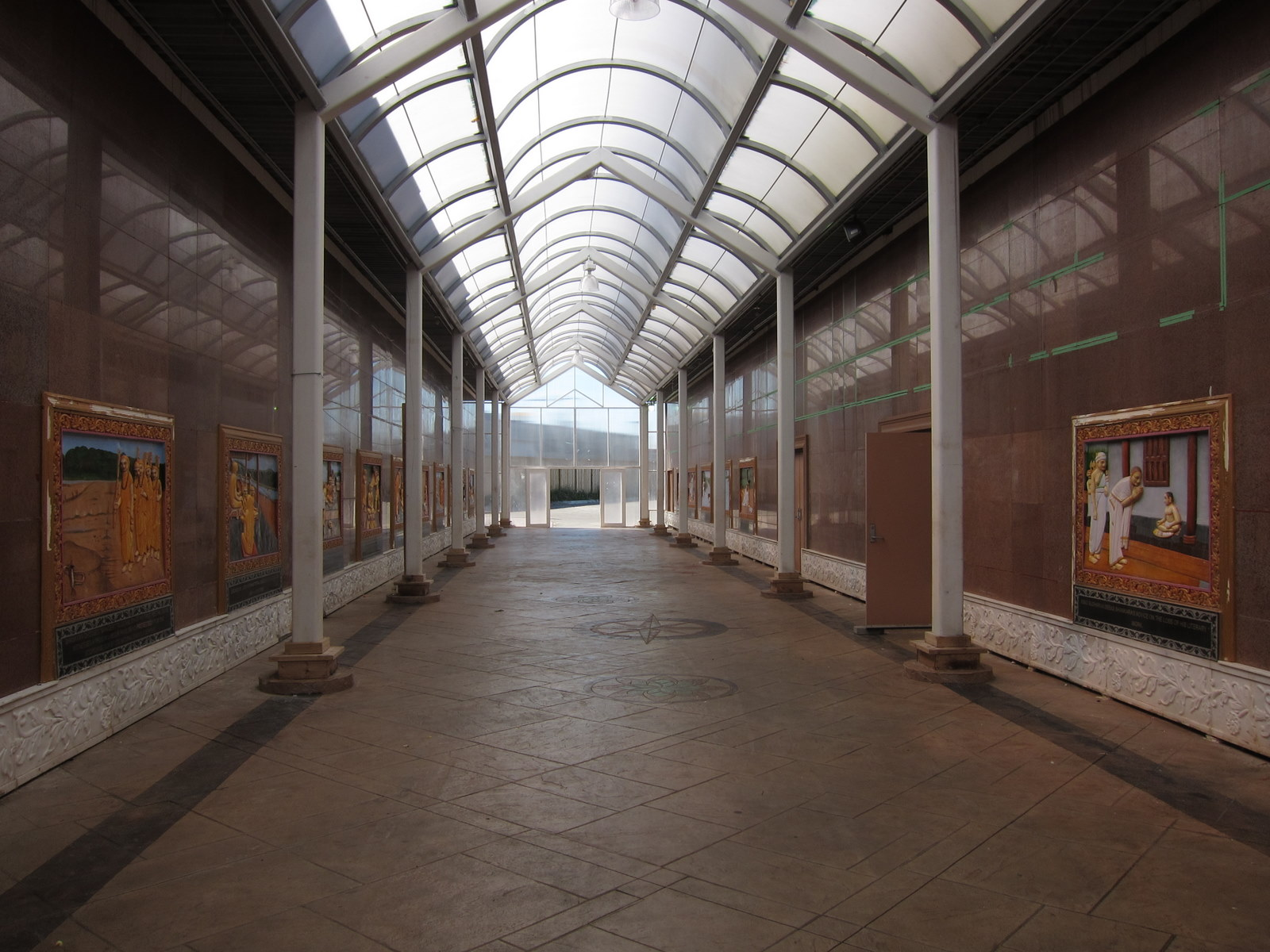
Ceremonial Passageway pictorially depicting the life of Adi Shankaracharya on the side walls

The temple has a rajagopuram following the style of South Indian temple architecture. It occupies about 30,000 sq ft. of land, with marble and granite imported from India. The 3 main features of the temple are a 30 ft. Gopuram, an 18 ft. Mandapam and a ceremonial passageway depicting the main events in the life of Adi Sankaracharya. The temple has an occupancy of about 500 persons. The granite and marble flooring of the temple is provided with heating for the winter.

The Sringeri Community Centre was inaugurated on 13 December 2008 and the newly renovated temple was inaugurated on June 20, 2010.

SVBF Canada aims to propagate universal values of higher learning and personal development for communities across Canada based on the age old Indian traditions. It is apt to recognize that the name "Sringeri Vidya Bharati Foundation" was chosen to bring the blessings of the current 36th Acharya Jagadaguru Shankaracharya Sri Sri Bharati Tirtha Mahaswamigal and the previous 35th Acharya Jagadaguru Shankaracharya Sri Sri Abhinava Vidya Tirtha Mahaswamigal.

There are eleven shrines inside the temple dedicated to the following deities:

- Goddess Sharadamba
- Lord Ganesha
- Chandramouli
- Adi Shankara
- Radhe Krishna
- Lord Rama
- Durga Devi
- Hanuman
- Lord Kartikeya
- Lord Venkateswara
- Navagraha

The Complex also houses a huge banquet hall, Adi Shankara Museum, Adi Shankara Library, Adi Shankara Vidyalaya offering free classes on music, bhajans, Sanskrit shlokas Vedas and many more faculties.
