= Hindu Heritage Centre =

- हिन्दू सांस्कृतिक केन्द्र
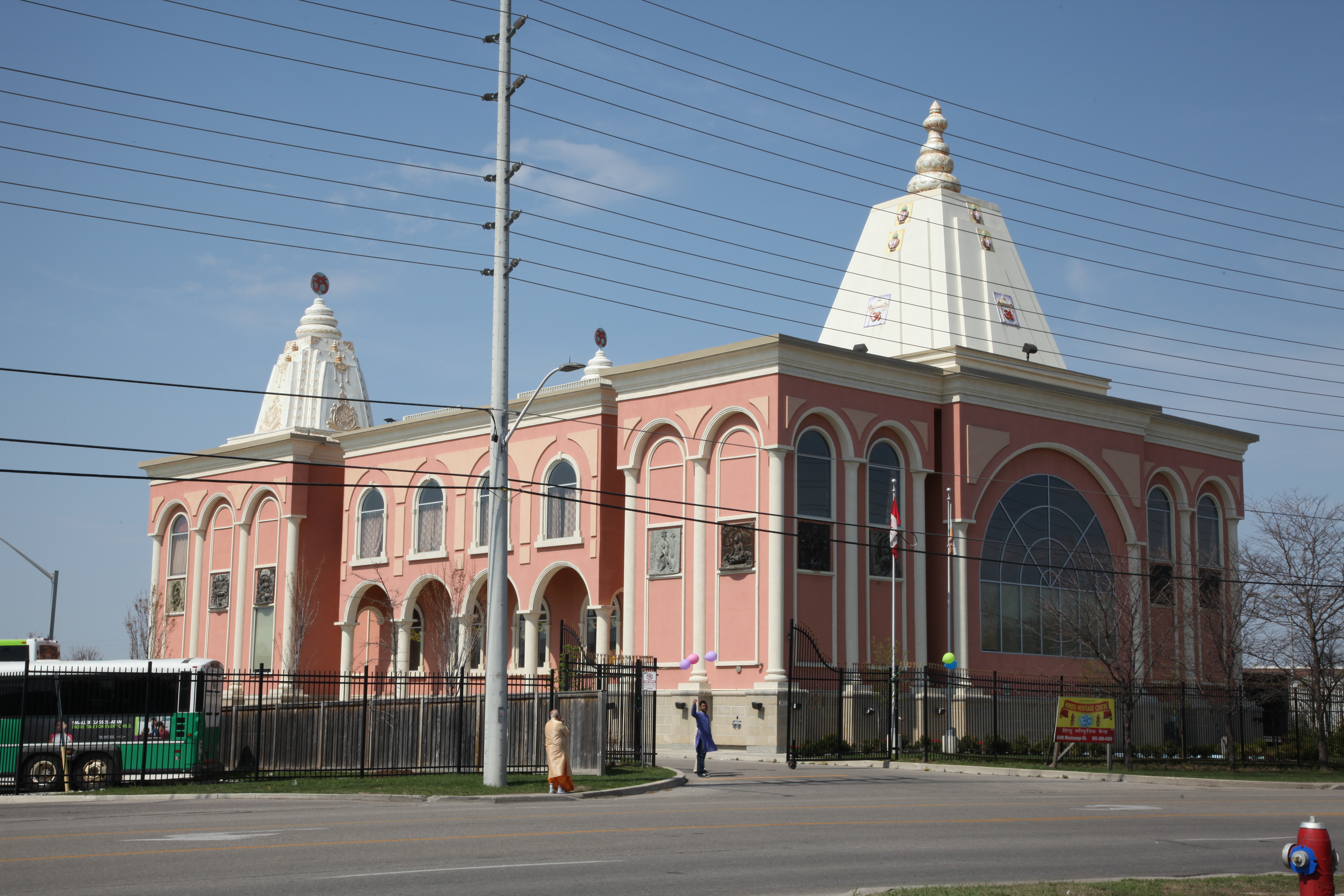
- The view of Hindu Heritage Centre from the front

- Location within Ontario

Religion
- Affiliation: Hinduism
- District: Mississauga
- Province: Ontario
- Festivals: Holi, Janmaashtami, Navaratri, Diwali

Location
- Location: 6300 Mississauga Road, L5M 1A7
- Country: Canada
- Interactive map of Hindu Heritage Centre
- Coordinates: 43.593827°N 79.730283°W

Architecture
- Architect: K Paul Architect Inc.
- Type: Hindu, with an infusion of European and Canadian.
- Creator: Surinder Sharma Shastri Co-founder & Head Priest, Dr Shachi Rattan Co-founder
- Completed: Construction commenced in 2006 and completed in 2011
- Monument: 14 shrines

Website
- http://www.hinduvision.com

Hindu Heritage Centre (Hindi: हिन्दू सांस्कृतिक केन्द्र) is a Hindu temple and a Hindu Community Centre located in the city of Mississauga, Ontario, in the Streetsville neighbourhood. The 25 000 square feet temple serves Hindus from the Greater Toronto Area and is considered to be one of the largest Hindu temples in Canada. It features a 10,000 square foot prayer hall, 16 classrooms where daily meditations and scripture teachings are also offered, as are classes in Indian languages, Hindu music and dance, Hindu culture, yoga, and social programs for seniors, and a 9,000 square foot banquet hall also exists for cultural events.

== History ==
The 2.4-acre land was purchased in 2005, and construction commenced in late 2006. The temple officially opened on a three-day celebration from May 5 to May 8, 2011. Former Ontario Premier Dalton McGuinty along with Ontario Ministers Eric Hoskins and Charles Sousa and local MPP Bob Delaney from Mississauga Streetsville, attended the official ceremony.

In 2011, Hindu Heritage Centre was nominated as an architecture icon of Mississauga by Door Opens Mississauga. As a part of the Culture Days celebration, every year three days of the week in July are dedicated to this program where guided tours of the temple are available.

On November 11, 2017 The Canadian Armed Forces represented by the Toronto Scottish Regiment took part in the first Remembrance Day Ceremony to ever be held in a Hindu Temple in Canada's history. The Military first marched to the Hindu Heritage Centre. The ceremony then took place where Hindu pundits blessed the regimental colours and conducted a ceremony of remembrance for Canada’s fallen soldiers. The Hindu Priest did a Shanti Paath for all the soldiers who sacrificed their life for Freedom in both world wars.

== Tallest Lord Ram Statue in North America ==
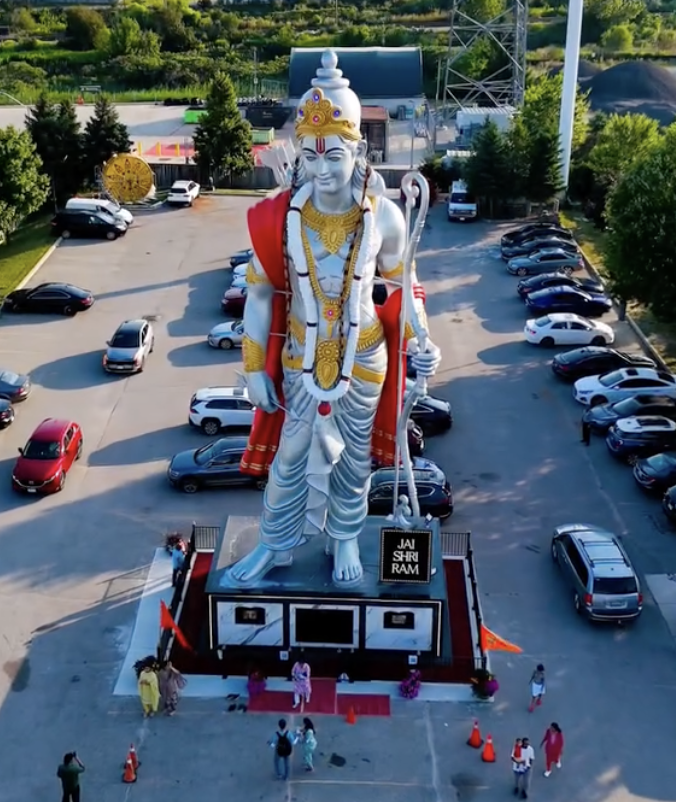
51 Feet Ram Statue in Mississauga, Ontario

In August 2025, the Centre unveiled the tallest statue of Lord Ram in North America: a 51-foot fibreglass idol (on a 7-foot pedestal, with plans for a future chhatri), fabricated in Delhi and assembled in Canada. Designed to withstand winds of up to 200 km/h and projected to last for a century, it was formally inaugurated on August 3, 2025, with a procession, Vedic ceremonies, and participation from federal and provincial dignitaries. More than 10,000 community members were a part of the inauguration. The statue quickly became a viral sensation and powerful symbol of cultural identity and unity in the Greater Toronto Area.

== Main deities at the Temple ==
- Durga
- Ganesha
- Surya
- Krishna and Radha
- Narayana and Lakshmi
- Shiva and Parvati
- Rama and Sita
- Lakshmana
- Hanuman

== Major festivals celebrated ==
- Navratri
- Diwali
- Maha Shivratri
- Lohri
- Makar Sankranti (Pongal)
- Holi
- Sri Rama Navami
- Karva Chauth

== See also ==
- World Hinduism
- Hinduism by country
- Hindu calendar
- List of Hindu temples
- Hindu temples in Canada
- List of Hindu deities
- List of Hinduism-related articles
- History of India
- Hindu scriptures
