= BAPS Shri Swaminarayan Mandir Toronto =

Hindu temple in Canada

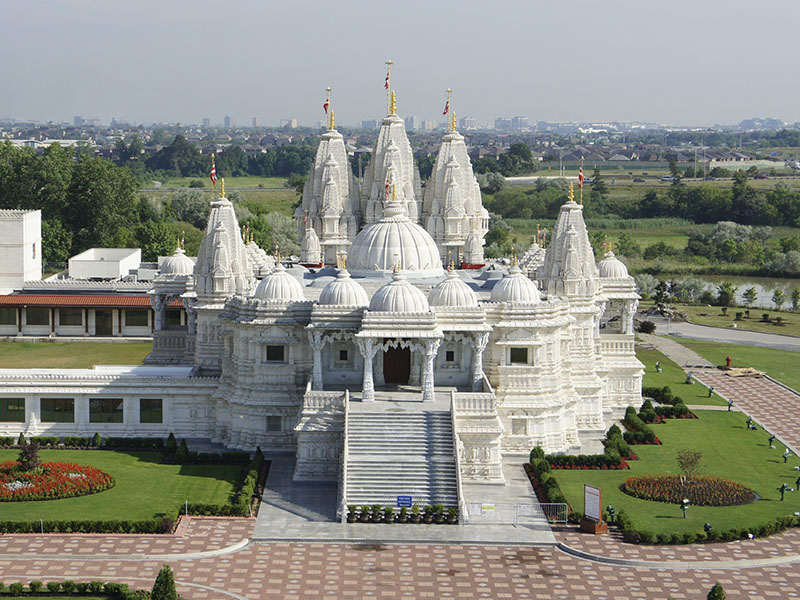

- Location within Toronto

Religion
- Affiliation: Hinduism
- Deity: Swaminarayan, Radha Krishna, Rama-Sita, Shiva-Parvati

Location
- Location: 61 Claireville Drive; Toronto, Ontario; M9W 5Z7
- Interactive map of BAPS Shri Swaminarayan Mandir Toronto
- Coordinates: 43.7386132°N 79.6270385°W

Architecture
- Type: Shilpa Shastras
- Creator: Pramukh Swami Maharaj / BAPS
- Completed: July 2007 (consecrated)

Website
- BAPS Shri Swaminarayan Mandir Toronto

BAPS Shri Swaminarayan Mandir is a Hindu temple in Toronto, Ontario, that was built by the BAPS Swaminarayan Sanstha. The BAPS Swaminarayan Sanstha, which is headed by Mahant Swami Maharaj, is a global spiritual organization within the Swaminarayan branch of Hinduism. The temple was built in 18 months and consists of 24,000 pieces of hand-carved Italian carrara marble, Turkish limestone and Indian pink stone. The temple is the largest of its kind in Canada and was constructed according to guidelines outlined in ancient Hindu scriptures. The grounds spread over 7.3 hectares (18 acres) and in addition to the temple, include a haveli and the Heritage Museum. The temple is open daily to visitors and for worship. On June 26, 2023, the temple celebrated its 16-year anniversary.

== Temple and daily rituals ==
The temple is a type of 'Shikarbaddha' temple, built according to principles laid out in the Shilpa Shastras, Hindu texts prescribing standards of sacred architecture. Within the temple, murtis (sacred images of the deities) have been installed in different shrines. The central shrine holds the murti of Swaminarayan, with Gunatitanand Swami to his left, together worshipped as Akshar-Purushottam Maharaj. Similarly, different shrines hold murtis of major ancient Hindu deities such as Radha and Krishna, Sita and Rama, Shiva and Parvati, Vishnu and Lakshmi, Ganesha, Hanuman as well as the lineage of BAPS gurus who are Swaminarayan's spiritual successors.

Once the divine has been invoked in a murti, it becomes an embodiment of the Divine. Accordingly, Swaminarayan swamis (Hindu monks) offer devotional worship to the deities throughout the day. Before dawn, they awaken the deities by singing morning hymns (prabhatiya). The deities are then bathed and offered food and garments depending on the time of the day and season. Food that has been offered to the deities is considered sanctified. These holy offerings are distributed to the devotees as prasadam. Throughout the day, aarti, a ritual where devotees sing the glory of Swaminarayan while a lighted wick is circulated before the murtis, is performed five times a day and named Mangala Aarti, Shanagar Aarti, Rajabhoga Aarti, Sandhya Aarti and Shayana Aarti, respectively. During midday, lunch is offered. In the evening, dinner is offered. Finally, the swamis put the murtis to rest by adorning them with night garments.

== Haveli ==
The temple's cultural center is referred to as the haveli because of its traditional Indian architectural style. The haveli is defined by an intricately carved wooden façade. Inside the haveli is a courtyard surrounded by teak and rosewood columns. The columns are characterized by motifs ranging from mythological stories, the sun and moon, and animals such as peacocks and elephants. The cultural center serves various functions. The assembly hall provides space for weekly congregations. Classrooms are used for youth cultural, religious and educational activities, which include music lessons, Hindu scripture classes and career development seminars. A full-size gymnasium is used for youth sports activities and dining after Sunday evening assemblies. A food shop provides visitors and members with an assortment of vegetarian snacks. There is a living quarters for the swamis who perform daily rituals in the temple.

=== Heritage Museum ===
The Heritage Museum houses the Understanding Hindu Dharma Exhibition, which aims to provide visitors with a foundation of the key tenets of Hinduism. It walks visitors through a culture and faith with origins in antiquity, beginning with an explanation of the origins of Hinduism and continuing to an explanation of the role of Hinduism today. It also showcases the role that Indo-Canadians have played in developments in the fields of art, architecture, science, democracy, education, culture, pluralism and spiritual values.

== Construction ==
On 23 July 2000, in the presence of Pramukh Swami Maharaj, devotees performed the shilanyas, or first stone-laying, ceremony on the future site of the Toronto shikarbaddh temple. Construction continued in various phases, beginning with the haveli and culminating in the opening on the shikharbaddh temple. The haveli was officially opened on 18 July 2004. At that time, the congregation held a Vishvashanti Mahayagna for world peace and family unity. Community leaders and representatives of various faith-based organizations were present for the event.

Before the haveli was built, the congregation held weekly assemblies at a hari temple in Etobicoke, Toronto.

The final phase of construction was completed in 2007. The official opening of the temple was held on 22 July 2007 in the presence of Pramukh Swami Maharaj. Then-Prime Minister of Canada Stephen Harper, then-Premier of Ontario Dalton McGuinty and then-Mayor of Toronto David Miller, were in attendance at the opening.

The opening of the temple was the culminating event in a three-day festival. The festival included a nagar yatra, or parade of the deities and devotees, through Toronto that displayed traditional Indian folk dances and music, in addition to a ceremony that brought together devotees to pray for world peace.

Construction of the complex benefited largely from donations and volunteer efforts. This service is viewed by contributing members as a form of devotion. BAPS devotees believe that seva, or "selfless service," can be offered physically, monetarily or through prayer. Seva is understood by devotees to be service volunteered to the community while holding God in remembrance.

Estimated to be built with a total cost of $40 million the temple is an architectural wonder. Its walls, pillars and ceiling consist of intricately crafted designs and statues as per ancient Hindu traditions from India. On a sunny day it looks like a sparkling crystal palace. During construction all 24,000 of its parts were first shipped to India, where they were carved and polished by skilled craftsmen then they were all numbered and shipped to Toronto, where more than 400 volunteers helped to assemble them bringing the temple to life.

In all 434 pieces were used to make up the ceiling of the front entrance alone. The temple is made following ancient Indian Vedic techniques with no steel skeleton holding it up, all of its walls are load-bearing.

The construction of the temple was completed relatively quickly transforming the barren field into a temple. The first stones were purchased less than three years before its inauguration but the actual construction time was only 18 months, it was funded entirely by donations.

== Events ==
In July 2017, the 10th anniversary of the temple was celebrated in the presence of Mahant Swami Maharaj, Canadian Prime Minister Justin Trudeau and Toronto Mayor John Tory.

=== International Women's Day celebrations ===
The temple hosts an annual conference in March in support of International Women's Day. Members of the community gather for the conference, to share ideas for the positive development of future generations of women. On 30 March 2013, the 6th annual conference was held. The theme was "Timeless Traditions: Celebrate the Past and Cultivate the Future". The conference focused on understanding and communicating the glory of Hindu traditions and preserving them in order to help nurture future generations.

In 2011, the conference was themed, "Honoring the Past, Envisioning the Future." The program highlighted the role of women in India's history and the present opportunities and challenges that face females in the Indian diaspora. The conference also commemorated the 100th anniversary of International Women's Day.

In 2010, the conference, themed "Nurturing Families, Shaping Communities", aimed to highlight the fundamental role women play in shaping Canada. The Honorable Diane Finley, Minister of Human Resources and Skills Development, spoke about Canadian Government initiatives that support women and their families.

=== Doors Open Toronto ===
From 2005 to 2009, the temple participated in the annually held event, Doors Open Toronto. This two-day event is intended to allow the public an opportunity to visit and learn about architecturally, historically, culturally and socially significant buildings in Toronto. There are over 100 such buildings on display annually. During the period in which the temple participated, volunteers provided guided tours throughout the temple and museum.

== Charitable initiatives ==
=== Annual gala ===
The BAPS Swaminarayan temple of Toronto previously held a gala each year to raise awareness, funds and support for various charities. Beneficiaries have included the Canadian National Institute for the Blind, the Heart and Stroke Foundation and charities that supported rebuilding efforts in light of natural disasters that occurred in Haiti and Japan.

=== Walkathons ===
Alongside BAPS centres throughout North America, the BAPS temple in Toronto holds an annual walkathon in support of various charities. Participants work to raise funds for BAPS Charities initiatives and local beneficiaries. In 2010, BAPS Charities Canada announced a pledge of $100,000 over five years for the SickKids Research and Learning Tower in Toronto.

=== Health fairs and lectures ===
BAPS Charities organizes an annual health fair and related lectures throughout the year. BAPS Charities (formerly BAPS Care International) is a humanitarian service organization that originated from BAPS with a focus on serving society. These events are free and open to the public and promote early detection and prevention techniques to support the wellness of communities. The 7th annual Health Fair was held on 14 October 2012. Various community organizations such as the Ontario Dental Association, Sick Kids Foundation, William Osler Health System, the Heart and Stroke Foundation, South Asian Diabetes Association and the Alzheimer's Association contributed to the event.

=== COVID-19 Pandemic ===
During the COVID-19 global pandemic, BAPS Charities has provided relief and assistance worldwide. On March 29, 2020, all six BAPS shikharbaddha mandirs in North America broadcast a special mahapuja performed by the swamis to pray on behalf of all those affected by the COVID-19 pandemic. Over 12,000 families in North America participated.

On 14 April 2021, BAPS Charities opened a vaccination clinic in conjunction with the William Osler Health System and Toronto Public Health at the temple. US Surgeon General Vivek Murthy praised BAPS Charities for increasing accessibility for the elderly by hosting these clinics.

== Gallery ==
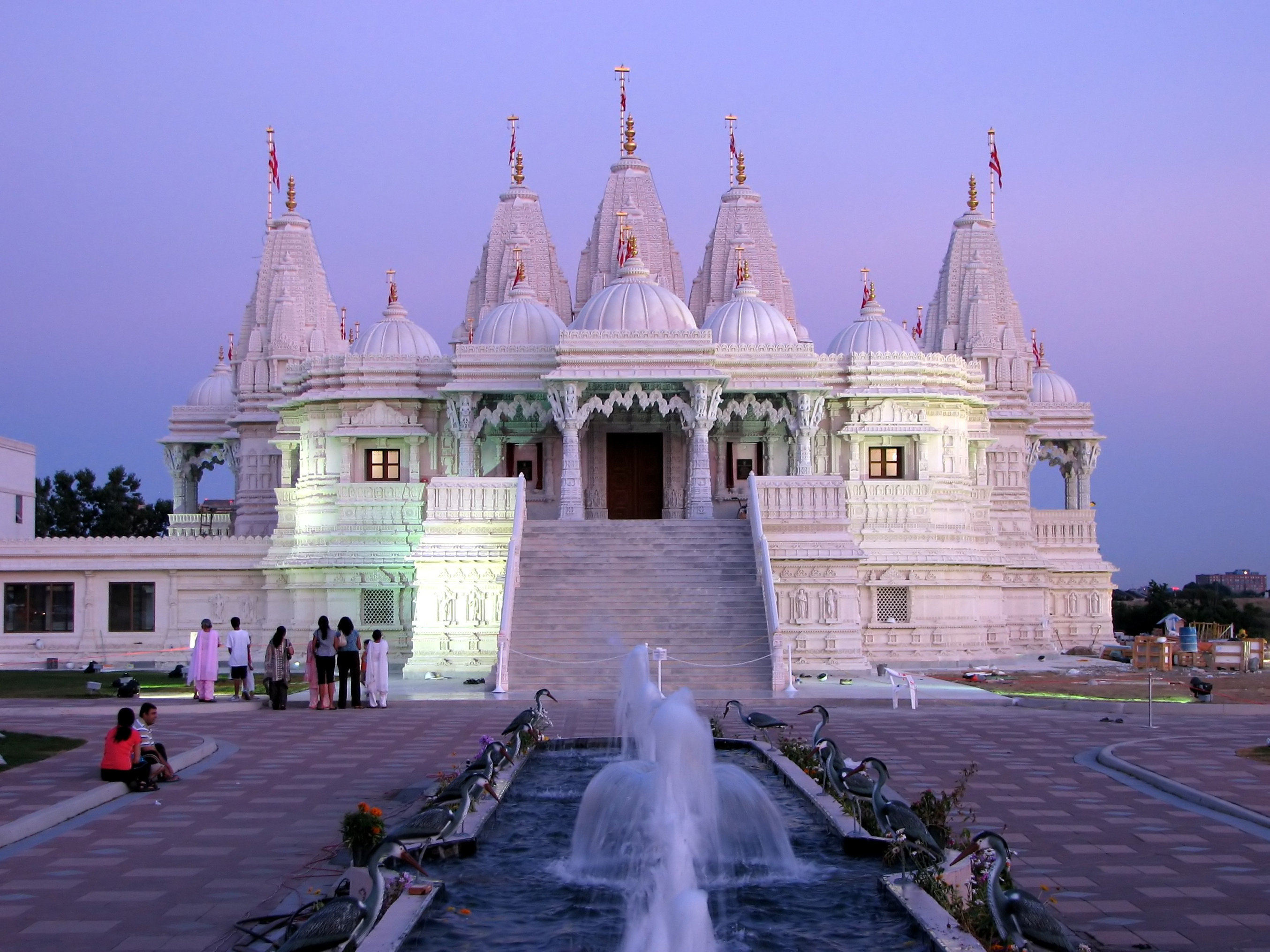

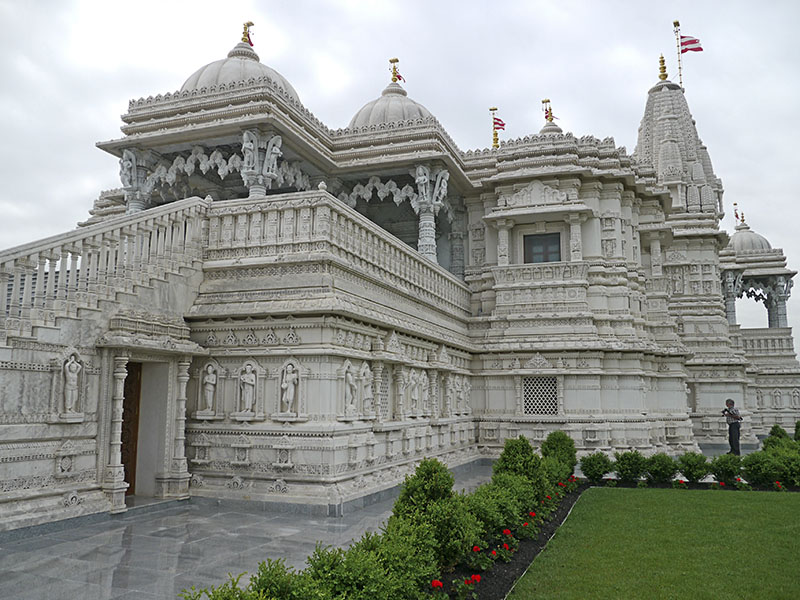

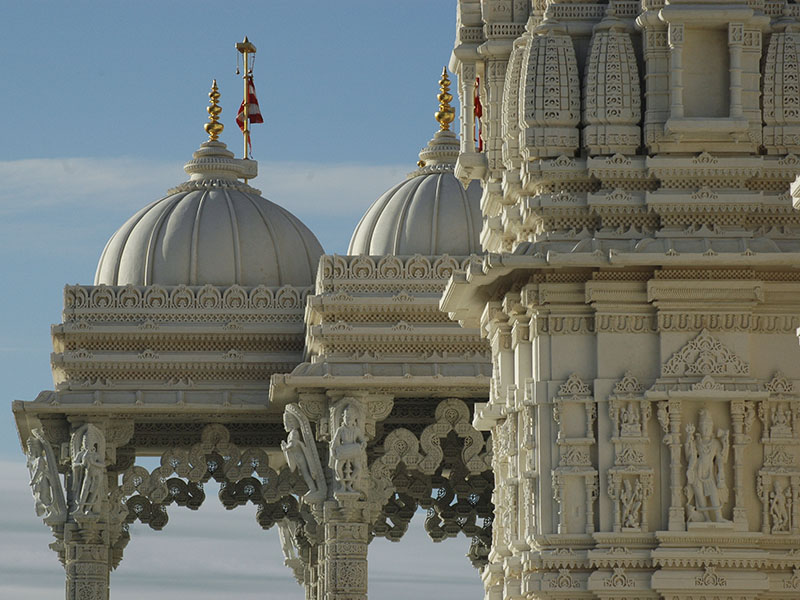

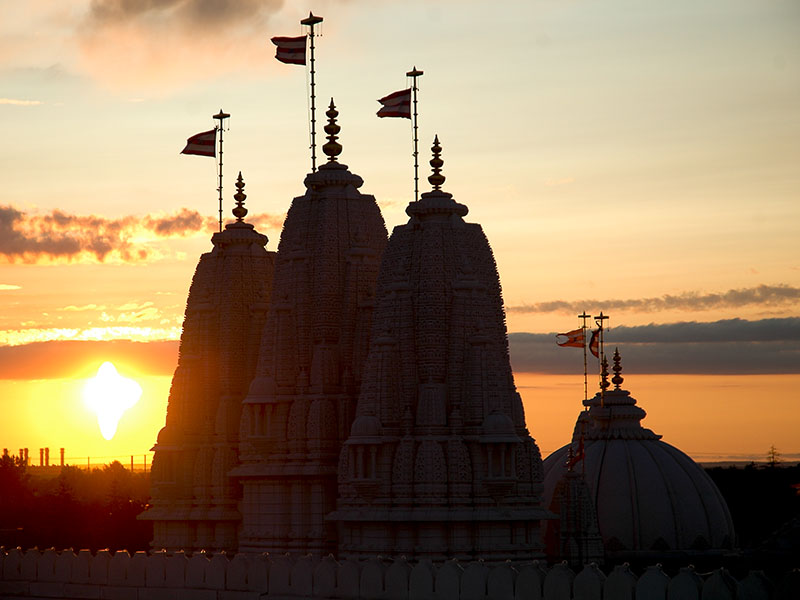

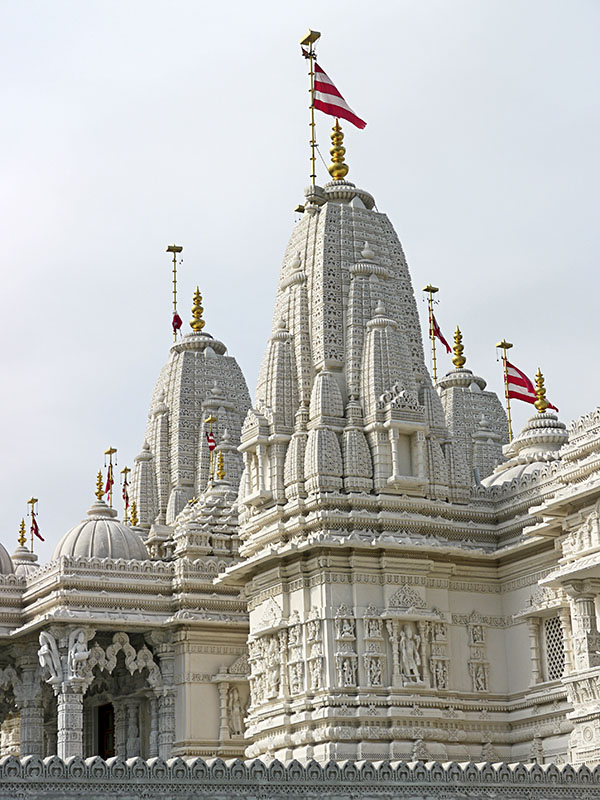

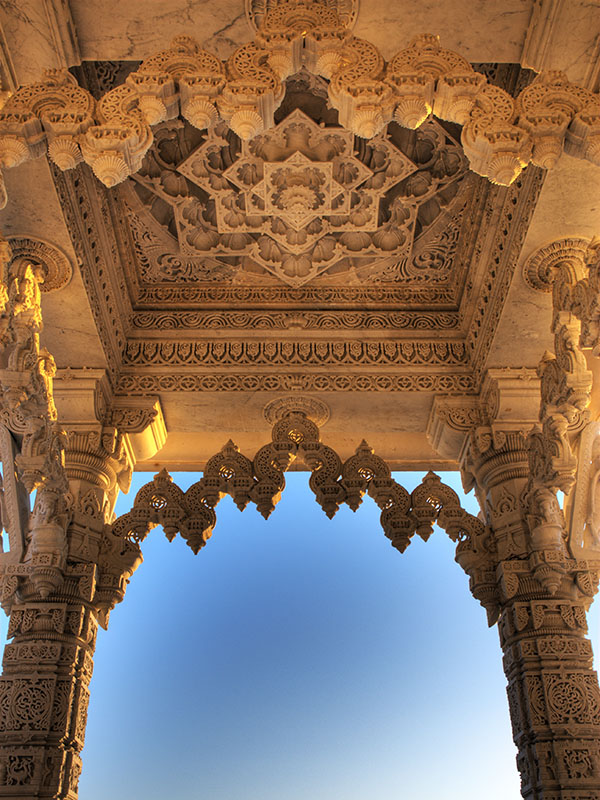

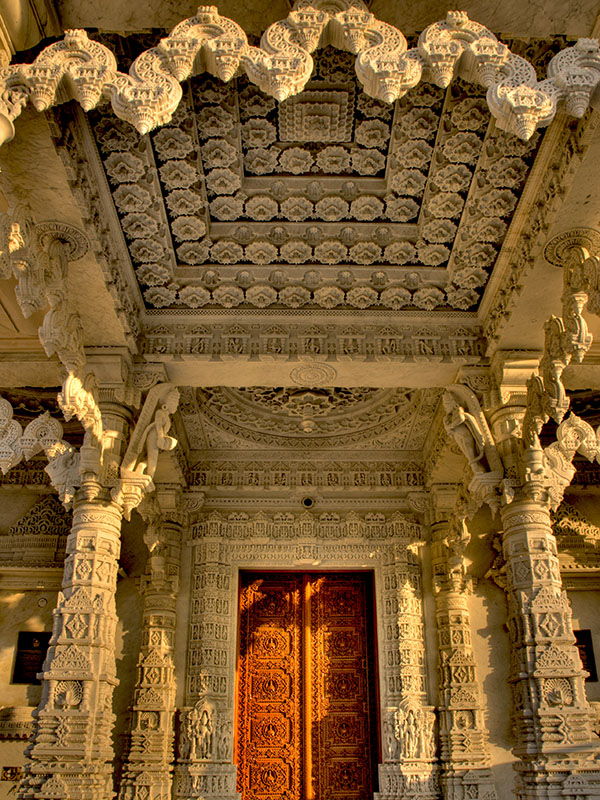

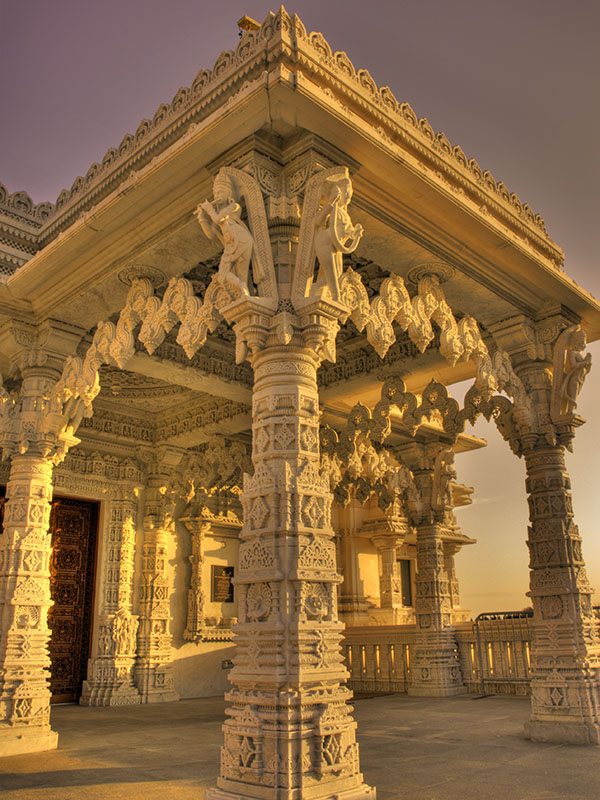

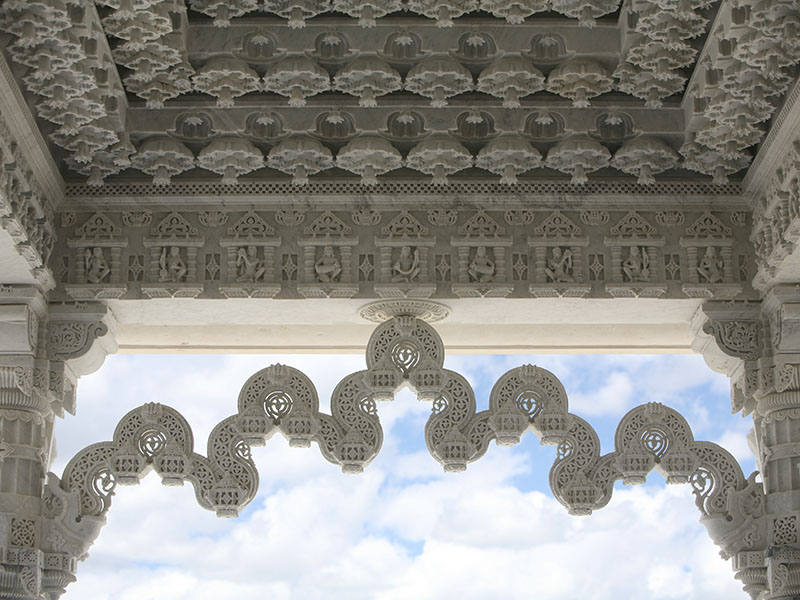

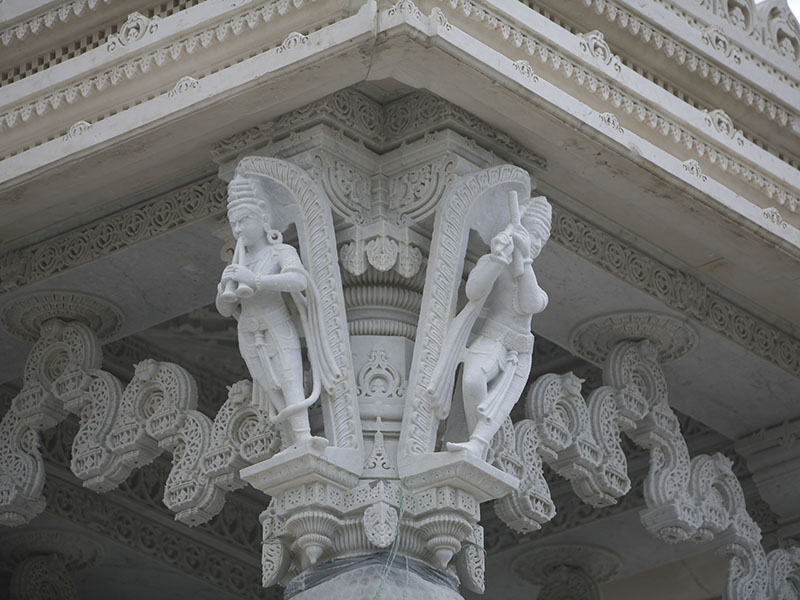

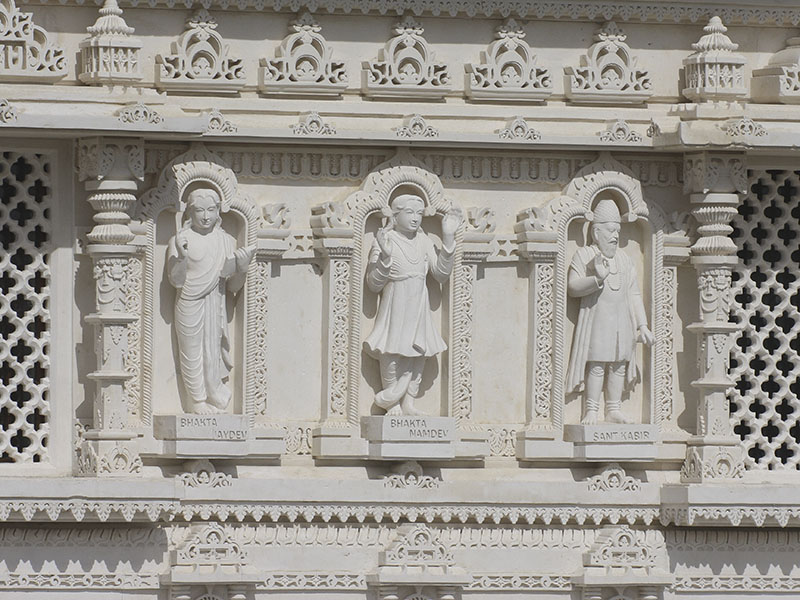

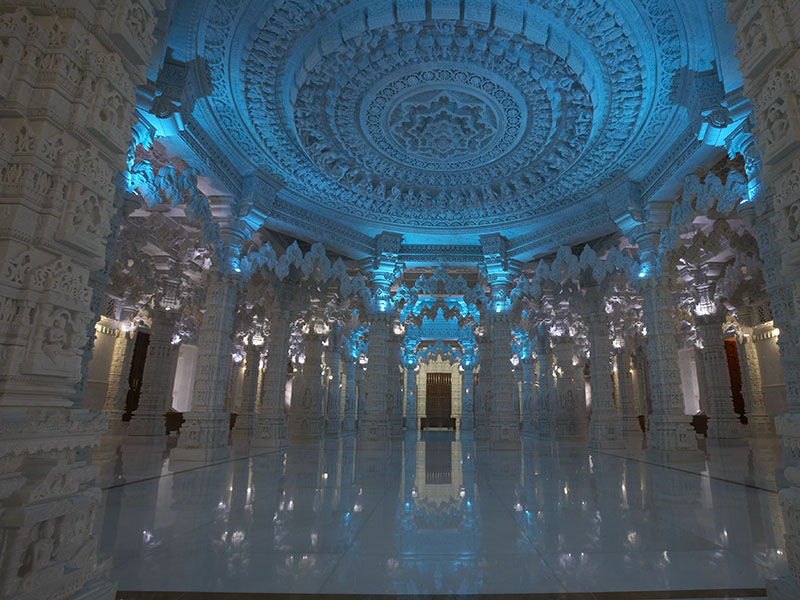

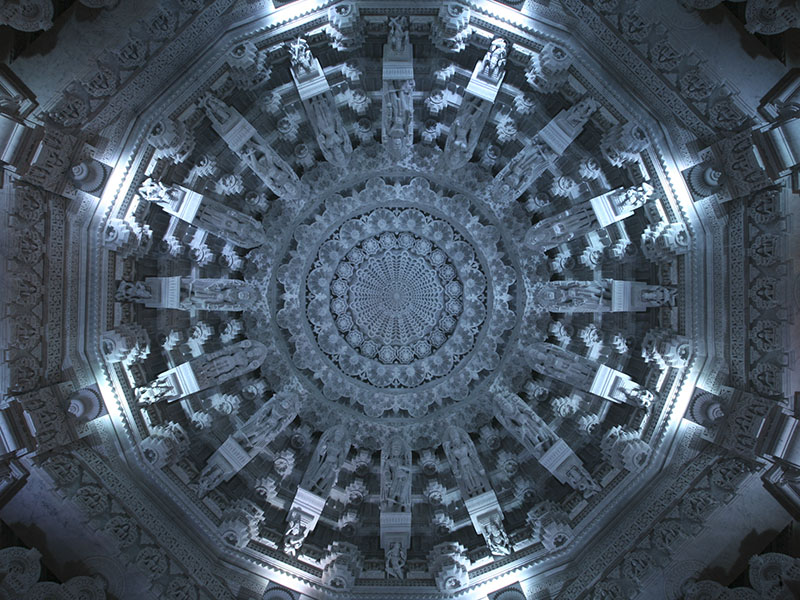

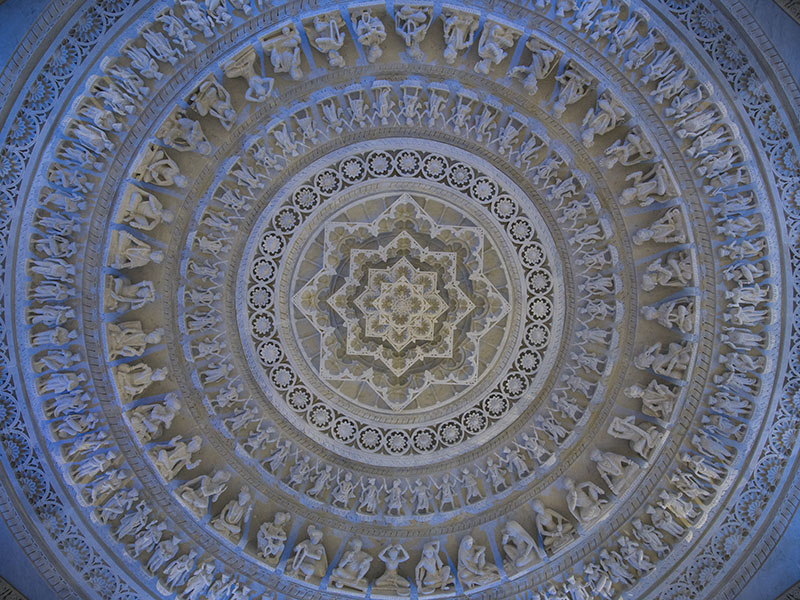

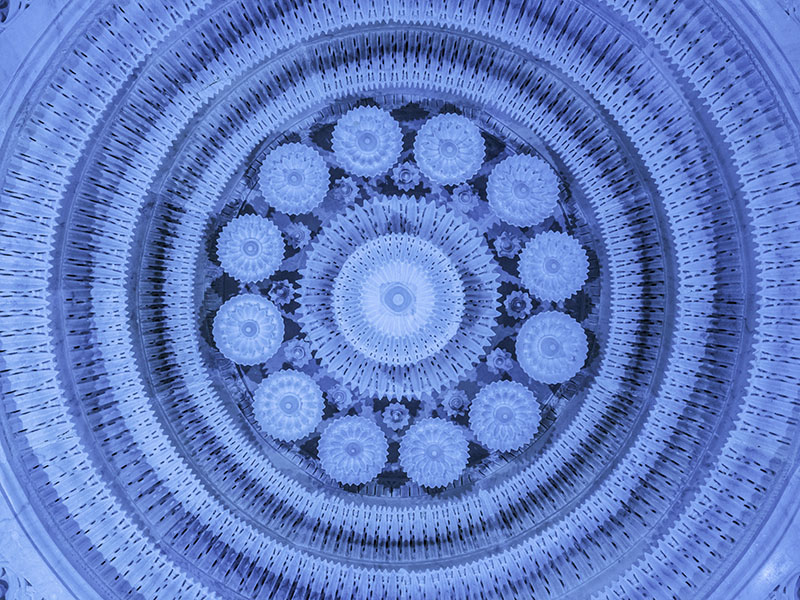

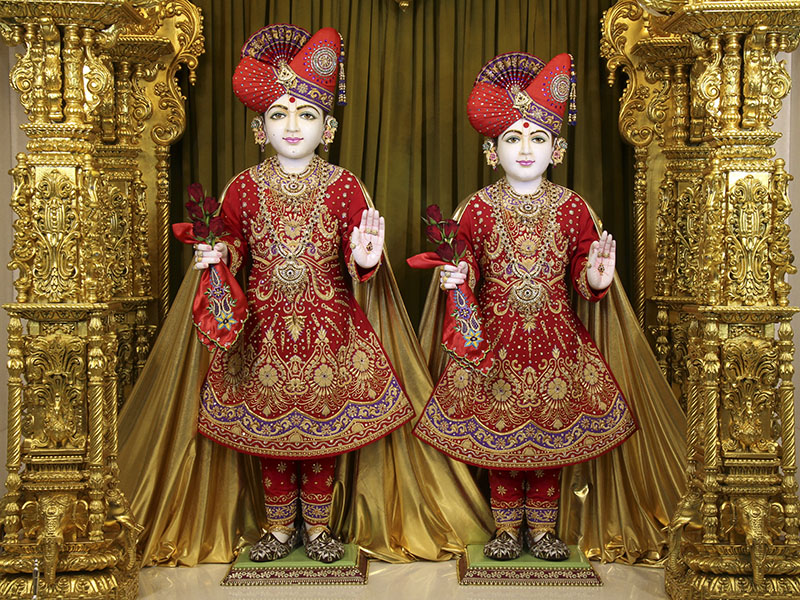
Bhagwan Swaminarayan and Gunatitanand Swami

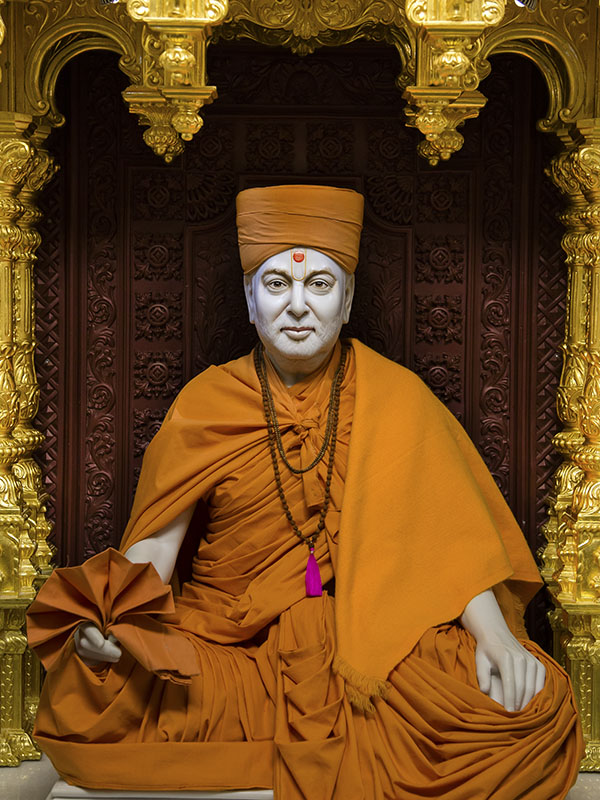
Pramukh Swami Maharaj

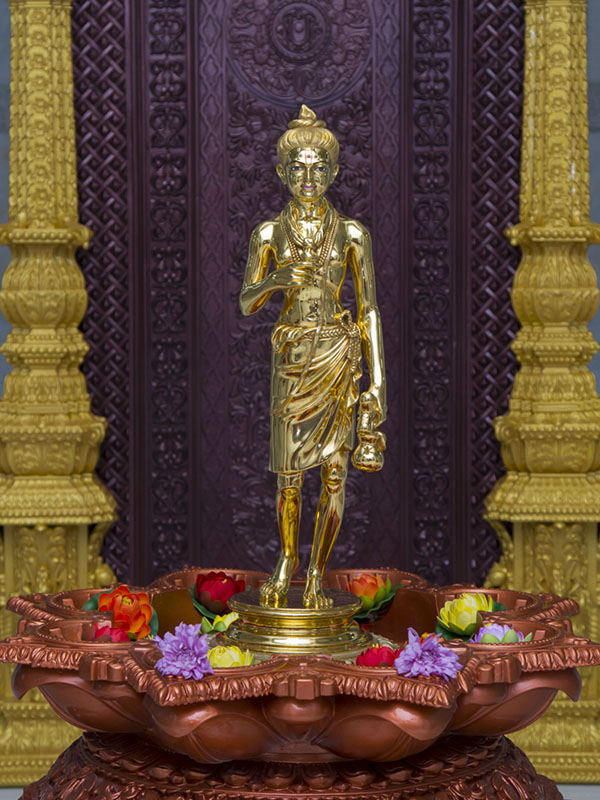
Neelkanth Varni/Swaminarayan
