= Demographics of Toronto =

Breakdown of Toronto's population

The demographics of Toronto, Ontario, Canada make Toronto one of the most multicultural and multiracial cities in the world. In 2021, 57.0 percent of the residents of the census metropolitan area belonged to a visible minority group, compared with 51.4 percent in 2016, and 13.6 percent in 1981. Toronto also has established ethnic neighbourhoods such as the multiple Chinatowns, Corso Italia, Little Italy, Little India, Greektown, Koreatown, Little Tokyo, Little Jamaica, Little Portugal, Little Malta, Roncesvalles (Polish), and Bloor West Village (Ukrainian), all of which celebrate the city's multiculturalism. Data from the suburban municipalities are also included for some metrics as most of these municipalities are part of the Toronto CMA (not to be confused with the Greater Toronto Area as they have different boundaries).

== Population ==
Toronto population by year, within present boundaries
Land Area	630.18 km^{2}	1,829.05 km^{2}	5,903.63 km^{2}
Year	City	Urban	CMA
1834	9,252	—	—
1861	65,085	—	193,844
1901	238,080	—	440,000
1931	856,955	—	810,000
1941	951,549	—	900,000
1951	1,176,622	—	1,262,000
1961	1,824,481	—	1,919,000
1971	2,089,729	—	2,628,045
1976	2,124,291	—	2,803,101
1981	2,137,395	—	2,998,947
1986	2,192,721	—	3,427,170
1991	2,275,771	—	3,893,933
1996	2,385,421	—	4,263,759
2001	2,481,494	4,375,899	4,682,897
2006	2,503,281	4,732,361	5,113,149
2011	2,615,060	5,132,794	5,583,064
2016	2,731,571	5,429,524	5,928,040
2021	2,794,356	5,647,656	6,202,225
For population figures for Toronto within its pre-1998 city limits, see Old Toronto.

The last complete census by Statistics Canada, which was taken in 2021, counted 2,794,356 living in Toronto, making it the most populous city in Canada and the fourth most populous municipality in North America.

Toronto's population grew by 2.3 percent from 2016 to 2021, with an annual growth rate of 0.46 percent.

2011 Census population data for the City of Toronto are found readily aggregated at a finer level than the city as a whole at i. the electoral district (riding) level (2003 redistribution) and ii. the neighbourhood level. The three ridings with the largest increase in population between 2006 and 2011 in the City of Toronto have been

- Trinity-Spadina (25.5%),
- Etobicoke-Lakeshore (7.3%), and
- Toronto Centre (7.3%).

=== Age structure ===
As of 2016 census

Age Groups	Total	Male	Female
0 to 14 years	398,135	204,190	193,933
0 to 4 years	136,000	69,895	66,105
5 to 9 years	135,025	69,345	65,680
10 to 14 years	127,105	64,940	62,165
15 to 64 years	1,906,495	925,070	981,420
15 to 19 years	145,525	74,240	71,280
20 to 24 years	194,750	97,415	97,330
25 to 29 years	232,945	113,905	119,035
30 to 34 years	224,580	108,895	115,680
35 to 39 years	196,310	94,065	102,240
40 to 44 years	182,390	86,535	95,860
45 to 49 years	190,925	90,860	100,065
50 to 54 years	202,405	98,735	103,670
55 to 59 years	182,805	88,145	94,655
60 to 64 years	153,865	72,265	81,600
65 to 85 years	426,945	184,325	242,615
65 to 69 years	130,540	60,360	70,185
70 to 74 years	93,600	42,315	51,285
75 to 79 years	76,160	32,730	43,430
80 to 84 years	60,630	25,670	34,965
85 years and over	66,005	23,245	42,750
85 to 89 years	40,800	15,665	25,135
90 to 94 years	19,680	6,180	13,500
95 to 99 years	4,750	1,275	3,470
100 years and over	770	120	650

Historical Populations
Year	Pop.	±%
1834	9,252	—
1861	65,085	+603.5%
1871	75,903	+16.6%
1881	113,128	+49.0%
1891	165,740	+46.5%
1901	238,080	+43.6%
1911	409,992	+72.2%
1921	611,483	+49.1%
1931	818,348	+33.8%
1941	909,928	+11.2%
1951	1,117,470	+22.8%
1956	1,358,028	+21.5%
1961	1,618,787	+19.2%
1966	1,881,691	+16.2%
1971	2,089,729	+11.1%
1976	2,124,291	+1.7%
1981	2,137,395	+0.6%
1986	2,192,721	+2.6%
1991	2,275,771	+3.8%
1996	2,385,421	+4.8%
2001	2,481,494	+4.0%
2006	2,503,281	+0.9%
2011	2,615,060	+4.5%
2016	2,731,571	+4.5%
2021	2,794,356	+2.3%

== Ethnic diversity ==
=== City of Toronto ===
Largest ethnic origin in the City of Toronto by neighbourhood based on the 2021 census

Pie chart of the population group breakdown of Toronto from the 2021 census.
1. European (43.5%)
2. South Asian (14.0%)
3. Chinese (10.7%)
4. Black (9.60%)
5. Filipino (6.20%)
6. Latin American (3.30%)
7. West Asian (2.50%)
8. Southeast Asian (2.00%)
9. Korean (1.50%)
10. Arab (1.50%)
11. Aboriginal (0.80%)
12. Japanese (0.50%)
13. Multiple visible minorities (2.30%)
14. Visible minority not included elsewhere (1.50%)

The 2021 Census indicates that 55.7 per cent of Toronto's population is composed of visible minorities, compared with 51.5 per cent in 2016. According to the 2021 Canadian census, 1,537,285, or approximately 10.7 percent of Canada's visible minority population, live in the city of Toronto; of this, roughly 67 percent are of Asian ancestry. Approximately 34.81 per cent of the city's population, or 961,325 individuals in the City of Toronto are Asian Canadians as of 2021. This makes for the second largest Asian population for a core North American city after New York City, as well as one of the highest ratios for a large city. Annually, almost half of all immigrants to Canada settle in the Greater Toronto Area. A study released by the Toronto District School Board (TDSB) in December 2012 found that 66 percent of students ages 4 through 18 came from visible minorities, with over 61 percent of students in 2012 identifying as Asian. East Asians made up the largest panethnicity (33 percent), with South Asians (28 percent) coming in second of the city of Toronto's overall population. 46,315 Aboriginals live in Toronto. There is a Hungarian Roma community in Toronto. Many Romani refugees live in Toronto. 61,000 Mexicans live in Toronto.

Panethnic groups in the City of Toronto (2001−2021)
Panethnic group	2021		2016		2011		2006		2001	
Panethnic group	Pop.	%	Pop.	%	Pop.	%	Pop.	%	Pop.	%
European (Note: Statistic includes all persons that did not make up part of a visible minority or an indigenous identity.)	1,201,075	43.5%	1,282,750	47.66%	1,292,365	50.17%	1,300,330	52.51%	1,394,310	56.75%
South Asian	385,440	13.96%	338,965	12.59%	317,100	12.31%	298,370	12.05%	253,920	10.34%
East Asian (Note: Statistic includes total responses of "Chinese", "Korean", and "Japanese" under visible minority section on census.)	351,625	12.73%	354,510	13.17%	327,930	12.73%	329,260	13.3%	301,060	12.25%
Black	265,005	9.6%	239,850	8.91%	218,160	8.47%	208,555	8.42%	204,075	8.31%
Southeast Asian (Note: Statistic includes total responses of "Filipino" and "Southeast Asian" under visible minority section on census.)	224,260	8.12%	194,360	7.22%	179,270	6.96%	140,050	5.66%	120,330	4.9%
Middle Eastern (Note: Statistic includes total responses of "West Asian" and "Arab" under visible minority section on census.)	111,360	4.03%	96,355	3.58%	79,155	3.07%	65,240	2.63%	59,560	2.42%
Latin American	92,455	3.35%	77,160	2.87%	71,205	2.76%	64,855	2.62%	54,350	2.21%
Indigenous	22,925	0.83%	23,065	0.86%	19,265	0.75%	13,605	0.55%	11,370	0.46%
Other/Multiracial (Note: Statistic includes total responses of "Visible minority, n.i.e." and "Multiple visible minorities" under visible minority section on census.)	107,135	3.88%	84,650	3.14%	71,590	2.78%	56,295	2.27%	57,840	2.35%
Total: Visible minority	1,537,280	55.7%	1,385,850	51.5%	1,264,410	49.1%	1,162,625	47%	1,062,505	42.8%
Total responses	2,761,285	98.82%	2,691,665	98.54%	2,576,025	98.51%	2,476,565	98.93%	2,456,805	99.01%
Total population	2,794,356	100%	2,731,571	100%	2,615,060	100%	2,503,281	100%	2,481,494	100%
Note: Totals greater than 100% due to multiple origin responses

Change between 2011 and 2016:

Increase:

- Filipino: +20,270 (+0.6%)
- Black: +21,690 (+0.4%)
- Chinese: +21,070 (+0.3%)
- South Asian: +21,865 (+0.3%)
- Multiple visible minorities: +9,755 (+0.3%)
- Arab: +7,110 (+0.2%)
- Latin American: +5,955 (+0.1%)
- Korean: +4,415 (+0.1%)
- Aboriginal: +3,800 (+0.2%)
- Visible minority, n.i.e.: 3,305 (+0.1%)
- Japanese: +1,095 (-)

Decrease:

- White: -9,615 (-2.5%)
- Southeast Asian: -5,180 (-0.3%)

The most prevalent ethnic origins in the City of Toronto are as follows:

Top 20 Ethnic origins in the City of Toronto	Population (2016)	Percentage	Riding with Highest Concentration	Percentage
(China) Chinese	332,830	12.5	Scarborough—Agincourt	47.0
(England) English	331,890	12.3	Beaches—East York	24.2
(Canada) Canadian	323,175	12.0	Beaches—East York	19.7
(Republic of Ireland) Irish	262,965	9.8	Parkdale—High Park	20.0
(Scotland) Scottish	256,250	9.5	Beaches—East York	18.9
(India) East Indian	202,675	7.5	Etobicoke North	22.2
(Italy) Italian	182,495	6.8	Etobicoke Centre	15.1
(Philippines) Filipino	162,605	6.0	York Centre	17.0
(Germany) German	130,900	4.9	Parkdale—High Park	9.8
(France) French	122,615	4.6	Parkdale—High Park	8.9
(Poland) Polish	114,530	4.3	Eglinton—Lawrence	12.0
(Portugal) Portuguese	100,420	3.7	Davenport	22.7
(Jamaica) Jamaican	90,065	3.3	Humber River—Black Creek	8.5
(Russia) Russian	74,465	2.8	York Centre	9.5
(Ukraine) Ukrainian	72,340	2.7	Etobicoke Centre	8.1
(Sri Lanka) Sri Lankan	58,180	2.2	Scarborough—Rouge Park	11.1
(Greece) Greek	57,425	2.1	Toronto—Danforth	7.3
(Spain) Spanish	56,815	2.1		< 5.0
(United Kingdom) British Isles origins (other)	52,900	2.0		< 5.0
(Iran) Iranian	45,540	1.7	Willowdale	12.1
**Total population**	**2,691,665**	**100**		

==== Community Councils ====
The top visible-minority groups per Community Council (2016 Census) are as follows:

- **Toronto & East York** (847,045): White: 65.3%, Chinese: 8.9%, South Asian: 6.7%, Black: 5.6%
- **North York** (638,100): White: 47.4%, Chinese: 14.0%, South Asian: 8.5%, Filipino: 8.0%, West Asian: 5.3%, Black: 5.2%
- **Scarborough** (623,135): White: 26.5%, South Asian: 25.4%, Chinese: 19.0%, Black: 10.8%, Filipino: 8.4%
- **Etobicoke York** (583,395): White: 48.9%, Black: 15.7%, South Asian: 11.9%, Latin American: 5.6%

The progression of the percentage of visible minorities in the aforementioned Community Councils (pre-1998-amalgamation municipalities or pairs thereof) has been far from uniform:

Community Council	1996	Percent change	2001	Percent change	2006	Percent change	2011	Total percent change (1996–2011)
**Toronto & East York**	**28.7%**	+3.9%	**32.6%**	+0.5%	**33.1%**	0.0%	**33.1%**	**+4.4%**
**Etobicoke York**	**31.1%**	+6.0%	**37.1%**	+3.4%	**40.5%**	+2.8%	**43.3%**	**+12.2%**
**North York**	**39.7%**	+2.9%	**42.6%**	+5.1%	**47.7%**	+3.5%	**51.2%**	**+11.5%**
**Scarborough**	**51.9%**	+8.1%	**60.0%**	+7.4%	**67.4%**	+2.9%	**70.3%**	**+18.4%**

==== Ridings ====
The finest granularity of visible minority data in Toronto readily available by the 2016 Census is that of the federal electoral district (riding; 2013 redistribution). The per-riding data based on the 2003 redistribution was available for the 2001 and 2006 censuses and the 2011 NHS, thus enabling useful comparisons. For instance, visible minorities as a percentage of the population only marginally increased, or even decreased (Toronto-Danforth, Parkdale-High Park, Toronto Centre, and, in the 2006–2011 period, Davenport) in the Old Toronto, East York and South Etobicoke ridings, while on the other hand increased significantly in Scarborough and North York. Since the 2016 Census used the then-new 2013 redistribution, such a direct comparison is no longer possible.

Visible Minorities as % of Population (2016 Census) & Top Ethnic Origins
Riding (2013 Redistribution)	Percentage	Most Populous Ethnic Origin	Percentage	Top Riding for Ethnic Origin (Percentage)	Most Populous Visible Minority	Percentage	Top Riding for Visible Minority (Percentage)
Parkdale-High Park	26.2	English	22.3	Irish (20.0); German (9.8); French (8.9)	Black	5.3	
Etobicoke Centre	27.1	**Italian**	**15.1**	Italian (15.1); Ukrainian (8.1)	South Asian	5.9	
Etobicoke-Lakeshore	27.7	English	17.1		South Asian	5.5	
Toronto-St. Paul's	28.3	English	18.5		Black	5.1	
Eglinton-Lawrence	31.8	Canadian	14.7	Polish (12.0)	Filipino	10.7	
Davenport	31.9	**Portuguese**	**22.7**	Portuguese (22.7)	Black	6.4	
University-Rosedale	32.7	English	20.6		Chinese	14.0	
Toronto-Danforth	32.8	English	22.9	Greek (7.3)	Chinese	12.3	
Beaches-East York	33.6	**English**	**24.2**	English (24.2); Canadian (19.7); Scottish (18.9)	South Asian	10.9	
Don Valley West	41.5	English	19.2	Pakistani (5.1)	South Asian	13.3	
Spadina-Fort York	42.8	English	16.4		Chinese	14.8	
York Centre	46.5	**Filipino**	**17.0**	Filipino (17.0); Russian (9.5); Jewish (5.6)	**Filipino**	**16.5**	Filipino (16.5)
Toronto Centre	49.7	English	15.7		South Asian	11.8	
York South-Weston	54.9	Portuguese	14.5		Black	23.2	
Scarborough Southwest	56.5	Canadian	16.2	Bangladeshi (5.0)	South Asian	21.6	
Don Valley East	58.4	East Indian	10.6		South Asian	17.1	
Willowdale	66.6	Chinese	25.9	Iranian (12.1); Korean (10.6)	Chinese	25.3	West Asian (10.9); Korean (10.3)
Scarborough Centre	69.8	Filipino	13.1		South Asian	25.6	
Don Valley North	70.4	Chinese	32.4		Chinese	31.3	
Scarborough-Guildwood	71.2	East Indian	18.0		**South Asian**	**33.2**	South Asian (33.2)
Scarborough-Rouge Park	72.4	East Indian	16.7	Sri Lankan (11.1)	South Asian	32.6	
Humber River-Black Creek	74.1	Italian	12.8	Jamaican (8.5); Vietnamese (8.0)	Black	22.8	Latin American (9.5); Southeast Asian (8.9)
Etobicoke North	75.7	**East Indian**	**22.2**	East Indian (22.2); Somali (5.4)	South Asian	28.9	Black (23.4)
Scarborough-Agincourt	80.6	**Chinese**	**47.0**	Chinese (47.0)	**Chinese**	**45.8**	Chinese (45.8)
Scarborough North	92.2	Chinese	46.6		Chinese	45.0	

Visible Minorities as % of Population
Riding (2003 Redistribution)	2011 NHS	2006 Census	2001 Census
Etobicoke-Lakeshore	23.8	20.8	19.1
Parkdale-High Park	25.6	26.1	26.8
St. Paul's	25.8	23.3	22.4
Etobicoke Centre	27.5	25.3	22.3
Eglinton-Lawrence	28.9	24.7	21.1
Beaches-East York	31.7	31.3	29.4
Toronto-Danforth	32.7	33.9	36.3
Davenport	33.0	33.2	31.6
Trinity-Spadina	37.2	36.5	35.3
Toronto Centre	40.8	41.0	41.3
York Centre	41.0	37.1	30.9
Don Valley West	46.0	43.1	39.4
Scarborough Southwest	51.4	48.4	43.4
York South-Weston	54.3	50.9	47.6
Don Valley East	59.4	57.0	53.7
Willowdale	63.7	59.8	50.8
Scarborough Centre	65.0	61.2	51.8
Scarborough-Guildwood	65.8	61.0	54.2
York West	72.2	68.0	62.8
Etobicoke North	72.9	71.0	63.2
Scarborough-Agincourt	78.8	76.7	69.3
Scarborough-Rouge River	91.0	89.7	84.6

Concentrations of ethnic groups per City of Toronto ridings (2016 Census) are as follows, with the largest proportion of each group in bold. For each of the federal electoral districts in the City of Toronto, the ethnic groups with 5 percent or more of population are shown, in a rough correspondence with community councils and pre-amalgamation municipalities (highest percentage for each ethnic group as well the most populous ethnic group in a riding, if a visible minority – are shown in bold):

TORONTO & EAST YORK

Riding	Population	Ethnic Group #1	%	Ethnic Group #2	%	Ethnic Group #3	%	Ethnic Group #4	%
Spadina-Fort York	114,315	White	56.3	Chinese	14.8	South Asian	8.3	Black	5.1
Beaches-East York	108,435	White	64.5	South Asian	10.9	Black	6.6	Chinese	5.7
Davenport	107,395	White	66.9	Black	6.4	Chinese	5.9	Latin American	5.4
Parkdale-High Park	106,445	**White**	**72.4**	Black	5.3				
Toronto-Danforth	105,395	White	65.5	Chinese	12.3	South Asian	5.4	Black	5.0
Toronto-St. Paul's	104,940	White	70.8	Black	5.1				
University-Rosedale	100,520	White	66.5	Chinese	14.0				
Toronto Centre	99,590	White	48.8	South Asian	11.8	Chinese	11.1	Black	9.1

NORTH YORK

Riding	Population	Ethnic Group #1	%	Ethnic Group #2	%	Ethnic Group #3	%	Ethnic Group #4	%	Ethnic Group #5	%	Ethnic Group #6	%
Willowdale	117,405	White	33.1	Chinese	25.3	**West Asian**	**10.9**	**Korean**	**10.3**	South Asian	5.9	Filipino	5.4
Eglinton-Lawrence	112,925	White	67.7	Filipino	10.7	Black	5.5						
Don Valley North	109,060	**Chinese**	**31.3**	White	29.4	South Asian	10.2	West Asian	7.6				
Humber River-Black Creek	107,725	White	25.4	Black	22.8	**Latin American**	**9.5**	**Southeast Asian**	**8.9**	Filipino	5.5		
York Centre	103,760	White	53.1	**Filipino**	**16.5**	Black	7.9	Latin American	5.1				
Don Valley West	101,790	White	57.9	South Asian	13.3	Chinese	10.6						
Don Valley East	93,170	White	40.9	South Asian	17.1	Black	9.3	Chinese	7.5	Filipino	7.4	West Asian	5.5

SCARBOROUGH

Riding	Population	Ethnic Group #1	%	Ethnic Group #2	%	Ethnic Group #3	%	Ethnic Group #4	%	Ethnic Group #5	%
Scarborough Centre	110,450	White	29.4	South Asian	25.6	Filipino	12.5	Black	9.6	Chinese	9.3
Scarborough Southwest	108,295	White	42.0	South Asian	21.6	Black	11.2	Filipino	9.0	Chinese	5.8
Scarborough-Agincourt	104,225	**Chinese**	**45.8**	White	19.1	South Asian	14.0	Black	6.3	Filipino	5.4
Scarborough-Rouge Park	101,445	**South Asian**	**32.6**	White	26.8	Black	15.9	Filipino	8.7		
Scarborough-Guildwood	101,115	**South Asian**	**33.2**	White	27.6	Black	14.3	Filipino	7.9	Chinese	5.4
Scarborough North	97,610	**Chinese**	**45.0**	South Asian	26.1	Black	7.6	White	7.6	Filipino	6.4

ETOBICOKE & YORK

Riding	Population	Ethnic Group #1	%	Ethnic Group #2	%	Ethnic Group #3	%	Ethnic Group #4	%	Ethnic Group #5	%
**Etobicoke-Lakeshore**	127,520	White	71.3	South Asian	5.5	Black	5.0				
**Etobicoke North**	116,960	**South Asian**	**28.9**	White	23.8	**Black**	**23.4**				
**Etobicoke Centre**	116,055	White	72.3	South Asian	5.9	Black	5.9				
**York South-Weston**	115,130	White	44.2	Black	23.2	Latin American	8.5	Filipino	5.9	South Asian	5.7

For each of the federal electoral districts in the City of Toronto, the ethnic origin groups with 7 percent of more of population are shown, in a rough correspondence with community councils and pre-amalgamation municipalities (highest percentage for each ethnic group as well the most populous ethnic group in a riding – if not Canadian or English, which are the most frequent ones – are shown in bold):

TORONTO & EAST YORK

Riding	Population	Ethnic Origin #1	%	Ethnic Origin #2	%	Ethnic Origin #3	%	Ethnic Origin #4	%	Ethnic Origin #5	%	Ethnic Origin #6	%	Ethnic Origin #7	%	Ethnic Origin #8	%	Ethnic Origin #9	%
Spadina-Fort York	114,315	English	16.4	Chinese	16.0	Irish	14.6	Canadian	14.0	Scottish	13.2	French	7.7	German	7.6				
Beaches-East York	108,435	**English**	**24.2**	Irish	19.9	**Canadian**	**19.7**	**Scottish**	**18.9**	French	8.7	German	8.4						
Davenport	107,395	**Portuguese**	**22.7**	English	13.6	Canadian	12.8	Irish	11.5	Italian	11.1	Scottish	11.0						
Parkdale-High Park	106,445	English	22.3	**Irish**	**20.0**	Scottish	18.7	Canadian	16.1	**German**	**9.8**	**French**	**8.88**	Polish	8.5				
Toronto-Danforth	105,395	English	22.9	Irish	19.5	Scottish	18.7	Canadian	18.4	Chinese	13.8	French	8.86	German	8.8	**Greek**	**7.3**		
Toronto-St. Paul's	104,940	English	18.5	Canadian	16.1	Irish	15.2	Scottish	14.8	Polish	10.3	German	7.9	Russian	7.7	Italian	7.3	French	7.2
University-Rosedale	100,520	English	20.6	Irish	16.6	Scottish	16.3	Canadian	15.2	Chinese	14.7	German	8.7	French	7.7	Italian	7.4		
Toronto Centre	99,590	English	15.7	Canadian	13.7	Irish	13.4	Scottish	12.6	Chinese	12.5	French	7.2						

NORTH YORK

Riding	Population	Ethnic Origin #1	%	Ethnic Origin #2	%	Ethnic Origin #3	%	Ethnic Origin #4	%	Ethnic Origin #5	%	Ethnic Origin #6	%	Ethnic Origin #7	%	Ethnic Origin #8	%
Willowdale	117,405	**Chinese**	**25.9**	**Iranian**	**12.1**	**Korean**	**10.6**										
Eglinton-Lawrence	112,925	Canadian	14.7	English	12.6	**Polish**	**12.0**	Filipino	11.0	Scottish	9.7	Italian	9.5	Irish	9.2	Russian	8.4
Don Valley North	109,060	**Chinese**	**32.4**	East Indian	7.3	Iranian	7.3										
Humber River-Black Creek	107,725	**Italian**	**12.8**	East Indian	9.2	**Jamaican**	**8.5**	**Vietnamese**	**8.0**	Canadian	7.4						
York Centre	103,760	**Filipino**	**17.0**	Italian	13.4	**Russian**	**9.5**	Canadian	8.6								
Don Valley West	101,790	English	19.2	Canadian	15.1	Scottish	14.9	Irish	14.2	Chinese	11.2						
Don Valley East	93,170	**East Indian**	**10.6**	Canadian	10.4	English	10.1	Chinese	8.9	Irish	8.1	Scottish	8.0	Filipino	7.8		

SCARBOROUGH

Riding	Population	Ethnic Origin #1	%	Ethnic Origin #2	%	Ethnic Origin #3	%	Ethnic Origin #4	%	Ethnic Origin #5	%	Ethnic Origin #6	%	Ethnic Origin #7	%	Ethnic Origin #8	%
Scarborough Centre	110,450	**Filipino**	**13.1**	East Indian	12.2	Canadian	11.2	Chinese	10.7	English	7.8	Sri Lankan	7.0				
Scarborough Southwest	108,295	Canadian	16.2	English	14.3	Irish	11.5	Scottish	10.9	Filipino	9.5	East Indian	8.2	Chinese	7.2		
Scarborough-Agincourt	104,225	**Chinese**	**47.0**	East Indian	7.4												
Scarborough-Rouge Park	101,445	**East Indian**	**16.7**	Canadian	11.8	**Sri Lankan**	**11.1**	English	9.8	Filipino	9.3	Jamaican	8.4	Scottish	7.2	Irish	7.0
Scarborough-Guildwood	101,115	**East Indian**	**18.0**	Canadian	11.6	English	9.7	Filipino	8.5	Sri Lankan	7.8	Chinese	7.1	Scottish	7.0		
Scarborough North	97,610	**Chinese**	**46.6**	East Indian	11.8	Sri Lankan	9.4										

ETOBICOKE & YORK

Riding	Population	Ethnic Origin #1	%	Ethnic Origin #2	%	Ethnic Origin #3	%	Ethnic Origin #4	%	Ethnic Origin #5	%	Ethnic Origin #6	%	Ethnic Origin #7	%	Ethnic Origin #8	%
**Etobicoke-Lakeshore**	127,520	English	17.1	Canadian	15.9	Irish	14.4	Scottish	13.5	Polish	9.2	Italian	9.1	Ukrainian	7.6	German	7.1
**Etobicoke North**	116,960	**East Indian**	**22.2**	Canadian	7.9												
**Etobicoke Centre**	116,055	**Italian**	**15.1**	English	14.3	Canadian	12.1	Irish	10.8	Scottish	10.4	**Ukrainian**	**8.1**	Polish	7.4		
**York South-Weston**	115,130	**Portuguese**	**14.5**	Italian	12.8	Canadian	8.7	Jamaican	8.4								

==== Wards ====
Top ethnic origin per Toronto ward (as designated by the City of Toronto; 2011 Census data – total responses)

- English (18): Ward 32 – Beaches-East York (15.2%), Ward 13 – Parkdale-High Park (12.9%), Ward 22 – St. Paul's (12.9%), Ward 36 – Scarborough Southwest (12.8%), [...]
- Chinese (7): Ward 41 – Scarborough-Rouge Park (52.0%), Ward 39 – Scarborough-Agincourt (49.0%), Ward 24 – Willowdale (27.0%), Ward 40 – Scarborough-Agincourt (22.6%)
- East Indian (7): Ward 1 – Etobicoke North (23.4%), Ward 42 – Scarborough-Rouge Park (15.9%), Ward 38 – Scarborough Centre (13.1%), Ward 2 – Etobicoke North (11.8%)
- Italian (4): Ward 9 – York Centre (21.9%), Ward 12 – York South-Weston (15.1%), Ward 7 – York West (14.3%), Ward 4 - Etobicoke Centre (11.8%)
- Portuguese (2): Ward 17 - Davenport (19.7%), Ward 18 - Davenport (16.4%)
- Jewish (2): Ward 10 - York Centre (15.0%), Ward 21 - St. Paul's (10.6%)
- Filipino (2): Ward 15 - Eglinton-Lawrence (10.0%), Ward 35 - Scarborough Southwest (8.7%)
- Canadian (2): Ward 37 - Scarborough Centre (8.6%), Ward 11 - York South-Weston (7.4%)

==== Neighbourhoods ====
Top ethnic origin per Toronto neighbourhood (as designated by the City of Toronto; 2006 Census data - total responses)

- English (59): Leaside-Bennington (40%), The Beaches (39%), Rosedale-Moore Park (36%), Kingsway South (35%), [...]
- Chinese (23): Steeles (70%), Milliken (65%), Agincourt North (56%), Agincourt South-Malvern West (47.1%), [...]
- Italian (15): Maple Leaf (45%), Humber Summit (34.5%), Pelmo Park-Humberlea (34.2%), Yorkdale-Glen Park (33.6%), [...]
- Indian (15): West Humber-Clairville (33%), Mount Olive-Silverstone-Jamestown (30%), Thorncliffe Park (24%), Woburn (22%), [...]
- Jewish (10): Forest Hill North (32%), Westminster-Branson (31%), Forest Hill South (29%), Bedford Park-Nortown (28%), [...]
- Portuguese (9): Little Portugal (38%), Caledonia-Fairbank (37%), Weston-Pellam Park (34%), Keelesdale-Eglinton West (32%), [...]
- Filipino (3): North St. James Town (17%), Ionview (16%), Kennedy Park (13%)
- Jamaican (3): Beechborough-Greenbrook (15%), Black Creek (10.0%), Mount Dennis (9.7%)
- Canadian (2): New Toronto (21%), Alderwood (19%)
- Greek (1): Broadview North (15%)

The neighbourhoods with the highest percentage of visible minorities (2016 Census data) are as follows:

- Milliken: 97% (top ethnic origin: Chinese)
- Steeles: 91% (top ethnic origin: Chinese)
- Agincourt North: 91% (top ethnic origin: Chinese)
- Malvern: 90% (top ethnic origin: East Indian)
- West Humber-Clairville: 87% (top ethnic origin: East Indian)
- Mount Olive-Silverstone-Jamestown: 87% (top ethnic origin: East Indian)
- Agincourt South-Malvern West: 86% (top ethnic origin: Chinese)
- Black Creek: 81% (top ethnic origin: Vietnamese)
- Rouge: 81% (top ethnic origin: East Indian)
- Flemingdon Park: 79% (top ethnic origin: East Indian)
- Thorncliffe Park: 79% (top ethnic origin: Pakistani)

Those with the lowest percentage of visible minorities (2016 data) are:

- Kingsway South: 12% (top ethnic origin: English)
- Markland Wood: 13% (top ethnic origin: English)
- The Beaches: 14% (top ethnic origin: English)
- Runnymede-Bloor West Village: 16% (top ethnic origin: English)
- Casa Loma: 17% (top ethnic origin: English)
- Forest Hill South: 17% (top ethnic origin: Polish)
- Lawrence Park South: 17% (top ethnic origin: English)
- Stonegate-Queensway: 18% (top ethnic origin: English)
- Leaside-Bennington: 18% (top ethnic origin: English)
- Rosedale-Moore Park: 18% (top ethnic origin: English)

=== Toronto CMA ===
It was estimated that prior to the World War II, 80% of metropolitan Toronto was British, but had declined to around 47% by 1981.

Panethnic groups in Toronto CMA (1981−2021)
Panethnic group	2021		2016		2011		2006		2001		1996		1981	
Panethnic group	Pop.	%	Pop.	%	Pop.	%	Pop.	%	Pop.	%	Pop.	%	Pop.	%
European (Note: 2001–2016: Statistic includes all persons that did not make up part of a visible minority or an indigenous identity. 2021: Statistic includes all persons belonging to the non-indigenous and non-visible minority “White” population group.)	2,598,670	42.3%	2,804,630	47.84%	2,887,825	52.3%	2,871,430	56.61%	2,915,125	62.72%	—N/a	—N/a	—N/a	—N/a
South Asian	1,182,485	19.25%	973,225	16.6%	833,085	15.09%	684,070	13.49%	473,810	10.19%	—N/a	—N/a	—N/a	—N/a
East Asian	774,145	12.6%	721,375	12.3%	612,950	11.1%	560,605	11.05%	469,575	10.1%	—N/a	—N/a	—N/a	—N/a
Black	488,155	7.95%	442,020	7.54%	397,175	7.19%	352,220	6.94%	310,500	6.68%	—N/a	—N/a	—N/a	—N/a
Southeast Asian	383,480	6.24%	338,010	5.77%	321,065	5.82%	242,195	4.78%	187,240	4.03%	—N/a	—N/a	—N/a	—N/a
Middle Eastern	289,645	4.72%	229,370	3.91%	171,640	3.11%	128,905	2.54%	95,810	2.06%	—N/a	—N/a	—N/a	—N/a
Latin American	156,460	2.55%	132,945	2.27%	117,005	2.12%	99,295	1.96%	75,915	1.63%	—N/a	—N/a	—N/a	—N/a
Indigenous	44,635	0.73%	46,320	0.79%	36,990	0.67%	26,575	0.52%	20,300	0.44%	—N/a	—N/a	—N/a	—N/a
Other/Multiracial	226,910	3.69%	174,970	2.98%	143,500	2.6%	106,780	2.11%	99,695	2.14%	—N/a	—N/a	—N/a	—N/a
Total: Visible minority	3,501,280	57%	3,011,915	51.37%	2,596,420	47.03%	2,174,070	42.86%	1,712,545	36.85%	1,338,095	31.61%	404,790	13.6%
Total responses	6,142,885	99.04%	5,862,855	98.9%	5,521,235	98.89%	5,072,075	99.2%	4,647,955	99.25%	—N/a	—N/a	—N/a	—N/a
Total population	6,202,225	100%	5,928,040	100%	5,583,064	100%	5,113,149	100%	4,682,897	100%	—N/a	—N/a	—N/a	—N/a
Note: Totals greater than 100% due to multiple origin responses

Distribution of visible minority groups in the Toronto CMA in the 2021 census.
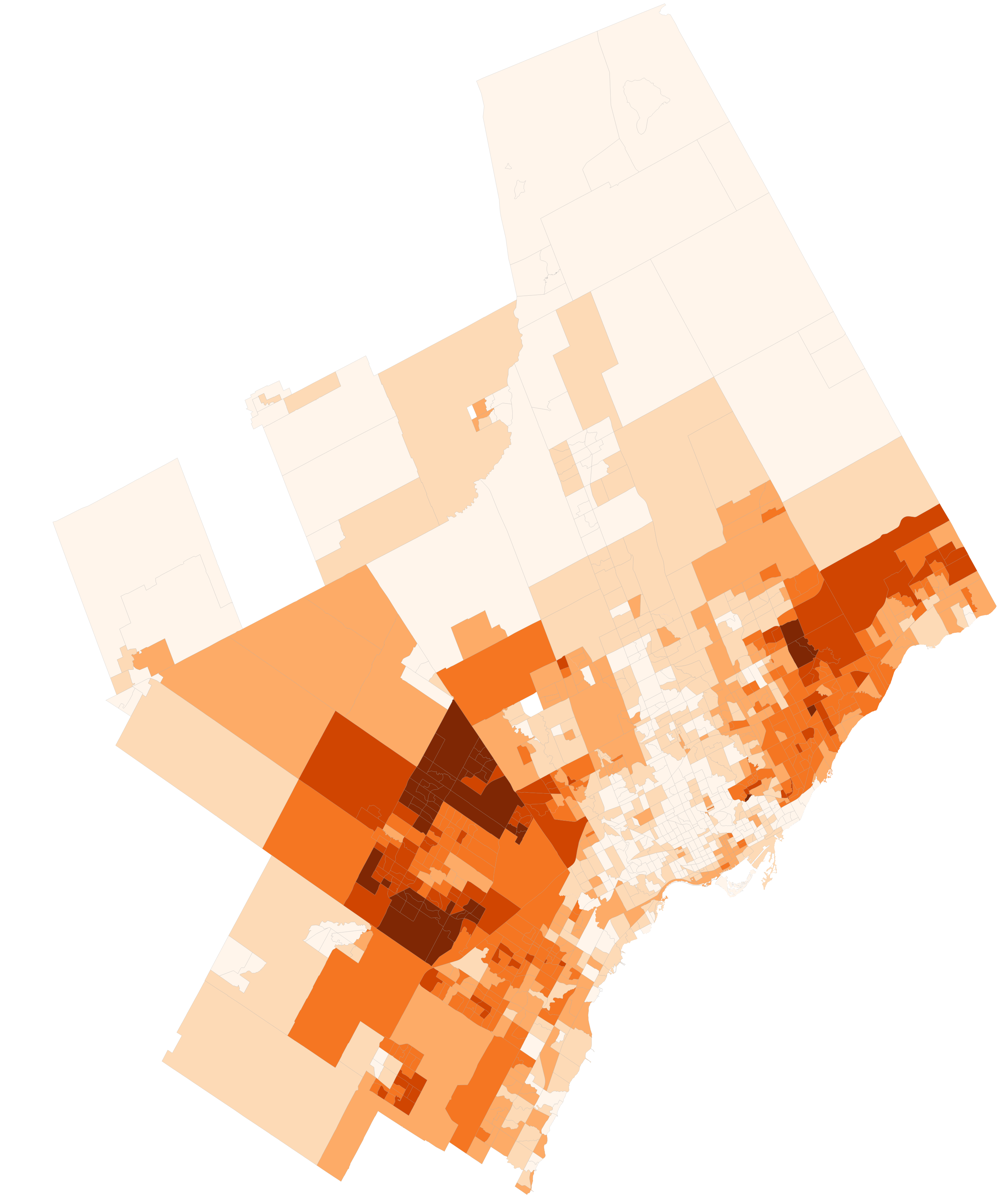
South Asians

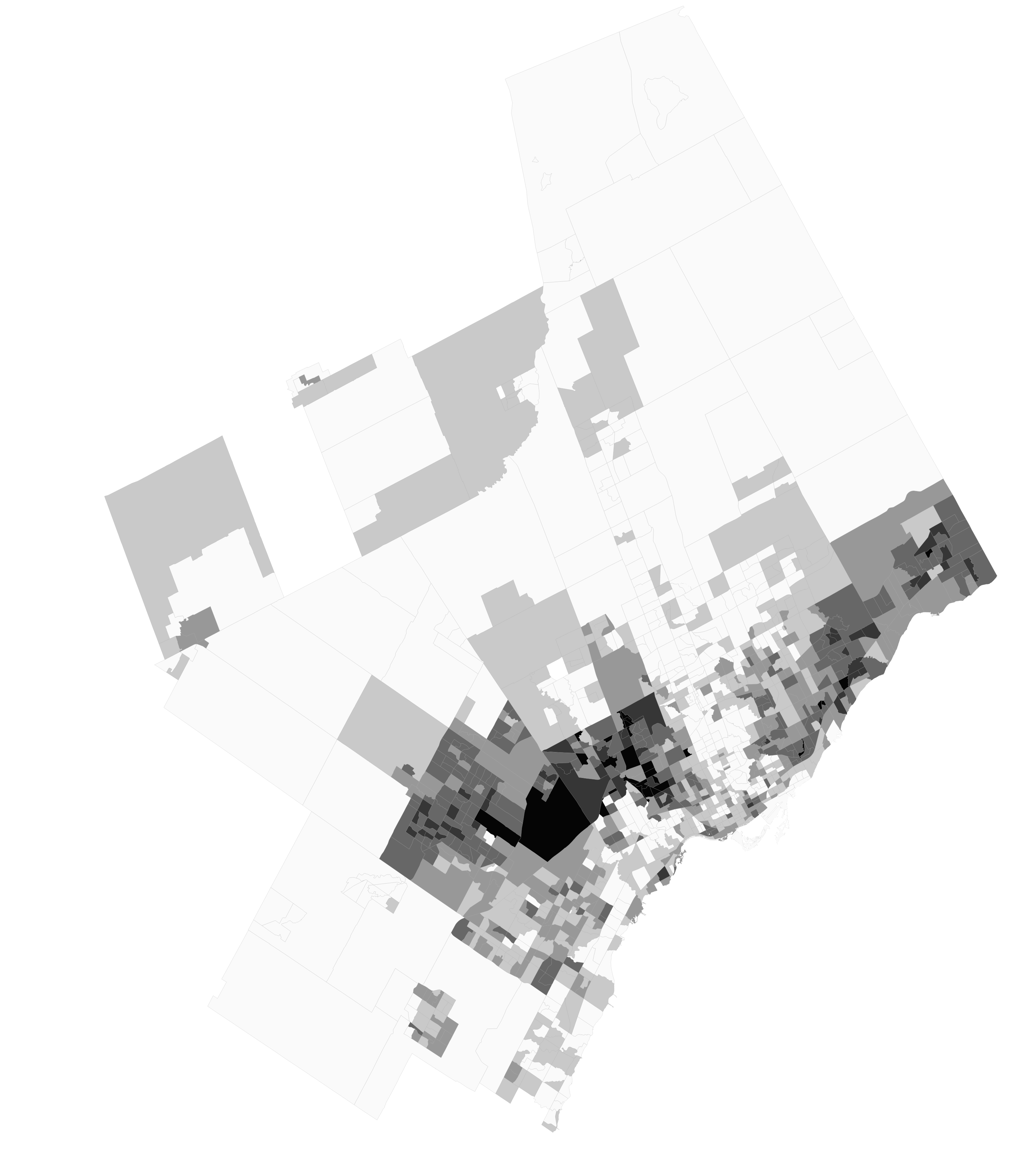
Black

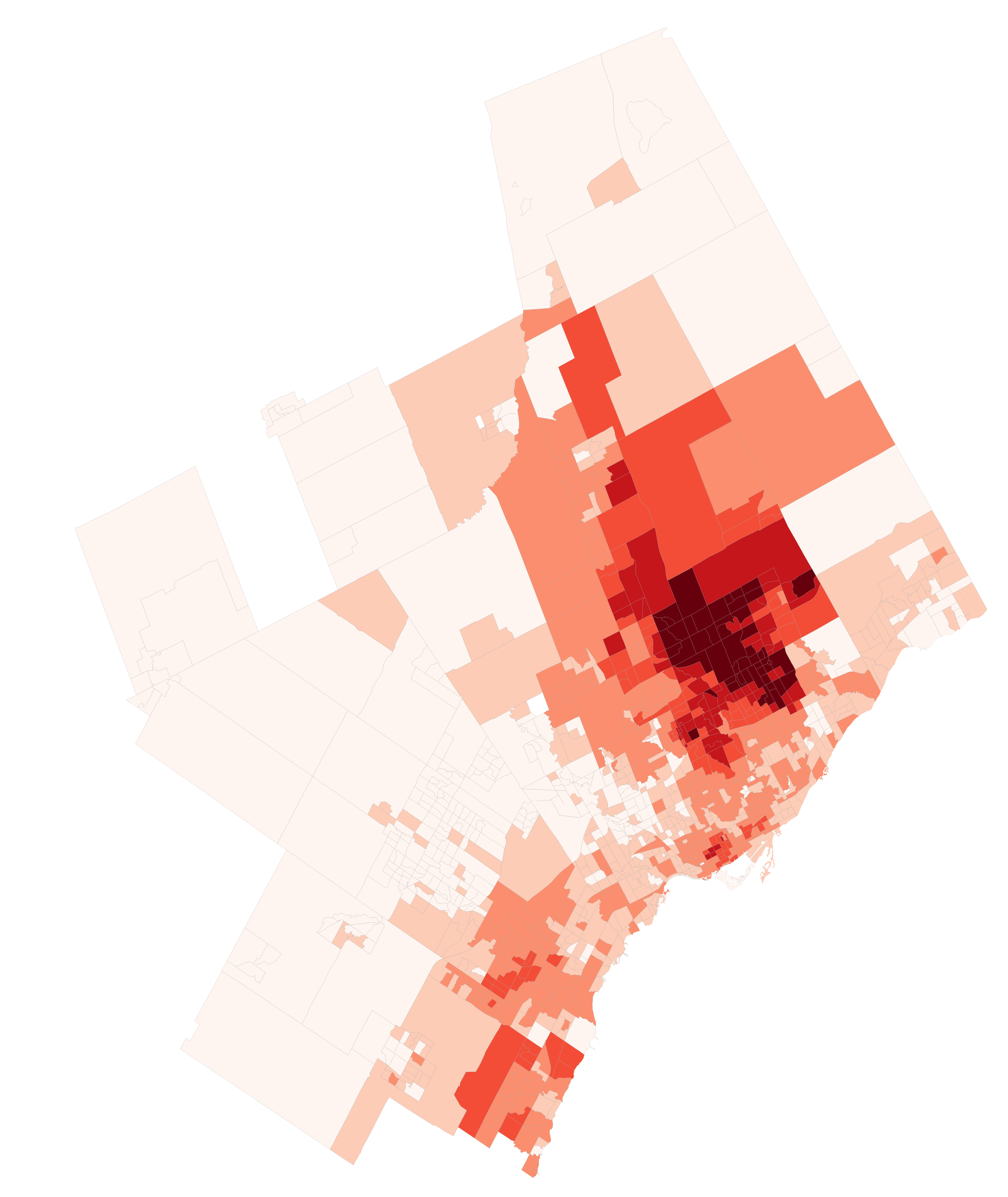
Chinese

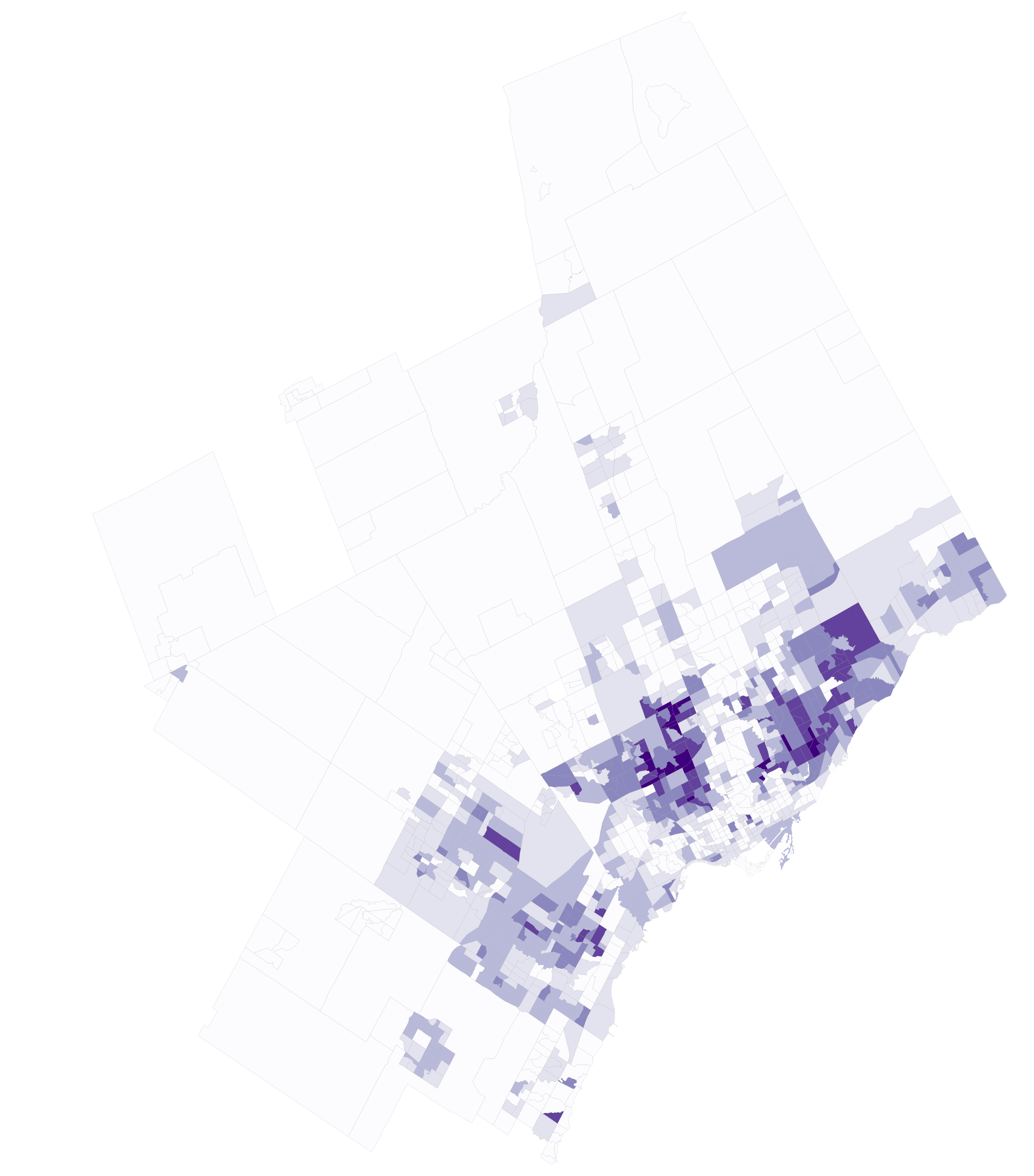
Filipinos

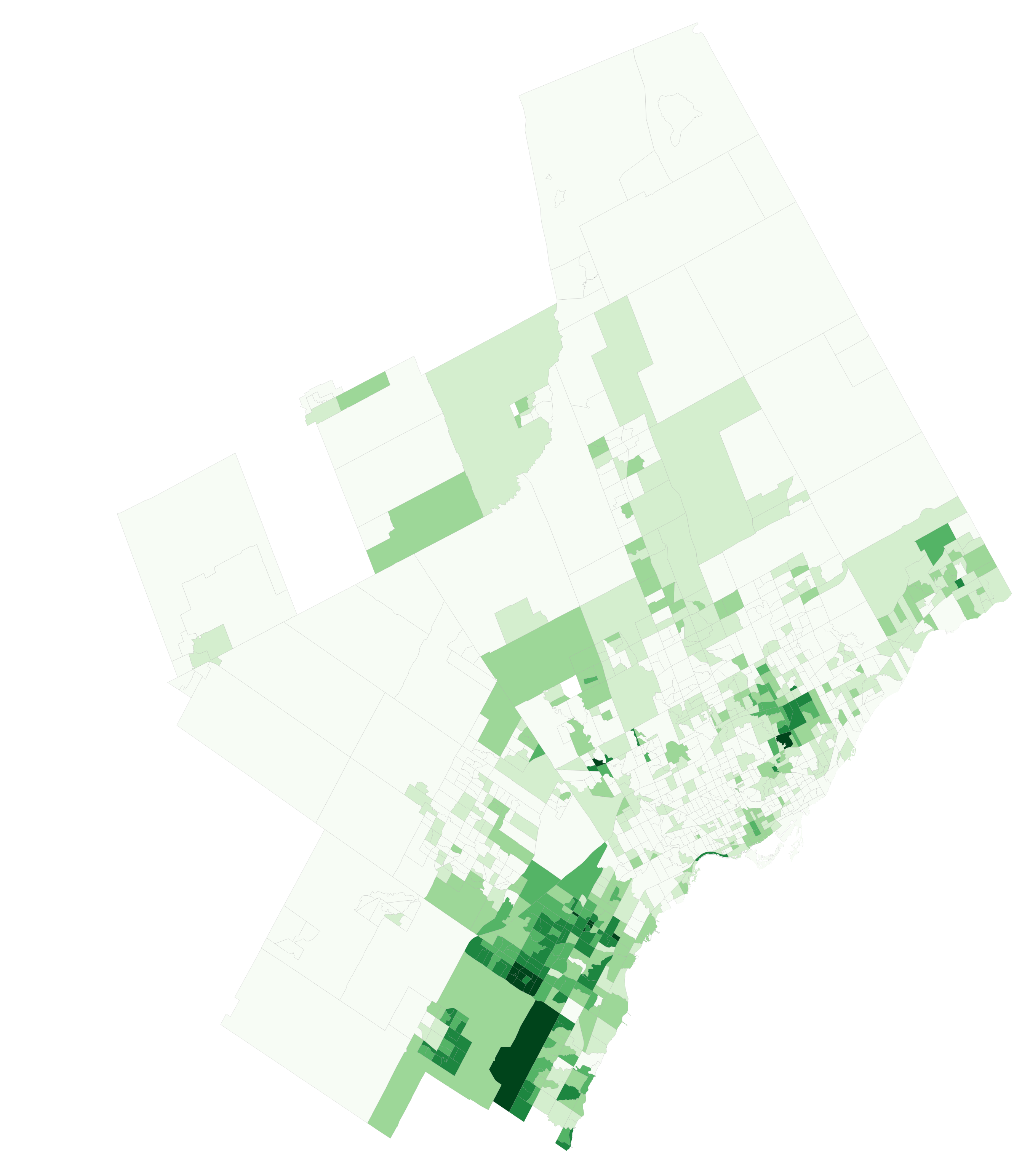
Arabs

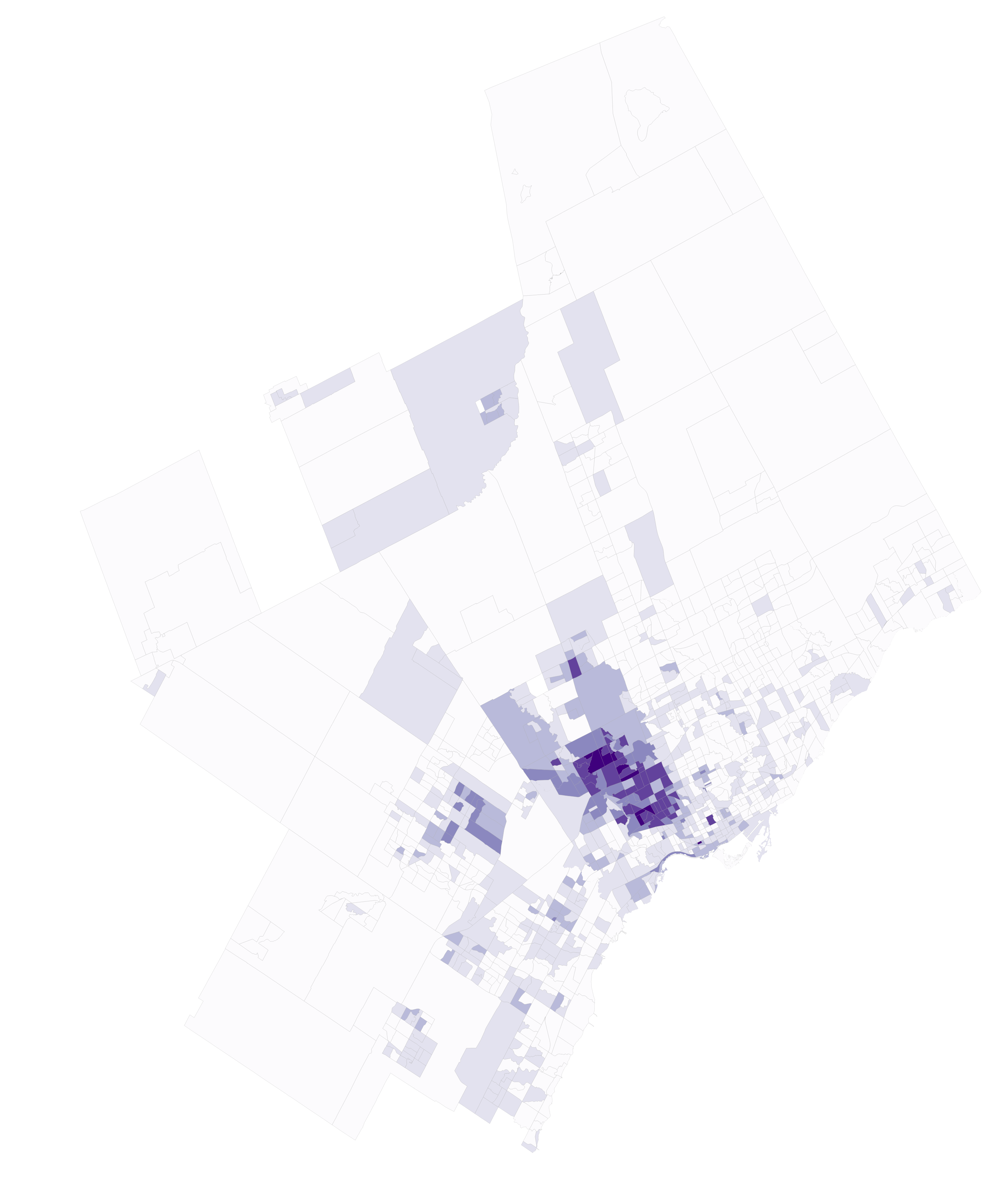
Latin Americans

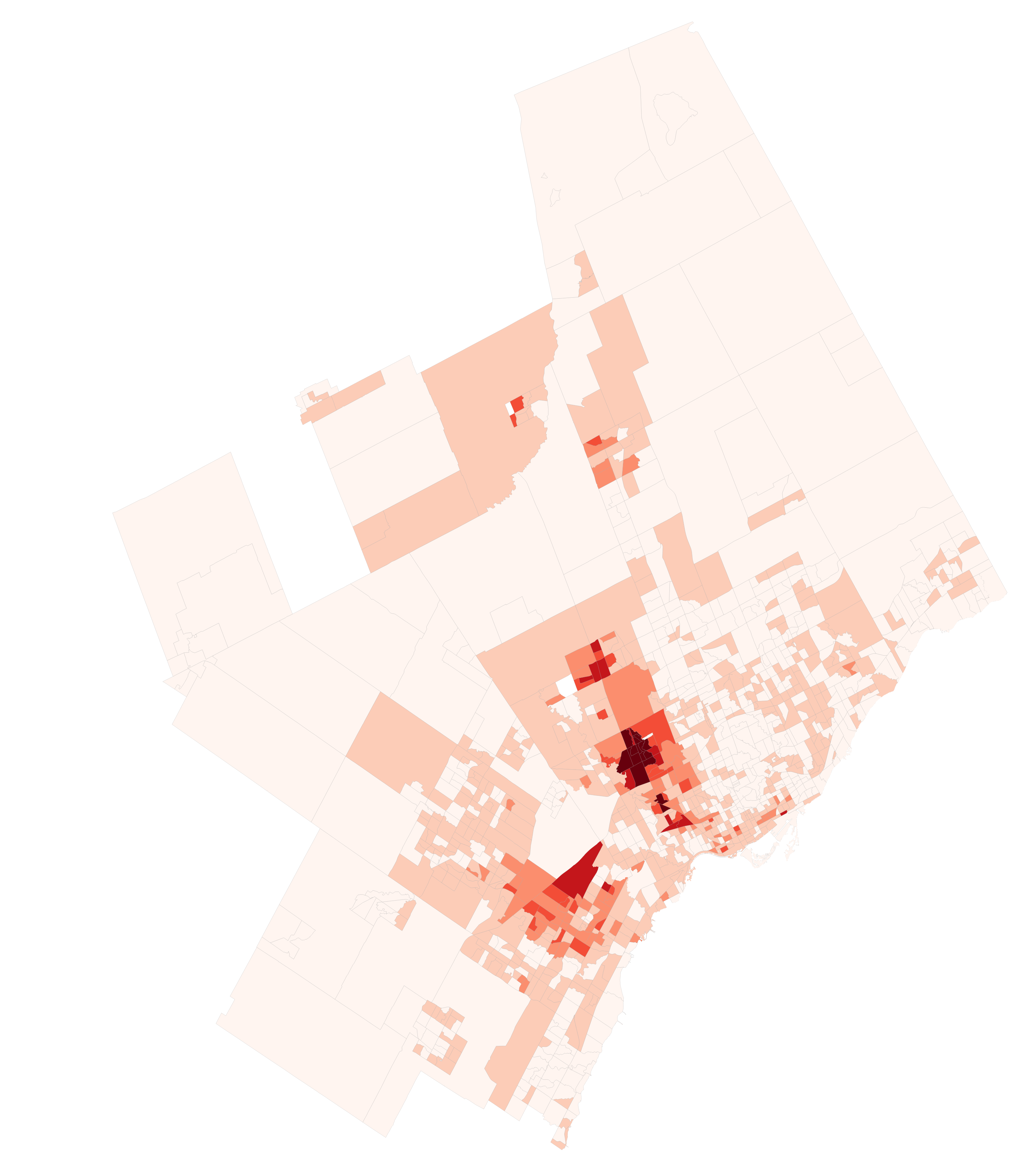
Southeast Asians (excluding Filipinos)

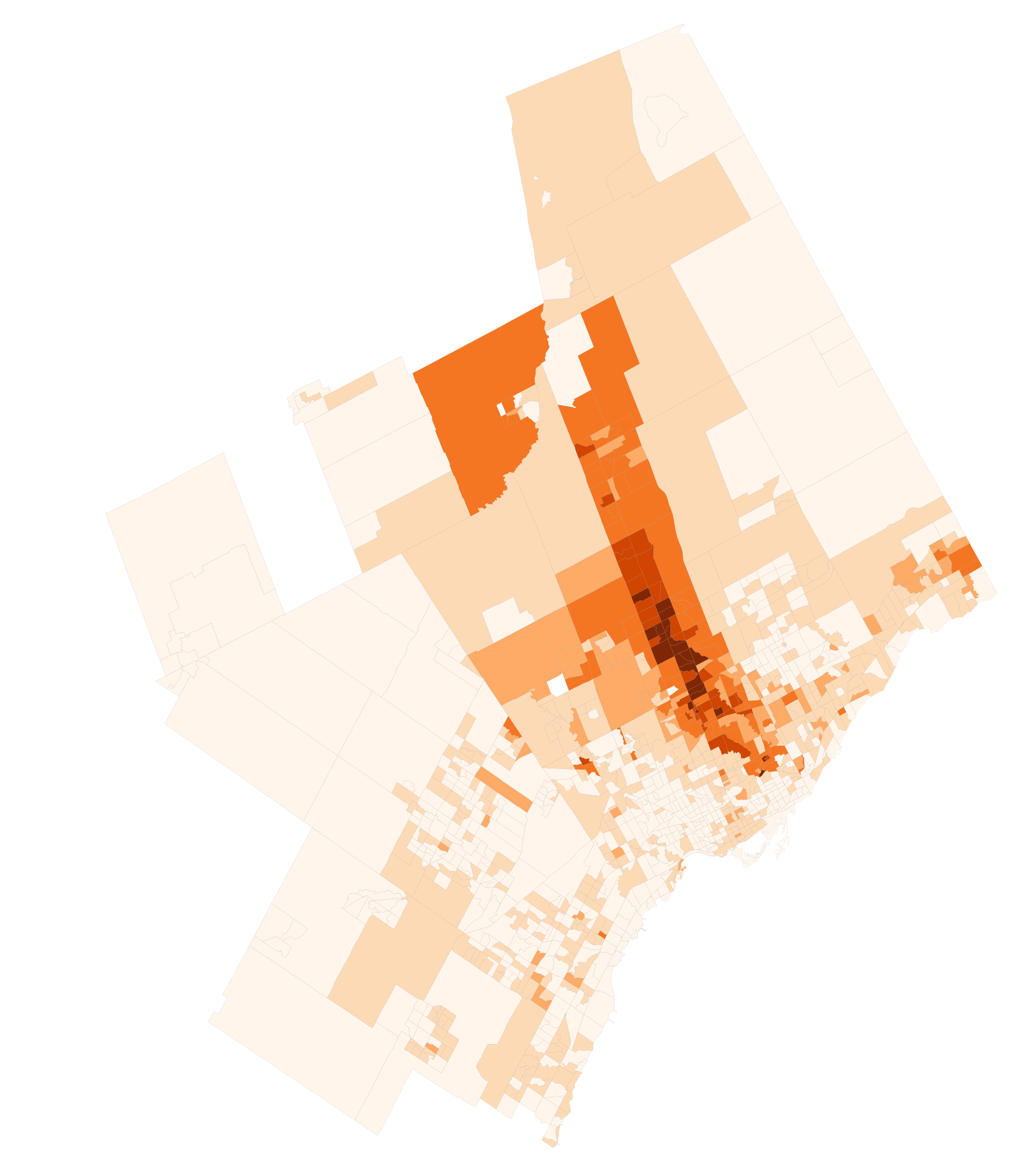
West Asians (excluding Arabs)

Visible minority population in the Toronto CMA
Year	Pop.	%
2021	3,501,275	57%
2016	3,011,905	51.4%
2011	2,596,420	47%
2006	2,174,070	42.9%
2001	1,712,530	36.8%
1996	1,338,095	31.6%
1991	997,500	25.8%
1986	586,500	17.3%
1981	404,790	13.6%

The following are the twenty (20) more common ethnic origins in the Toronto CMA:

Top 20 Ethnic Origins in the Toronto CMA, 2016	Population (2016)	Percentage	Municipality with Highest Concentration	Percentage	Riding with Highest Concentration	Percentage
(Canada) Canadian	746,960	12.7	Georgina	36.3	Simcoe—Grey [New Tecumseth only]	31.7
(England) English	732,555	12.5	Uxbridge	40.3	Simcoe—Grey [New Tecumseth only]	33.1
(China) Chinese	700,705	12.0	Markham	46.5	Markham—Unionville	65.6
(India) East Indian	643,370	11.0	Brampton	33.4	Brampton East	51.4
(Republic of Ireland) Irish	544,380	9.3	New Tecumseth	24.8	Simcoe—Grey [New Tecumseth only]	24.8
(Scotland) Scottish	543,760	9.3	Uxbridge	26.4	Wellington—Halton Hills [Halton Hills only]	24.1
(Italy) Italian	484,360	8.3	King	34.5	Vaughan--Woodbridge	53.5
(Philippines) Filipino	274,675	4.7	Toronto	6.0	York Centre	17.0
(Germany) German	271,815	4.6	Uxbridge	12.9	Wellington--Halton Hills [Halton Hills only]	10.4
(France) French	247,790	4.2	Georgina	10.3	Wellington--Halton Hills [Halton Hills only]	9.4
(Poland) Polish	237,240	4.0	Mississauga	6.1	Thornhill	12.6
(Portugal) Portuguese	210,420	3.6	Bradford West Gwillimbury	11.8	Davenport	22.7
(Jamaica) Jamaican	200,335	3.4	Ajax	9.2	Brampton West	11.3
(Ukraine) Ukrainian	144,335	2.4	Oakville	3.6	Etobicoke Centre	8.1
(Russia) Russian	139,910	2.4	Vaughan	8.4	Thornhill	16.4
(Pakistan) Pakistani	122,950	2.1	Milton	7.2	Milton	7.2
(Sri Lanka) Sri Lankan	114,400	2.0	Ajax	4.4	Scarborough-Rouge Park	11.1
(United Kingdom) British Isles origins (other)	107,900	1.8	Uxbridge	5.8		< 5.0
(Spain) Spanish	106,685	1.8	Oakville	2.0		< 5.0
(Greece) Greek	99,145	1.7	Whitchurch-Stoufville	3.8	Toronto-Danforth	7.3
**Total population**	**5,862,855**	**100**				

The top 20 ethnic origins in the Toronto CMA, from 1996 to 2016 are as follows:

Top 20 Ethnic Origins in the Toronto CMA, 2016	Population	%	2011	Population	%	2006	Population	%	2001	Population	%	1996	Population	%
(Canada) Canadian	746,960	12.7	English	777,110	14.1	English	804,100	15.9	Canadian	861,945	18.5	English	891,735	21.1
(England) English	732,555	12.5	Canadian	728,745	13.2	Canadian	651,635	12.8	English	783,770	16.9	Canadian	710,755	16.8
(China) Chinese	700,705	12.0	Chinese	594,735	10.8	Scottish	561,050	11.1	Scottish	517,115	11.1	Scottish	534,595	12.6
(India) East Indian	643,370	11.0	East Indian	572,250	10.4	Chinese	537,060	10.6	Irish	487,215	10.4	Irish	480,980	11.4
(Republic of Ireland) Irish	544,380	9.3	Scottish	545,365	9.9	Irish	531,865	10.5	Chinese	435,685	9.4	Italian	414,310	9.8
(Scotland) Scottish	543,760	9.3	Irish	543,600	9.8	East Indian	484,655	9.6	Italian	429,385	9.2	Chinese	359,450	8.5
(Italy) Italian	484,360	8.3	Italian	475,090	8.6	Italian	466,155	9.2	East Indian	345,855	7.4	East Indian	255,685	6.0
(Philippines) Filipino	274,675	4.7	German	262,830	4.8	German	259,015	5.1	French	220,535	4.7	French	236,315	5.6
(Germany) German	271,815	4.6	French	249,375	4.5	French	241,395	4.8	German	220,140	4.7	German	224,525	5.3
(France) French	247,790	4.2	Filipino	246,345	4.5	Polish	207,495	4.1	Portuguese	171,545	3.7	Portuguese	161,685	3.8
(Poland) Polish	237,240	4.0	Polish	214,455	3.9	Portuguese	188,110	3.7	Polish	166,695	3.6	Polish	161,005	3.8
(Portugal) Portuguese	210,420	3.6	Portuguese	196,975	3.6	Filipino	181,330	3.6	Jewish	161,215	3.5	Jewish	156,300	3.7
(Jamaica) Jamaican	200,335	3.4	Jamaican	177,305	3.2	Jamaican	160,205	3.2	Jamaican	150,840	3.2	Jamaican	133,690	3.2
(Ukraine) Ukrainian	144,335	2.4	Jewish	137,165	2.5	Jewish	141,685	2.8	Filipino	140,405	3.0	Filipino	102,525	2.4
(Russia) Russian	139,910	2.4	Ukrainian	130,350	2.4	Ukrainian	122,510	2.4	Ukrainian	104,485	2.2	Ukrainian	95,500	2.3
(Pakistan) Pakistani	122,950	2.1	Russian	118,090	2.1	Russian	102,815	2.0	Dutch (Netherlands)	85,860	1.8	Dutch (Netherlands)	85,250	2.0
(Sri Lanka) Sri Lankan	114,400	2.0	Spanish	105,740	1.9	Spanish	97,255	1.9	Greek	85,375	1.8	Greek	80,330	1.9
(United Kingdom) British Isles origins (other)	107,900	1.8	Sri Lankan	104,980	1.9	Dutch (Netherlands)	95,560	1.9	Spanish	65,600	1.4	Spanish	62,520	1.5
(Spain) Spanish	106,685	1.8	British Isles origins (other)	104,070	1.9	Greek	90,585	1.8	Russian	62,540	1.3	Hungarian (Magyar)	44,160	1.1
(Greece) Greek	99,145	1.7	Dutch (Netherlands)	98,925	1.8	Sri Lankan	80,610	1.6	Hungarian (Magyar)	46,790	1.0	Welsh	44,015	1.0
**Total population**	**5,862,855**	**100**	**Total population**	**5,521,235**	**100**	**Total population**	**5,072,075**	**100**	**Total population**	**4,647,955**	**100**	**Total population**	**4,232,905**	**100**

Change between 2011 and 2016:

Largest increases:

1. **Chinese: +105,970 (+1.2%)**
2. East Indian: +71,120 (+0.6%)
3. Pakistani: +32,340 (+0.5%)
4. Filipino: +28,330 (+0.2%)
5. Jamaican: +23,030 (+0.2%)
6. Polish: +22,785 (+0.1%)
7. Russian: +21,820 (+0.3%)
8. Iranian: +20,845 (+0.3%)
9. Canadian: +18,215 (−0.5%)
10. Ukrainian: +13,985 (–)

Largest decreases:

1. **Jewish: −77,970 (−1.5%)**
2. English: −44,555 (−1.6%)
3. Yugoslavian, n.o.s.: −1,900 (−0.4%)
4. Scottish: −1,605 (−0.6%)
5. French: −1,585 (−0.3%)

==== Cities ====
Concentrations of ethnic groups per Toronto CMA municipality are as follows, with the largest proportion of each group in bold (only percentages higher than 5% are included):

Municipality	Population (2016)	Ethnic Group #1	%	Ethnic Group #2	%	Ethnic Group #3	%	Ethnic Group #4	%	Ethnic Group #5	%	Ethnic Group #6	%
Toronto	2,691,665	White	47.7	South Asian	12.6	Chinese	11.1	Black	8.9	**Filipino**	**5.7**		
Mississauga	715,475	White	42.3	South Asian	23.2	Chinese	7.6	Black	6.6	Filipino	5.1	**Arab**	**5.1**
Brampton	590,950	**South Asian**	**44.3**	White	26.0	Black	13.9						
Markham	327,400	**Chinese**	**45.1**	White	21.8	South Asian	17.8						
Vaughan	304,145	White	64.4	South Asian	10.1	Chinese	6.8						
Richmond Hill	193,800	White	39.8	Chinese	29.4	**West Asian**	**10.4**	South Asian	7.7				
Oakville	191,720	White	68.4	South Asian	8.9	Chinese	7.0						
Ajax	119,180	White	42.3	South Asian	20.9	**Black**	**16.7**						
Milton	108,935	White	56.3	South Asian	21.0								
Pickering	90,995	White	55.9	South Asian	15.2	Black	10.8						
Newmarket	82,730	White	72.6	Chinese	6.8								
Caledon	66,215	White	80.3	South Asian	10.0								
Halton Hills	60,195	White	90.9										
Aurora	54,705	White	72.4	Chinese	10.2								
Whitchurch-Stouffville	45,345	White	62.3	Chinese	13.1	South Asian	12.4						
Georgina	44,765	White	91.8										
Bradford West Gwillimbury	34,965	White	77.9	South Asian	5.5								
New Tecumseth	33,735	White	90.4										
King	24,365	White	86.7										
East Gwillimbury	23,435	White	87.2										
Uxbridge	20,975	**White**	**92.5**										

Most common ethnic origins (only percentages higher than 7% are included) per Toronto CMA municipality are as follows, with the largest proportion of each ethnic origin in bold (as well the most populous ethnic group in a riding, if not English or Canadian):

Municipality	Population	Ethnic Origin #1	%	Ethnic Origin #2	%	Ethnic Group #3	%	Ethnic Group #4	%	Ethnic Group #5	%	Ethnic Group #6	%	Ethnic Group #7	%	Ethnic Group #8	%
Toronto	2,691,665	**Chinese**	**12.5**	English	12.3	Canadian	12.0	Irish	9.8	Scottish	9.5	East Indian	7.5				
Mississauga	715,475	**East Indian**	**15.4**	Canadian	10.2	English	9.3	Chinese	9.1								
Brampton	590,950	**East Indian**	**33.4**	Canadian	10.8	Jamaican	7.8	English	7.4								
Markham	327,400	**Chinese**	**46.5**	East Indian	10.1												
Vaughan	304,145	**Italian**	**31.1**	**Russian**	**8.4**	Canadian	8.0	Chinese	7.9								
Richmond Hill	193,800	**Chinese**	**30.2**	**Iranian**	**11.0**	Italian	9.9	Canadian	7.3								
Oakville	191,720	English	22.1	Canadian	16.7	Scottish	16.4	Irish	16.1	Italian	8.8	German	8.1	Chinese	7.7	French	7.4
Ajax	119,180	Canadian	17.7	English	16.9	East Indian	13.0	Scottish	12.8	Irish	11.8	**Jamaican**	**9.2**				
Milton	108,935	Canadian	18.6	English	17.4	Scottish	14.1	Irish	12.8	East Indian	11.7	Italian	7.7	**Pakistani**	**7.2**		
Pickering	90,995	English	20.5	Canadian	19.8	Scottish	15.4	Irish	14.7	East Indian	11.6						
Newmarket	82,730	English	26.3	Canadian	23.0	Scottish	19.1	Irish	17.3	Italian	9.7	German	8.0	Chinese	7.7	French	7.7
Caledon	66,215	**Italian**	**27.3**	English	21.1	Canadian	19.7	Scottish	15.2	Irish	14.3	East Indian	8.3	German	7.3		
Halton Hills	60,195	English	32.5	Canadian	30.0	Scottish	24.1	Irish	22.2	German	10.4	French	9.4	Italian	8.7		
Aurora	54,705	English	23.6	Canadian	19.8	Scottish	16.9	Irish	16.7	Italian	12.5	Chinese	11.1	German	8.6		
Whitchurch-Stouffville	45,345	English	20.1	Canadian	18.6	Chinese	14.8	Scottish	14.3	Irish	13.7	Italian	11.7				
Georgina	44,765	**Canadian**	**36.3**	English	35.4	Scottish	24.3	Irish	23.4	German	10.4	**French**	**10.3**				
Bradford West Gwillimbury	34,965	Canadian	23.3	English	20.6	Italian	15.2	Irish	13.9	Scottish	13.3	**Portuguese**	**11.8**				
New Tecumseth	33,735	English	33.1	Canadian	31.7	**Irish**	**24.8**	Scottish	23.3	German	10.3	Italian	10.2	French	8.6		
King	24,365	**Italian**	**34.5**	English	18.3	Canadian	16.8	Scottish	13.0	Irish	12.6	German	7.4				
East Gwillimbury	23,435	English	34.3	Canadian	30.3	Scottish	22.4	Irish	22.2	German	11.1	Italian	8.7	French	8.6		
Uxbridge	20,975	**English**	**40.3**	Canadian	32.2	**Scottish**	**26.4**	Irish	24.5	**German**	**12.9**	French	8.5				

==== Ridings ====
Visible minorities as percentage of population and top ethnic origins per riding, in the GTA outside the City of Toronto are as follows:

Visible Minorities as % of Population (2016 Census) & Top Ethnic Origins [GTA outside City of Toronto]
Riding (2013 Redistribution)	Percentage	Most Populous Ethnic Origin	Percentage	Most Populous Visible Minority	Percentage
Simcoe—Grey **[New Tecumseth only]**	7.37	**English**	**33.1**	South Asian	1.8
Wellington—Halton Hills **[Halton Hills only]**	7.43	English	32.5	South Asian	2.3
**York—Simcoe**	12.5	Canadian	30.6	South Asian	2.9
Dufferin—Caledon **[Caledon only]**	18.7	Italian	27.3	South Asian	10.0
**Oakville**	25.5	English	25.3	South Asian	6.8
**Newmarket—Aurora**	27.7	English	24.5	Chinese	8.7
**Mississauga—Lakeshore**	28.8	English	19.2	South Asian	8.7
**Vaughan—Woodbridge**	28.9	**Italian**	**53.5**	South Asian	9.4
**Oakville North**—Burlington [incl. part of Burlington]	33.1	English	20.7	South Asian	11.0
**Pickering—Uxbridge**	36.0	English	24.2	South Asian	12.5
**Thornhill**	37.1	**Russian**	**16.4**	Chinese	10.5
**King—Vaughan**	37.3	Italian	31.2	South Asian	12.2
Milton **[Town of Milton only]**	42.8	Canadian	18.6	South Asian	21.0
**Mississauga East—Cooksville**	47.8	**Polish**	**10.6**	South Asian	15.8
**Aurora—Oak Ridges—Richmond Hill**	51.7	Chinese	25.0	Chinese	24.1
**Mississauga—Streetsville**	52.2	East Indian	15.5	South Asian	21.5
**Markham—Stouffville**	54.9	Chinese	24.5	Chinese	22.5
**Ajax**	56.7	Canadian	17.7	South Asian	20.9
**Brampton Centre**	59.8	East Indian	19.9	South Asian	26.2
**Richmond Hill**	61.6	Chinese	32.3	Chinese	31.5
**Mississauga—Erin Mills**	64.1	East Indian	15.1	South Asian	24.6
**Brampton South**	66.6	East Indian	31.4	South Asian	41.5
**Brampton North**	68.0	East Indian	31.1	South Asian	41.5
**Mississauga Centre**	70.6	East Indian	18.0	South Asian	26.6
**Mississauga—Malton**	78.1	East Indian	28.3	South Asian	41.3
**Brampton West**	78.8	East Indian	31.2	South Asian	43.4
**Markham—Unionville**	84.6	**Chinese**	**65.6**	**Chinese**	**64.5**
**Markham—Thornhill**	84.8	Chinese	41.6	Chinese	40.7
**Brampton East**	90.6	**East Indian**	**51.4**	**South Asian**	**65.9**

==== Future projections ====
Panethnic origin projections in 2041 based on 2021 Census data
	2041	
	Population	%
South Asian	2,768,000	27.62%
European (Note: Statistic includes all persons that did not make up part of a visible minority or an aboriginal identity.)	2,759,500	27.53%
East Asian	1,360,000	13.57%
African	925,000	9.23%
Middle Eastern	744,000	7.42%
Southeast Asian	742,000	7.4%
Latin American	299,000	2.98%
Indigenous	95,500	0.95%
Other/multiracial	330,000	3.29%
Projected Metro Toronto Population	10,023,000	100%

== Religion ==
=== City of Toronto ===
Religion in the City of Toronto (2021)
1. Christianity (46.2%)
2. Irreligious (30.6%)
3. Islam (9.60%)
4. Hinduism (6.20%)
5. Judaism (3.60%)
6. Buddhism (2.30%)
7. Sikhism (0.80%)
8. Other (0.80%)

Roman Catholics accounted for 33.4% of the population of the city of Toronto in 2001, followed by Protestants with 21.2%. Members of Christian Orthodox churches accounted for 4.9%, and other Christians (those not specifically identifying as Catholic, Protestant or Orthodox) formed 3.9%. The city's religious makeup also included Islam with 5.5%, Hinduism (4.1%), Judaism (3.5%), Buddhism (2.1%), Sikhism (1%), and other communities; 16.6% reported no religious affiliation.

In particular, the 2001 Census data showed the following data per pre-amalgamation municipality:

- Toronto (667,320): Catholic 31.1%, No religious affiliation 26.2%, Protestant 20.8%, Jewish 5.0%, Muslim 4.0%, Christian Orthodox 3.7%, Buddhist 3.4%
- North York (603,060) : Catholic 30.2%, Protestant 18.0%, No religious affiliation 15.8%, Jewish 10.1%, Muslim 7.8%, Christian Orthodox 5.2%, Christian, not included elsewhere 4.6%, Hindu 4.1%
- Scarborough (588,675) : Catholic 26.2%, Protestant 22.8%, No religious affiliation 19.7%, Hindu 9.7%, Muslim 7.8%, Christian Orthodox 5.1%, Christian, not included elsewhere 4.7%,
- Etobicoke (334,570) : Catholic 39.6%, Protestant 24.6%, No religious affiliation 11.3%, Muslim 6.9%, Hindu 4.9%, Christian Orthodox 4.3%, Christian, not included elsewhere 3.5%, Sikh 3.3%
- York (148,940) : Catholic 45.6%, Protestant 18.8%, No religious affiliation 12.8%, Muslim 5.0%, Christian, not included elsewhere 4.4%, Christian Orthodox 3.9%, Jewish 3.7%
- East York (114,245) : Protestant 25.3%, Catholic 23.6%, No religious affiliation 17.1%, Muslim 12.5%, Christian Orthodox 12.0%, Hindu 3.7%

The 2011 National Household Survey found that Roman Catholics accounted for 28.2% of the population in the city of Toronto in 2011, followed by those of no religious affiliation at 24.1%, "Other Christian" at 9.7%, and Muslims at 8.2%. Besides those registered in the "other Christian" category there were other Christian denominations who were also registered in the census, including Anglicans (3.8%), Baptists (1.4%), Christian Orthodox (4.3%), Lutheran (0.6%), Pentecostal (1.6%), Presbyterian (1.5%), and United Church (3%). Buddhists (2.7%), Hindu (5.6%), Judaism (3.8%), Sikh (0.8%), Aboriginal spirituality (0.03%) and "Other religions" (0.5%) were also included.

=== Toronto CMA ===
Religious groups in the Toronto CMA (1981−2021)
Religious group	2021		2011		2001		1991		1981	
Religious group	Pop.	%	Pop.	%	Pop.	%	Pop.	%	Pop.	%
Christianity	2,851,285	46.42%	3,128,565	56.66%	3,049,050	65.6%	2,851,655	73.82%	2,480,885	83.38%
Irreligion	1,636,860	26.65%	1,165,010	21.1%	784,700	16.88%	562,265	14.55%	272,570	9.16%
Islam	626,010	10.19%	424,935	7.7%	254,115	5.47%	105,965	2.74%	36,695	1.23%
Hinduism	457,825	7.45%	325,420	5.89%	191,305	4.12%	90,140	2.33%	31,090	1.04%
Sikhism	244,240	3.98%	159,905	2.9%	90,590	1.95%	41,450	1.07%	11,620	0.39%
Judaism	165,765	2.7%	167,765	3.04%	164,510	3.54%	151,115	3.91%	123,730	4.16%
Buddhism	120,865	1.97%	124,215	2.25%	97,165	2.09%	48,385	1.25%	11,780	0.4%
Indigenous spirituality	1,290	0.02%	1,110	0.02%	—N/a	—N/a	—N/a	—N/a	—N/a	—N/a
Other	38,745	0.63%	24,305	0.44%	16,525	0.36%	12,120	0.31%	7,125	0.24%
Total responses	6,142,880	99.04%	5,521,235	98.89%	4,647,955	99.25%	3,863,110	99.23%	2,975,495	99.22%
Total population	6,202,225	100%	5,583,064	100%	4,682,897	100%	3,893,046	100%	2,998,947	100%

== Languages ==
=== City of Toronto ===
Mother tongue languages in the City of Toronto (1996–2021)
Mother tongue	2021 Canadian census		2016 Canadian census		2011 Canadian census		2006 Canadian census		2001 Canadian census		1996 Canadian census	
Mother tongue	Pop.	%	Pop.	%	Pop.	%	Pop.	%	Pop.	%	Pop.	%
English	1,557,200	56.16%	1,478,785	54.68%	1,398,460	54.01%	1,282,565	51.79%	1,321,980	53.81%	1,340,060	56.69%
Mandarin	120,560	4.35%	114,435	4.23%	105,175	4.06%	86,850	3.51%	60,710	2.47%	38,450	1.63%
Cantonese	114,410	4.13%	120,195	4.44%	131,445	5.08%	152,500	6.16%	163,150	6.64%	153,790	6.51%
Tagalog	106,265	3.83%	98,745	3.65%	82,960	3.2%	60,435	2.44%	50,735	2.07%	39,975	1.69%
Spanish	87,720	3.16%	78,515	2.9%	75,300	2.91%	67,960	2.74%	57,185	2.33%	54,925	2.32%
Hindustani (Urdu–Hindi)	77,285	2.79%	61,460	2.27%	57,715	2.23%	53,205	2.15%	39,375	1.6%	21,550	0.91%
Portuguese	66,305	2.39%	63,035	2.33%	61,555	2.38%	61,665	2.49%	67,605	2.75%	70,690	2.99%
Tamil	62,995	2.27%	63,685	2.35%	66,750	2.58%	60,580	2.45%	57,030	2.32%	46,875	1.98%
Italian	58,045	2.09%	67,365	2.49%	76,200	2.94%	85,055	3.43%	99,230	4.04%	114,090	4.83%
Persian	54,765	1.98%	51,505	1.9%	43,460	1.68%	36,275	1.46%	31,950	1.3%	22,745	0.96%
French	54,010	1.95%	49,005	1.81%	44,815	1.73%	37,615	1.52%	38,095	1.55%	34,290	1.45%
Arabic	41,375	1.49%	34,030	1.26%	29,160	1.13%	23,890	0.96%	24,320	0.99%	22,125	0.94%
Russian	37,415	1.35%	37,305	1.38%	37,855	1.46%	34,620	1.4%	30,945	1.26%	17,380	0.74%
Bengali	37,220	1.34%	31,450	1.16%	26,205	1.01%	19,195	0.78%	13,465	0.55%	4,925	0.21%
Korean	35,550	1.28%	35,115	1.3%	32,260	1.25%	29,805	1.2%	25,810	1.05%	18,915	0.8%
Gujarati	33,065	1.19%	29,410	1.09%	30,765	1.19%	29,885	1.21%	20,450	0.83%	14,765	0.62%
Vietnamese	30,795	1.11%	26,380	0.98%	24,790	0.96%	25,150	1.02%	24,560	1%	24,025	1.02%
Greek	27,415	0.99%	30,420	1.12%	31,325	1.21%	32,590	1.32%	36,855	1.5%	37,750	1.6%
Punjabi	25,855	0.93%	21,710	0.8%	24,540	0.95%	25,575	1.03%	27,880	1.13%	23,250	0.98%
Polish	22,875	0.83%	26,265	0.97%	28,980	1.12%	32,970	1.33%	37,125	1.51%	48,140	2.04%
Serbo-Croatian	21,210	0.76%	22,475	0.83%	22,970	0.89%	21,290	0.86%	24,050	0.98%	20,675	0.87%
Ukrainian	15,830	0.57%	16,190	0.6%	16,310	0.63%	17,380	0.7%	18,515	0.75%	18,145	0.77%
German–Yiddish	14,925	0.54%	18,040	0.67%	21,430	0.83%	24,255	0.98%	28,185	1.15%	32,235	1.36%
Somali	13,095	0.47%	12,825	0.47%	13,010	0.5%	11,470	0.46%	—N/a	—N/a	—N/a	—N/a
Turkish	12,755	0.46%	9,360	0.35%	8,235	0.32%	6,905	0.28%	5,385	0.22%	3,450	0.15%
Ilocano	11,995	0.43%	7,735	0.29%	5,635	0.22%	4,140	0.17%	—N/a	—N/a	—N/a	—N/a
Romanian	11,430	0.41%	12,810	0.47%	13,655	0.53%	13,770	0.56%	12,775	0.52%	8,730	0.37%
Hungarian	10,900	0.39%	12,270	0.45%	13,935	0.54%	12,270	0.5%	14,605	0.59%	14,870	0.63%
Albanian	9,965	0.36%	8,905	0.33%	8,365	0.32%	—N/a	—N/a	—N/a	—N/a	—N/a	—N/a
Malayalam	9,035	0.33%	5,210	0.19%	3,270	0.13%	2,815	0.11%	2,005	0.08%	1,400	0.06%
Amharic	8,805	0.32%	6,910	0.26%	6,030	0.23%	5,210	0.21%	—N/a	—N/a	—N/a	—N/a
Armenian	8,795	0.32%	8,380	0.31%	6,925	0.27%	6,420	0.26%	6,535	0.27%	6,715	0.28%
Telugu	8,520	0.31%	4,945	0.18%	2,855	0.11%	2,125	0.09%	—N/a	—N/a	—N/a	—N/a
Japanese	7,745	0.28%	7,530	0.28%	6,610	0.26%	6,115	0.25%	5,660	0.23%	5,770	0.24%
Tigrigna	7,295	0.26%	4,430	0.16%	3,460	0.13%	3,055	0.12%	—N/a	—N/a	—N/a	—N/a
Aramaic	6,250	0.23%	5,985	0.22%	—N/a	—N/a	—N/a	—N/a	—N/a	—N/a	—N/a	—N/a
Macedonian	6,060	0.22%	6,600	0.24%	7,175	0.28%	7,815	0.32%	8,445	0.34%	11,370	0.48%
Tibetan	5,870	0.21%	4,995	0.18%	3,880	0.15%	—N/a	—N/a	—N/a	—N/a	—N/a	—N/a
Czech–Slovak	5,645	0.2%	6,230	0.23%	6,045	0.23%	5,710	0.23%	5,925	0.24%	6,735	0.28%
Min Nan	5,465	0.2%	6,420	0.24%	4,445	0.17%	1,285	0.05%	—N/a	—N/a	—N/a	—N/a
Hebrew	5,395	0.19%	4,760	0.18%	4,825	0.19%	4,215	0.17%	3,540	0.14%	4,000	0.17%
Pashto	5,180	0.19%	4,660	0.17%	3,715	0.14%	2,760	0.11%	2,315	0.09%	1,400	0.06%
Akan (Twi)	4,785	0.17%	5,120	0.19%	5,405	0.21%	5,890	0.24%	—N/a	—N/a	—N/a	—N/a
Creoles	4,655	0.17%	4,370	0.16%	3,920	0.15%	1,845	0.07%	1,315	0.05%	1,070	0.05%
Marathi	4,225	0.15%	2,040	0.08%	1,480	0.06%	—N/a	—N/a	—N/a	—N/a	—N/a	—N/a
Bulgarian	4,100	0.15%	4,510	0.17%	4,655	0.18%	4,560	0.18%	3,405	0.14%	2,260	0.1%
Sinhala	4,040	0.15%	3,655	0.14%	3,645	0.14%	3,195	0.13%	—N/a	—N/a	—N/a	—N/a
Yoruba	3,980	0.14%	2,080	0.08%	—N/a	—N/a	—N/a	—N/a	—N/a	—N/a	—N/a	—N/a
Nepali	3,830	0.14%	2,730	0.1%	1,435	0.06%	—N/a	—N/a	—N/a	—N/a	—N/a	—N/a
Swahili	3,350	0.12%	2,675	0.1%	2,455	0.09%	2,130	0.09%	—N/a	—N/a	—N/a	—N/a
Latvian–Lithuanian	2,935	0.11%	3,625	0.13%	4,135	0.16%	4,520	0.18%	5,785	0.24%	6,645	0.28%
Hakka	2,915	0.11%	3,075	0.11%	1,755	0.07%	—N/a	—N/a	1,185	0.05%	—N/a	—N/a
Dutch	2,800	0.1%	3,385	0.13%	3,785	0.15%	3,720	0.15%	4,390	0.18%	4,960	0.21%
Total responses	2,772,625	99.2%	2,704,420	99%	2,589,085	99%	2,476,565	98.9%	2,456,800	99%	2,363,875	99.1%
Total population	2,794,356	100%	2,731,571	100%	2,615,060	100%	2,503,281	100%	2,481,494	100%	2,385,421	100%

The finest granularity of mother tongue and language spoken in Toronto yet provided by the 2011 Census is that of the federal electoral district (riding; 2003 redistribution). Census tracts (and hence ward and neighbourhood) data is not yet available. For each of the federal electoral districts in the City of Toronto, the top three (or more if having more than 3% of native speakers; single responses are used – it is indicated by way of using bold whether English is the mother tongue of more than 60% of the population or if another language exceeds 10% of native speakers) are as follows:

TORONTO & EAST YORK

- Trinity-Spadina (137,865): 1. English (60.2%), 2. Cantonese (4.7%), 3. Portuguese (4.5%), 4. Chinese, not otherwise specified (4.5%), 5. Mandarin (3.8%)
- Toronto Centre (123,430): 1. English (61.7%), 2. Spanish (2.5%), 3. Chinese, not otherwise specified (2.4%)
- St. Paul's (112,470): 1. English (69.4%), 2. Spanish (3.0%), 3. Tagalog (Pilipino, Filipino) (2.6%)
- Beaches-East York (103,625): 1. English (70.0%), 2. Bengali (3.7%), 3. Greek (2.0%)
- Parkdale-High Park (100,595) : 1. English (63.0%), 2. Polish (4.3%), 3. Spanish (2.3%)
- Toronto-Danforth (100,420): 1. English (63.7%), 2. Cantonese (5.8%), 3. Greek (5.0%), 4. Chinese, not otherwise specified (3.6%)
- Davenport (98,425): 1. English (47.5%), 2. Portuguese (21.4%), 3. Italian (5.9%), 4. Spanish (5.6%)

NORTH YORK

- Willowdale (135,455): 1. English (35.1%), 2. Chinese, not otherwise specified (9.4%), 3. Persian (9.3%), 4. Korean (7.9%), 5. Mandarin (7.7%)
- Don Valley West (118,545): 1. English (54.4%), 2. Urdu (5.9%), 3. Persian (4.0%)
- York Centre (112,950): 1. English (40.5%), 2. Russian (11.9%), 3. Italian (7.6%), 4. Tagalog (Pilipino, Filipino) (7.4%) 5. Spanish (5.0%)
- Eglinton-Lawrence (108,730): 1. English (63.1%), 2. Tagalog (Pilipino, Filipino) (5.3%), 3. Italian (4.9%)
- Don Valley East (106,115): 1. English (42.1%), 2. Mandarin (6.5%), 3. Chinese, not otherwise specified (6.1%) 4. Persian (4.6%), 5. Arabic (3.5%), 6. Tagalog (Pilipino, Filipino) (3.2%), 7. Cantonese (3.2%)
- York West (103,395): 1. English (44.0%), 2. Italian (9.6%), 3. Spanish (8.5%), 4. Vietnamese (5.3%), 5. Urdu (3.0%)

SCARBOROUGH

- Scarborough-Rouge River (128,905): 1. English (37.4%), 2. Tamil (13.8%), 3. Cantonese (13.1%), 4. Mandarin (4.6%), 5. Tagalog (Pilipino, Filipino) (4.3%), 6. Urdu (3.2%)
- Scarborough-Agincourt (107,465): 1. English (30.2%), 2. Chinese, not otherwise specified (15.8%), 3. Cantonese (14.4%), 4. Mandarin (12.0%), 5. Tamil (5.0%)
- Scarborough-Guildwood (105,900): 1. English (57.6%), 2. Tamil (8.0%), 3. Gujarati (6.0%), 4 Tagalog (Pilipino, Filipino) (3.9%), 5. Urdu (3.2%)
- Scarborough Centre (105,880): 1. English (47.7%), 2. Tamil (8.5%), 3. Tagalog (Pilipino, Filipino) (6.1%) 4. Chinese, not otherwise specified (3.8%), 5. Cantonese (3.5%)
- Scarborough Southwest (103,270): 1. English (59.3%), 2. Bengali (6.1%), 3. Tagalog (Pilipino, Filipino) (5.0%), 4. Tamil (3.4%)

ETOBICOKE YORK

- Etobicoke-Lakeshore (119,120): 1. English (59.7%), 2. Polish (5.6%), 3. Ukrainian (3.5%)
- York South-Weston (111,710): 1. English (49.9%), 2. Portuguese (9.0%), 3. Spanish (8.2%), 4. Italian (7.6%), 5. Vietnamese (3.6%)
- Etobicoke Centre (109,250): 1. English (54.1%), 2. Italian (5.5%), 3. Ukrainian (4.1%), 4. Spanish (3.2%)
- Etobicoke North (105,620): 1. English (45.4%), 2. Panjabi (Punjabi) (10.1%), 3. Gujarati (4.8%), 4. Italian (3.8%), 5. Urdu (3.1%), 6. Somali (3.0%)

=== Toronto CMA ===
Top 20 languages Toronto CMA, 2016	Population	%
English	3,061,820	52.0
Cantonese	247,710	4.2
Mandarin	227,085	3.9
Panjabi (Punjabi)	171,230	2.9
Italian	151,415	2.6
Tagalog (Filipino)	136,115	2.3
Urdu	128,845	2.2
Spanish	126,500	2.2
Tamil	109,580	1.9
Portuguese	104,305	1.8
Persian	100,640	1.7
Arabic	85,175	1.5
Russian	83,105	1.4
Polish	69,860	1.2
French	65,535	1.1
Gujarati	64,115	1.1
Korean	55,005	0.9
Hindi	48,140	0.8
Vietnamese	48,005	0.8
Greek	41,225	0.7

Following are the corresponding data for the GTA ridings neighbouring the City of Toronto:

IN YORK REGION

- Oak Ridges-Markham (220,005): 1. English (52.2%), 2. Cantonese (10.9%), 3. Chinese, not otherwise specified (6.6%), 4. Italian (3.5%), 5. Mandarin (3.2%)
- Vaughan (187,340): 1. English (47.5%), 2. Italian (20.0%), 3. Spanish (3.1%)
- Thornhill (136,120): 1. English (47.6%), 2. Russian (10.9%), 3. Cantonese (4.5%), 4. Persian (4.1%) 5. Chinese, not otherwise specified (3.9%), 6. Korean (3.2%) 7. Hebrew (3.1%)
- Markham-Unionville (131,250): 1. English (34.2%), 2. Cantonese (18.1%), 3. Chinese, not otherwise specified (12.7%), 4. Tamil (7.5%), 5. Mandarin (6.0%), 6. Urdu (3.2%)
- Newmarket-Aurora (129,460): 1. English (77.4%), 2. Italian (2.1%), 3. Russian (1.7%)
- Richmond Hill (124,865): 1. English (40.4%), 2. Cantonese (10.1%), 3. Persian (9.2%), 4. Russian (7.8%), 5. Mandarin (5.7%), 6. Italian (5.7%), 7. Korean (3.4%)

IN PEEL REGION

- Bramalea-Gore-Malton (182,545): 1. English (49.3%), 2. Panjabi (Punjabi) (22.2%), 3. Urdu (3.0%)
- Mississauga-Brampton South (138,495): 1. English (41.6%), 2. Panjabi (Punjabi) (8.0%), 3. Urdu (5.2%), 4. Polish (3.8%), 5. Tagalog (Pilipino, Filipino) (3.5%)
- Mississauga East-Cooksville (131,915): 1. English (40.0%), 2. Polish (6.7%), 3. Urdu (5.0%), 4. Arabic (4.8%), 5. Tagalog (Pilipino, Filipino) (4.1%), 6. Spanish (3.2%)
- Mississauga South (108,685): 1. English (66.0%), 2. Polish (4.9%), 3. Portuguese (2.4%)

IN DURHAM REGION

- Ajax-Pickering (133,135): 1. English (78.2%), 2. Urdu (2.3%), 3. Tagalog (Pilipino, Filipino) (2.1%)
- Pickering-Scarborough East (104,495): 1. English (76.6%), 2. Tamil (2.4%), 3. Tagalog (Pilipino, Filipino) (2.4%)

== Immigration ==
=== City of Toronto ===
According to the 2006 census, the immigrant proportion in the City of Toronto stood at 50.0 percent The percentage and breakdown of immigrants per place of birth for each City of Toronto Community Council is as follows:

- Toronto & East York (642,940): 39.0% (Eastern Asia 6.7%; Southern Europe 6.5%; Southeast Asia 4.1%; Southern Asia 3.7%; Eastern Europe 3.3%; Northern Europe 3.2%)
- North York (635,265): 54.4% (Eastern Asia 11.3%; Eastern Europe 6.5%; West Central Asia & Middle East 6.1%; Southern Europe 6.0%; Southeast Asia 5.5%; Southern Asia 5.5%)
- Scarborough (602,610): 57.4% (Eastern Asia 14.3%; Southern Asia 13.9%; Southeast Asia 6.6%; Caribbean & Bermuda 5.1%; South America 3.4%; Southern Europe 3.2%)
- Etobicoke York (595,370): 49.6% (Southern Europe 11.4%; Southern Asia 7.0%; Eastern Europe 5.8%; Caribbean & Bermuda 4.6%; Southeast Asia 4.2%; South America 4.1%)

The City of Toronto ward with the highest percentage of total immigrants is Ward 41 Scarborough-Rouge River where 71.4% of the total population are immigrants (Eastern Asia 41.4%, Southern Asia 10.7%, Southeast Asia 6.0%, Caribbean & Bermuda 3.8%). At the other end of the spectrum is Ward 16 Eglinton-Lawrence having the lowest percentage of immigrants, 24.7% in particular (Eastern Europe 4.1%, Northern Europe 3.4%, Southern Europe 3.3%).

=== Toronto CMA ===
According to the Canadian government, Toronto has one of the highest per capita immigration rates in the world. Within Canada itself, 43% of all new immigrants to Canada settle in the Greater Toronto Area adding significantly to Toronto's population.

The 2021 census reported that immigrants (individuals born outside Canada) comprise 2,862,850 persons or 46.6 percent of the total population of the Toronto CMA.

Immigrants in Toronto CMA by country of birth (1921-2021)
Country of Birth	2021		2016		2011		2006		2001		1996		1941		1921 (Note: Combined population of York County, Peel County, Durham County, and Halton County, which approximately represents the geographical extent of the contemporary Greater Toronto Area.)	
Country of Birth	Pop.	%	Pop.	%	Pop.	%	Pop.	%	Pop.	%	Pop.	%	Pop.	%	Pop.	%
India	394,620	13.8%	307,275	11.4%	268,915	10.6%	221,935	9.6%	147,165	7.2%	99,930	5.6%	492	0.2%	413	0.2%
China	296,630	10.4%	266,840	9.9%	224,915	8.9%	191,120	8.2%	136,135	6.7%	87,615	4.9%	2,345	0.8%	2,172	0.9%
Philippines	212,655	7.4%	192,265	7.1%	173,495	6.8%	130,315	5.6%	103,170	5.1%	80,855	4.6%	—N/a	—N/a	—N/a	—N/a
Pakistan	128,305	4.5%	119,085	4.4%	97,065	3.8%	85,630	3.7%	51,185	2.5%	22,870	1.3%	—N/a	—N/a	—N/a	—N/a
Hong Kong	99,510	3.5%	100,065	3.7%	97,660	3.8%	103,090	4.4%	110,735	5.4%	110,990	6.3%	—N/a	—N/a	—N/a	—N/a
Sri Lanka	99,280	3.5%	101,545	3.8%	103,580	4.1%	84,225	3.6%	68,790	3.4%	54,000	3%	—N/a	—N/a	—N/a	—N/a
Jamaica	95,900	3.3%	99,660	3.7%	96,160	3.8%	93,845	4%	92,190	4.5%	86,910	4.9%	1,354 (Note: All individuals born in the British West Indies)	0.5%	1,348	0.5%
Italy	87,870	3.1%	103,615	3.8%	115,060	4.5%	130,685	5.6%	138,990	6.8%	146,515	8.3%	6,090	2.2%	4,511	1.8%
Iran	87,105	3%	74,525	2.8%	59,750	2.4%	45,435	2%	34,930	1.7%	21,785	1.2%	—N/a	—N/a	—N/a	—N/a
United Kingdom	85,895	3%	99,170	3.7%	112,580	4.4%	125,975	5.4%	142,990	7%	158,070	8.9%	165,682	59.4%	174,658	68.5%
Guyana	64,885	2.3%	69,020	2.6%	71,360	2.8%	68,905	3%	66,980	3.3%	60,700	3.4%	—N/a (Note: Totals included as part of British West Indies, represented by Jamaica in the column.)	—N/a	—N/a	—N/a
Portugal	63,460	2.2%	71,045	2.6%	72,680	2.9%	76,300	3.3%	78,895	3.9%	82,105	4.6%	—N/a	—N/a	—N/a	—N/a
Vietnam	62,105	2.2%	59,365	2.2%	59,495	2.3%	58,975	2.5%	52,600	2.6%	50,075	2.8%	—N/a	—N/a	—N/a	—N/a
Poland	50,405	1.8%	57,450	2.1%	63,065	2.5%	66,790	2.9%	70,490	3.5%	74,225	4.2%	23,368	8.4%	7,461	2.9%
South Korea	48,770	1.7%	45,700	1.7%	43,675	1.7%	39,820	1.7%	31,080	1.5%	20,545	1.2%	—N/a	—N/a	—N/a	—N/a
United States of America	48,265	1.7%	46,700	1.7%	47,310	1.9%	41,280	1.8%	37,795	1.9%	36,360	2.1%	18,185	6.5%	17,696	6.9%
Trinidad and Tobago	40,855	1.4%	43,135	1.6%	45,925	1.8%	44,335	1.9%	43,700	2.1%	41,055	2.3%	—N/a	—N/a	—N/a	—N/a
Bangladesh	36,745	1.3%	32,385	1.2%	25,090	1%	18,905	0.8%	11,890	0.6%	4,360	0.2%	—N/a	—N/a	—N/a	—N/a
Iraq	34,575	1.2%	29,230	1.1%	21,530	0.8%	14,910	0.6%	11,080	0.5%	7,400	0.4%	—N/a	—N/a	—N/a	—N/a
Russia	33,760	1.2%	34,380	1.3%	34,330	1.4%	30,145	1.3%	23,200	1.1%	11,520	0.6%	10,068	3.6%	11,299	4.4%
Total immigrants	2,862,850	46.6%	2,705,550	46.1%	2,537,410	46%	2,320,160	45.7%	2,032,960	43.7%	1,772,905	41.9%	278,841	31%	254,820	35.3%
Total responses	6,142,880	99%	5,862,855	98.9%	5,521,235	98.9%	5,072,075	99.2%	4,647,960	99.3%	4,232,905	99.3%	900,491	100%	721,089	100%
Total population	6,202,225	100%	5,928,040	100%	5,583,064	100%	5,113,149	100%	4,682,897	100%	4,263,759	100%	900,491	100%	721,089	100%

According to the 2006 Census, 45.7% of the residents of Toronto CMA were immigrants.

The 2006 Census data show the following temporal patterns in the sources of immigration to Toronto (and retention of immigrants per source country):

- Recent immigrants (2001–2006, 447,930): India 17.4%, China 14.3%, Pakistan 8.3%, Philippines 7.4%, Sri Lanka 3.9%, Iran 3.2%
- Period of immigration: 1996–2000 (362,320): India 13.5%, China 13.1%, Pakistan 7.8%, Philippines 5.9%, Sri Lanka 5.2%, Hong Kong 4.3%, Iran 3.4%, Russia 3.2%
- Period of immigration: 1991–1995 (357,865): Hong Kong 9.1%, India 8.7%, Philippines 8.7%, Sri Lanka 8.3%, China 8.1%, Poland 4.5%, Jamaica 4.1%, Guyana 3.5%, Vietnam 3.3%
- Period of immigration: Before 1991 (1,152,050): Italy 11.1%, United Kingdom 9.7%, Portugal 5.9%, India 5.6%, Jamaica 5.5%, Hong Kong 4.5%, China 4.4%, Philippines 3.9%, Poland 3.8%, Guyana 3.8%, Vietnam 3.4%

== Highs and lows (2011 Census) ==
=== Wards ===
- Largest area (hectares): Ward 42 - Scarborough-Rouge River: 3,928
- Smallest area (hectares): Ward 18 - Davenport: 474
- Most populous: Ward 23 - Willowdale: 79,435
- Least populous: Ward 19 - Toronto-Danforth: 44,420
- Highest % recent immigrants: Ward 33 - Don Valley East: 24.1%
- Lowest % recent immigrants: Ward 16 - Eglinton Lawrence: 3.7%
- Highest % visible minorities: Ward 42 - Scarborough-Rouge River: 88.7%
- Lowest % visible minorities: Ward 16 - Eglinton Lawrence: 12.6%
- Highest median household income: Ward 25 - Don Valley West: $86,901
- Lowest median household income: Ward 14 - Parkdale-High Park: $38,352

=== Ethnocultural ===
==== Mother tongue ====
(highest %)

- English: Ward 32 - Beaches-East York: 77.7% (Lowest %: Ward 39 - Scarborough-Agincourt: 24.9%)
- Portuguese: Ward 18 - Davenport: 25.3%
- Cantonese: Ward 41 - Scarborough-Rouge River: 23.5%
- Chinese, not otherwise specified: Ward 39 - Scarborough-Agincourt: 22.2%
- Italian: Ward 9 - York Centre: 20.4%
- Russian: Ward 10 - York Centre: 19.5%
- Tamil: Ward 42 - Scarborough-Rouge River: 15.1%
- Panjabi (Punjabi): Ward 1 - Etobicoke North: 13.3%
- Urdu: Ward 26 - Don Valley West: 11.2%
- Greek: Ward 29 - Toronto-Danforth: 10.7%

==== Home language ====
(highest %)

- English: Ward 16 - Eglinton-Lawrence: 89.9% (Lowest %: Ward 39 - Scarborough-Agincourt: 36.1%)
- Cantonese: Ward 41 - Scarborough-Rouge River: 22.5%
- Chinese, not otherwise specified: Ward 39 - Scarborough-Agincourt: 18.3%
- Portuguese: Ward 18 - Davenport: 17.8%
- Russian: Ward 10 - York Centre: 17.6%
- Italian: Ward 9 - York Centre: 12.7%
- Tamil: Ward 42 - Scarborough-Rouge River: 12.7%
- Panjabi (Punjabi): Ward 1 - Etobicoke North: 11.0%

==== Ethnic origin ====
(highest %; single responses)

- Chinese: Ward 41 - Scarborough-Rouge River: 56.1%
- Portuguese: Ward 17 - Davenport: 28.0%
- Italian: Ward 9 - York Centre: 27.2%
- East Indian: Ward 1 - Etobicoke North: 26.0%
- Jewish: Ward 10 - York Centre: 17.3%
- Greek: Ward 29 - Toronto-Danforth: 13.0%

==== Visible minority ====
(highest %)

- Not a visible minority: Ward 16 - Eglinton-Lawrence: 87.4%
- Chinese: Ward 41 - Scarborough-Rouge River: 57.3%
- South Asian: Ward 1 - Etobicoke North: 37.9%
- Black: Ward 8 - York West: 21.8%
- Filipino: Ward 25 - Scarborough Southwest: 10.4%
- Latin American: Ward 7 - York West: 9.6%
- Korean: Ward 23 - Willowdale: 9.4%
- Southeast Asian: Ward 8 - York West: 7.2%
- West Asian: Ward 23 - Willowdale: 6.9%
- Arab: Ward 34 - Don Valley East: 3.0%
- Japanese: Ward 27 - Toronto Centre-Rosedale: 1.2%

=== Education ===
(highest %)

- Earned doctorate: Ward 20 - Trinity-Spadina: 3.3%
- Master's degree: Ward 27 - Toronto Centre-Rosedale: 13.0%
- Degree in medicine, dentistry, veterinary medicine: Ward 25 - Don Valley West: 3.5%
- University certificate above bachelor level: Ward 22 - St. Paul's: 5.5%
- Bachelor's degree: Ward 22 - St. Paul's: 31.5%
- University certificate or degree: Ward 22 - St. Paul's: 54.1%
