= Sri Lankan Canadians =

Total population
- 136,240 (by place of birth, 2021 Census)

Regions with significant populations
- Ontario; Quebec; British Columbia; Alberta

Languages
- Canadian English; Sri Lankan English; Canadian French; Tamil (Sri Lankan dialect); Sinhala; Sri Lanka Malay

Religion
- Hinduism; Theravada Buddhism; Islam; Christianity

Related ethnic groups
- Sri Lankan people; South Asian Canadians

Sri Lankan Canadians refers to people from Sri Lanka who have arrived and settled in Canada. Among these immigrants include members from the Tamil, Moor, Malay, Sinhalese and Burgher ethnicities. According to the 2021 census there are 136,240 Sri Lankan-born persons in Canada.

== Demography ==
Sri Lankan Canadian demography by religion
Religious group	2021 (Note: Religious breakdown proportions based on "Sri Lankan" and "Sinhalese" ethnic or cultural origin responses on the 2021 census.)		2001 (Note: Religious breakdown proportions based on "Sri Lankan" and "Sinhalese" ethnic or cultural origin responses on the 2001 census.)	
Religious group	Pop.	%	Pop.	%
Hinduism	74,910	51.85%	39,090	63.75%
Christianity	34,550	23.91%	15,350	25.03%
Buddhism	19,050	13.18%	3,440	5.61%
Irreligion	10,220	7.07%	1,715	2.8%
Islam	5,425	3.75%	1,470	2.4%
Judaism	60	0.04%	55	0.09%
Sikhism	55	0.04%	40	0.07%
Indigenous spirituality	0	0%	0	0%
Other	225	0.16%	145	0.24%
Total Sri Lankan Canadian population	144,485	100%	61,315	100%

== Geographical distribution ==
Sri Lankan Canadians are concentrated in the cities of Toronto and Montreal. According to the 2001 census, there are 62,000 Canadians who claim Sri Lankan ancestry, but only 10,000 claimed to be of Sinhalese ancestry. The number may not be an actual representation because many Tamil Canadians from Sri Lanka classify themselves as Tamil rather than Sri Lankan due to history of the Sri Lankan Civil War.

=== Provinces & territories ===
The Sri Lankan Canadian Population according to Statistics Canada in the 2006 census in the 10 Canadian Provinces and 3 territories:

Province	Sri Lankans
Ontario	85,935
Quebec	10,750
British Columbia	4,150
Alberta	1,740
Manitoba	445
Saskatchewan	240
Nova Scotia	155
Newfoundland and Labrador	115
New Brunswick	45
Yukon	25
Northwest Territories	10
Nunavut	10
Prince Edward Island	0
Canada	103,625

== Dual citizenship ==
Some Sri Lankan Canadians hold citizenship in both Canada and Sri Lanka. The Sri Lankan government encourage Sri Lankan expatriates to obtain the citizenship of their country of birth at a fee and to return to Sri Lanka at a future date. There is a drive to attract the educated Sri Lankan immigrants in Canada for new opportunities arising in the government sector of Sri Lanka (such as universities, research institutes etc.), which may sometime require the applicants to be Sri Lankan citizens.

== Notable Sri Lankan Canadians ==
Famous Sri Lankan Canadians include Michael Ondaatje and his financier brother Christopher Ondaatje; Principal Research scientist at the National Research Council of Canada Chandre Dharma-wardana; Academic Engineer Indira Samarasekera, musician Nirmala Basnayake, formerly of the band controller.controller; news anchor Anne-Marie Mediwake; anchor novelist Shyam Selvadurai; cricketers Sanjayan Thuraisingam, film Actor, producer and multiple Guinness World Record-holder Suresh Joachim; and Pubudu Dassanayake.

== See also ==
- South Asian Canadian
- Tamil Canadians
