= Spanish Canadians =

Canadians of Spanish ancestry

hispanocanadienses (Spanish) Canadiens espagnols (French)
- Spanish ancestry by census division (2021)

Total population
- 342,040 (by ancestry, 2021 Census)

Regions with significant populations
- Greater Toronto; Greater Montreal; Greater Vancouver; Greater Calgary; Edmonton

Languages
- English; French; Spanish; Catalan

Religion
- Catholicism; Protestantism; Judaism

Related ethnic groups
- Latin American Canadians; Hispanic and Latino Americans; Spanish Americans; Hispanics; French; Italians; Portuguese

Spanish Canadians (Spanish: hispanocanadienses or canadienses españoles) are Canadians of full or partial Spanish descent who hold citizenship from Spain as well as one from Canada. They likely also include many Canadians of Latin-American ethnic origin who use the term "Spanish" as a panethnic ethnonym rather than only their specific country of ancestry. For example, someone whose familial origins are from El Salvador, Honduras, Colombia or Guatemala may call themself "Spanish" to identify with the larger Spanish speaking community. See Latin American Canadian for more information.

== History ==
=== Spanish claims and presence in Canada ===
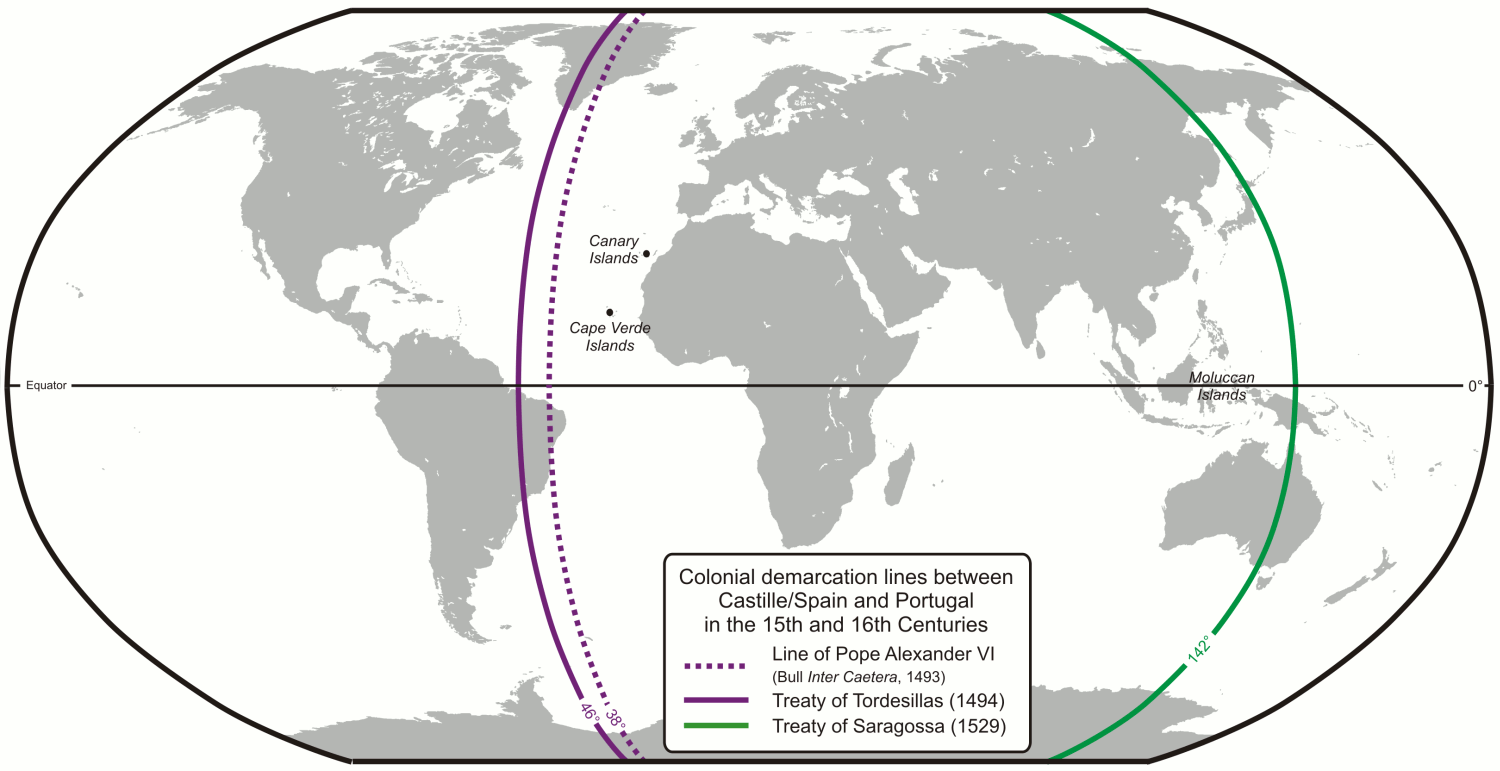
Lines dividing the non-Christian world between Castille (modern Spain) and Portugal: the 1494 Tordesillas meridian (purple) and the 1529 Zaragoza antimeridian (green)

Spain had land claims to all of Canada since Christopher Columbus claimed the New World for Spain on 12 October 1492. Through the Treaty of Tordesillas signed 7 June 1494 the Pope Alexander VI divided the New World between Spain and Portugal. Portugal received the eastern portion of Brazil and Spain received the rest, which included Canada.(see Treaty of Tordesillas)

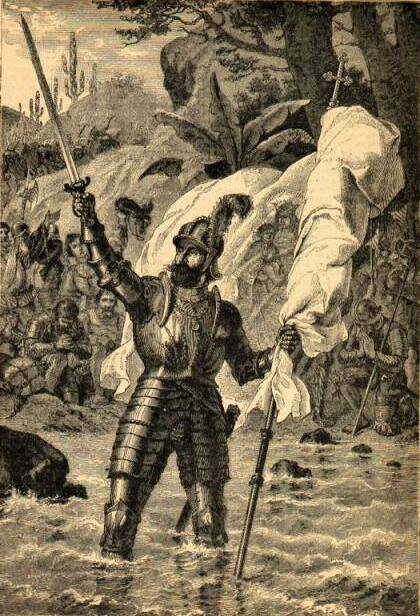
Vasco Núñez de Balboa was the first European to take possession of the Pacific Ocean and adjoining lands for Spain.

Later the Spanish conquistador and explorer Vasco Núñez de Balboa became the first European to see and stand in the waters of the eastern shore of the Pacific Ocean. He accomplished this feat after an arduous trek through the jungles of what is now Panama. Once there Balboa with raised hands, his sword in one and a standard with the image of the Virgin Mary in the other, he walked knee-deep into Ocean, and claimed possession of the Pacific Ocean and all adjoining lands (which included British Columbia) for Spain in the name of his Spanish sovereigns on 13 September 1513.

Then a Greek born Spanish explorer Juan de Fuca in the service of the king of Spain, Philip II, explored the Strait of Anián in 1592, now known as the Strait of Juan de Fuca, between Vancouver Island, now part of British Columbia, Canada and northwestern Washington state, United States.

People from northwestern Spain known as Basques have been landing in Newfoundland since the late 14th century to dry their cod fish, which they caught in the Grand Banks of Newfoundland. By 1578, Anthony Parkhurst, a merchant, explorer, and advocate of English settlement in Newfoundland, was able to count over 100 Spanish vessels at Newfoundland, all seeking cod. In contrast, the level of English activity during this period was quite small. Parkhurst claimed that in 1573, there were only four English vessels at Newfoundland.

=== Spanish presence in the Pacific Northwest ===
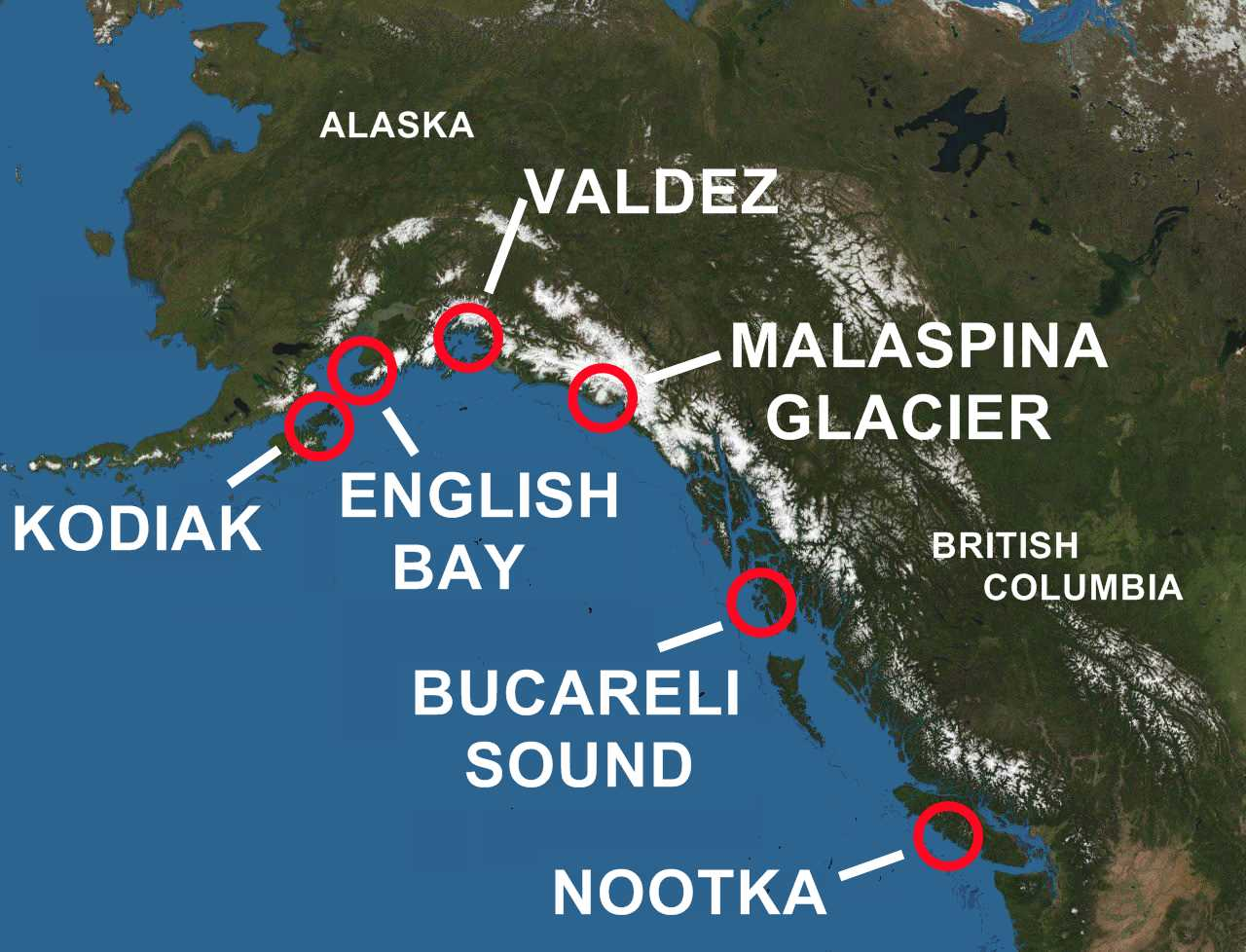
Areas of Alaska and British Columbia explored by Spanish explorers

Starting in the mid-18th century, Spain's claim began to be challenged in the form of British and Russian fur trading and colonization. King Charles III of Spain and his successors sent a number of expeditions to present-day Canada and Alaska between 1774 and 1793, to counter the threat of Russian and British colonizers and to strengthen the Spanish claim. During this period of history it was important for a nation's claims to be backed up by exploration and the "first European discovery" of particular places.

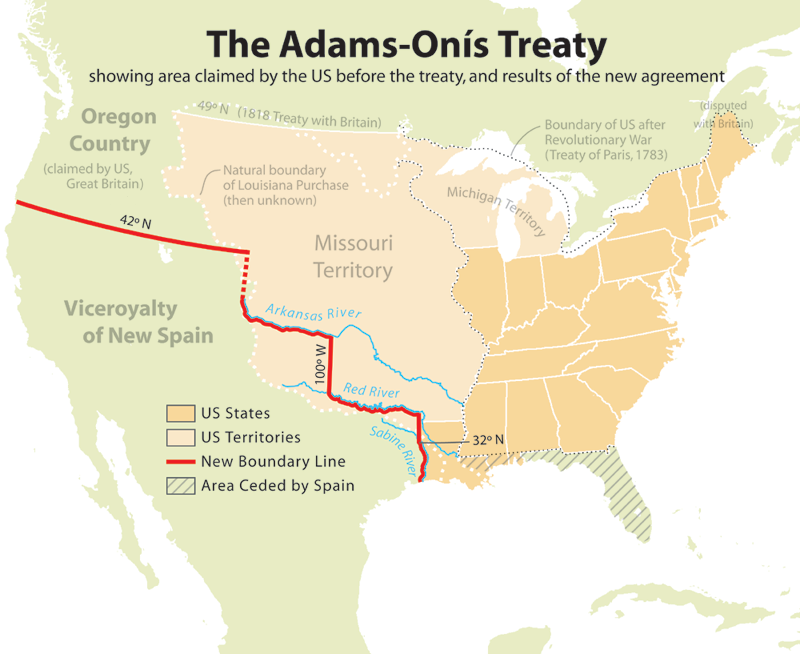
Map showing results of the Adams–Onís Treaty

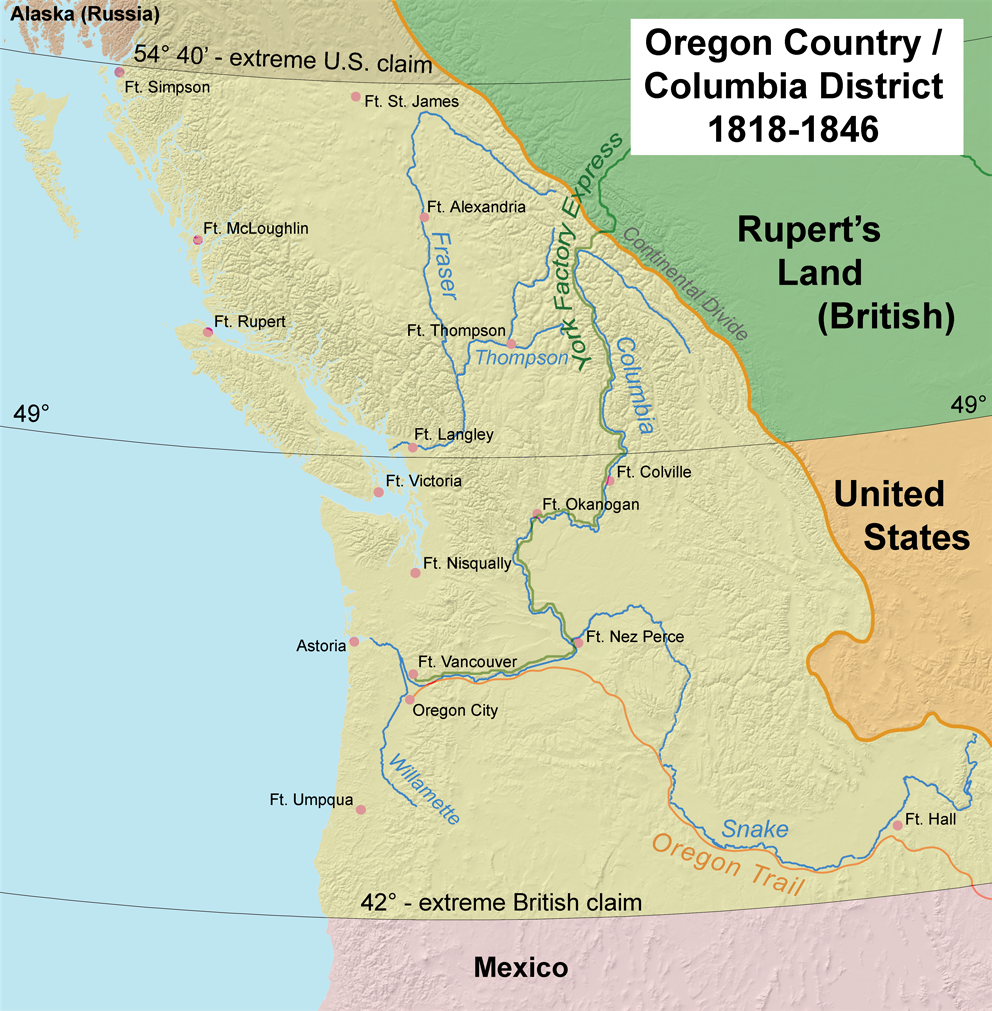
Map of the Oregon Country "jointly occupied" by the U.S. and Britain. The Columbia Department at its greatest extent included areas far to the north and south.

Since Spain was busy colonizing Latin America, Canada was ignored until the 18th century when Spain made an effort to explore and set up forts in British Columbia. While it is thought that Sir Francis Drake may have explored the British Columbian coast in 1579, it was Juan Pérez who completed the first documented voyage, which took place in 1774. Juan Francisco de la Bodega y Quadra explored the coast in 1775. In doing so, Pérez and de la Bodega reasserted the Spanish claim for the Pacific coast, first made by Vasco Núñez de Balboa in 1513.

=== Spanish dispute with Britain ===
A major war between Spain and Britain over British Columbia could have begun via the Nootka Sound dispute in 1789. Spain at the time sent José Martínez to occupy Nootka Sound and establish exclusive Spanish sovereignty. During the summer of 1789, a number of fur trading vessels, British and American, arrived at Nootka. A conflict over sovereignty arose between the captain of the British Argonaut, James Colnett, and Martínez. By the end of the summer Martínez had arrested Colnett, seized several British ships, and arrested their crews. Colnett had come to Nootka Sound intending to build a permanent trading post and colony on land previously acquired by his business associate John Meares. At the end of the summer Martínez abandoned Nootka and took the captured ships and prisoners to San Blas, New Spain. The news about these events triggered a confrontation between Spain and Britain known as the Nootka Crisis which nearly led to war. A major war over British Columbia with the British was peacefully resolved via the Nootka Convention, with both parties retaining their claims until a future solution could be finalized.

=== The United States inherits Spain's dispute with Great Britain ===
In the early 19th century, Spain was weakened due to the Napoleonic Wars and the Spanish American Wars of Independence it had to fight in South America against Simón Bolívar and José de San Martín. Eventually, Spain felt that in its weakened state it might lose its North American territories to Britain. As a result of this, Spain decided to transfer its claims to parts of North America to its old ally United States during the American Revolutionary War through the Adams–Onís Treaty of 1819. In exchange, the U.S. promised to pay U.S. residents claims against the Spanish government totaling $5,000,000. Consequently, the United States of America has used its inherited Spanish rights to support its claims to the Oregon Country which consisted of the Oregon Territory and British Columbia during the Oregon boundary dispute with Britain.

== Population ==
The population of Canadians self-identified as of Spanish descent is 325,740, including those with multiple ethnic backgrounds. However, the laws in Spain limit the people who may be called Spaniard to those who can hold a European Union Spanish citizenship. For example, a Latin American would not be considered Spanish or a Spaniard in Spain until he can prove that his most recent parents or grandparents once held a Spanish passport or citizenship. The actual population that can legally be called Spaniard is probably only a fraction of the 325,730. This error originates with the actual Canadians who tend to blindly group all Latin Americans who speak the Spanish language as Spanish.

Spanish Canadians who hold Spanish citizenship from Spain are mostly concentrated in Edmonton, Winnipeg, Vancouver, Toronto, Montreal, Ottawa, London, and Mississauga.

Spaniards are found in all areas of the city of Montreal as well as in suburbs such as Dollard-des-Ormeaux, Laval, Brossard, and Greenfield Park. There is no "Spanish quartier", but Montreal's Rue Saint-Laurent is home to Spanish associations, which should not be confused with Latin American Associations, as well as to the Librería Española. They tend to congregate with other Southern Europeans such as Portuguese, Italians, and Greeks, as well as Latin Americans.

The Spanish population in Ontario and Quebec were relatively minor until after World War II and have not really had a profound impact in developing or promoting their language and culture, unlike the Hispanophone Latin American community. This in part is due to the fact that the Spanish population in Canada is much smaller in comparison to the Hispanophone Latin American population. As a rule of thumb, second generation Spanish Canadians seem to have become indifferent or have lost interest in having any ties to Spain and have easily been absorbed into the Anglophone or Francophone Canadian culture. Those Spanish Canadians who retained their language live along with and/or intermarried with Hispanophone Latin American Canadians; Spanish and French are Romance languages and share similarities in morphology and syntax.

The Spanish population in Nova Scotia has been growing in size and popularity in the last years. Atlantic Flamenco, a charitable organization to promote Flamenco in the Atlantic Provinces, is based in Halifax and was founded by Madrid born María Osende Flamenco and Ballet dancer and teacher. This organization hosts events regularly such as the “Halifax Feria de Abril” (Halifax April’s fair in English).

=== Demographics ===
Spanish Canadian population by Canadian province or territory (2016)
| Province | Population | Percentage | Source |
|---|---|---|---|
| Ontario | 171,145 | 1.3% | |
| Quebec | 85,360 | 1.1% | |
| British Columbia | 64,470 | 1.4% | |
| Alberta | 48,055 | 1.2% | |
| Manitoba | 12,620 | 1.0% | |
| Saskatchewan | 5,670 | 0.5% | |
| Nova Scotia | 4,295 | 0.5% | |
| New Brunswick | 2,550 | 0.4% | |
| Newfoundland and Labrador | 1,110 | 0.2% | |
| Prince Edward Island | 510 | 0.4% | |
| Northwest Territories | 315 | 0.8% | |
| Yukon | 270 | 0.8% | |
| Nunavut | 75 | 0.2% | |
| Canada | 396,460 | 1.2% | |

== See also ==
- European Canadians
- Spanish Americans
- Hispanic and Latino Americans
- Spanish Australians
- Spanish Brazilians
- Spanish Britons
- Spanish Filipinos
- Spanish New Zealanders
- Canada–Spain relations
